= Kensington Bushland Reserve =

Nature reserve in Perth, Western Australia

Coordinates: 31°59′16″S 115°53′13″E

Kensington Bushland

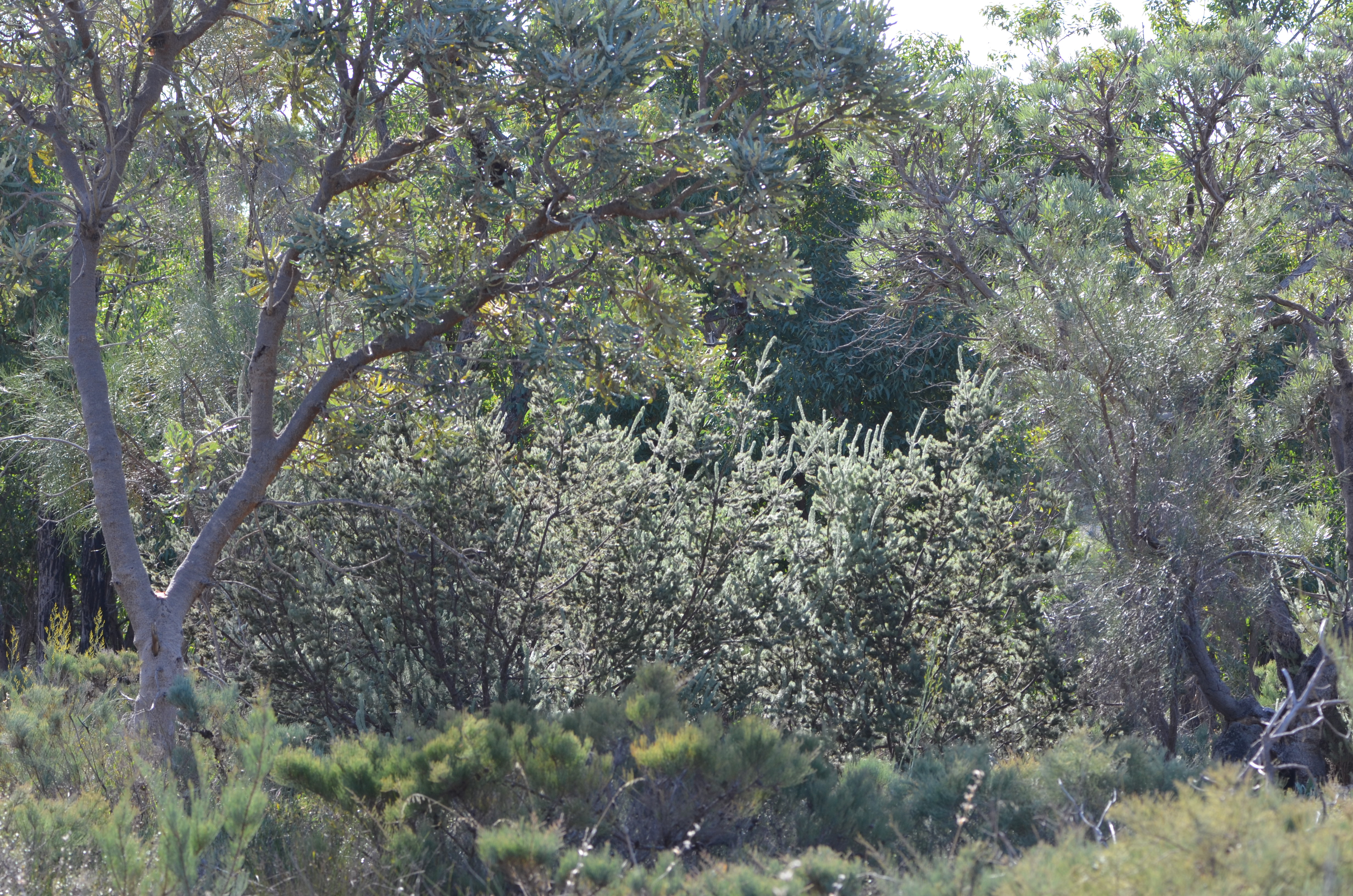
Kensington Bushland, Perth, Western Australia, with woolly bush and firewood banksias

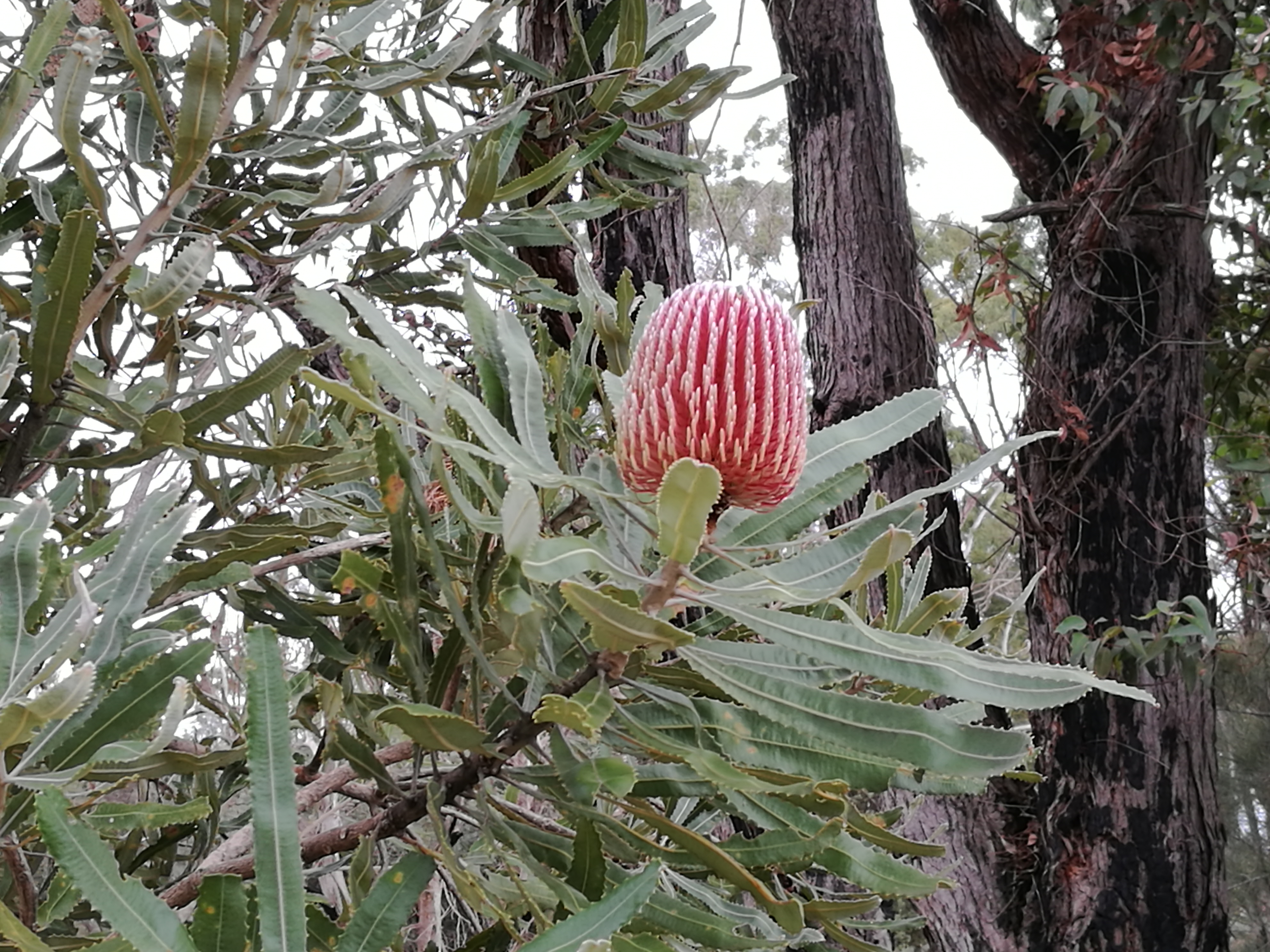
Banksia menziesii. Kensington Bushland, Kensington, Perth, Western Australia

Kensington bushland reserve is a significant remnant of Swan Coastal Plain vegetation, that has been reserved in the suburb of Kensington, in Perth, Western Australia, by the state government.

It is located west of Kent Street Senior High School, and lies on the north side of Kent Street. The portion of Jarrah Road that defined the western boundary of the reserve is a cul de sac, known as Baron Hay Court. Across the road is a Department of Agriculture complex. It is bounded to the north by Harold Rossiter Park, and George Reserve and has an area of 9.1 hectares (22 acres). It is close to the Western Australian Herbarium. In 2000 it was designated as "Bush Forever Site 48" by the Government of Western Australia.

It was made a reserve in the 1990s when the suburb was still located within Perth City council boundaries. It is now within the Town of Victoria Park local government area, and is managed together with "The Kent Street Sand Pit" and the "George Street Reserve" (a contaminated landfill site) as a single entity, the "Jirdarup Bushland Precinct". This Precinct has a total area of 17.9 hectares (44 acres). The name Jirdarup is a Nyoongar word meaning 'place of birds'. The Town of Victoria Park plans to rehabilitate the Sandpit site.

== Description ==
It lies on the Bassendean Dune system, the oldest and most easterly of the sand dune systems of the Swan Coastal Plain.

=== Flora ===
Key upper storey plant species within the bushland are Banksia menziesii, Banksia attenuata and jarrah (Eucalyptus marginata). As of 2003, some 207 plant species have been found, representing 42 families and 111 genera. Major weeds are Asparagus asparagoides, perennial veldt grass, Gladiolus caryophyllaceus, while Ehrharta longiflora, Ursinia anthemoides, and Misopates orontium are also threatening also to become a problem.

This bushland is part of the threatened ecological community, Banksia woodlands of the Swan Coastal Plain, the main threats to which are: fragmentation, dieback, weed invasion, inappropriate fire regimes and climate change. In February 2016, a bushfire burned approximately 70% of the native vegetation of the reserve.

List of native flora found in Kensington Bushland

1. Acacia huegelii
2. Acacia pulchella Prickly Moses
3. Acacia rostellifera Summer-scented Wattle
4. Acacia saligna Orange Wattle
5. Acacia sphacelata
6. Acacia stenoptera Narrow-winged Wattle
7. Acacia willdenowiana Grass Wattle
8. Adenanthos cygnorum Common Woollybush
9. Alexgeorgea nitens
10. Allocasuarina fraseriana Sheoak
11. Allocasuarina humilis Dwarf Sheoak
12. Amphipogon amphipogonoides-
13. Amphipogon turbinatus
14. Anigozanthos humilis Catspaw
15. Anigozanthos manglesii Mangles Kangaroo Paw
16. Arnocrinum preissii
17. Astroloma macrocalyx Swan Berry
18. Astroloma pallidum Kick Bush
19. Austrostipa compressa
20. Austrostipa elegantissima
21. Austrostipa flavescens
22. Austrostipa hemipogon
23. Austrostipa mollis
24. Banksia attenuata Slender Banksia
25. Banksia ilicifolia Holly-leafed Banksia
26. Banksia menziesii Firewood Banksia
27. Billardiera fraseri Elegant Pronaya
28. Billardiera fusiformis Australian Bluebell
29. Billardiera heterophylla Gumug
30. Bossiaea eriocarpa Common Brown Pea
31. Brachyscome bellidioides
32. Burchardia congesta Kara
33. Caladenia discoidea Dancing Orchid
34. Caladenia ferruginea Rusty Spider Orchid
35. Caladenia filifera Blood Spider Orchid
36. Caladenia flava Cowslip Orchid
37. Caladenia latifolia Pink Fairy Orchid
38. Caladenia longicauda Common White Spider Orchid
39. Caladenia longiclavata Clubbed Spider Orchid
40. Caladenia macrostylis Leaping Spider Orchid
41. Calandrinia corrigioloides Strap Purslane
42. Calandrinia granulifera Pygmy Purslane
43. Calectasia narragara
44. Calothamnus sanguineus Silky-leaved Blood Flower
45. Calytrix angulata Yellow Starflower
46. Calytrix flavescens Summer Starflower
47. Calytrix fraseri Pink Summer Calytrix
48. Cassytha racemosa Dodder Laurel
49. Chamaescilla corymbosa Blue Squill
50. Comesperma calymega Blue-spike Milkwort
51. Conostephium pendulum Pearl Flower
52. Conostephium preissii
53. Conostylis aculeata Prickly Conostylis
54. Conostylis aculeata subsp. aculeata
55. Conostylis aurea Golden Conostylis
56. Conostylis juncea
57. Conostylis setigera Bristly Cottonhead
58. Corynotheca micrantha Sand Lily
59. Crassula colorata Dense Stonecrop
60. Cyanicula sericea
61. Dampiera linearis Common Dampiera
62. Dasypogon bromeliifolius Pineapple Bush
63. Daviesia divaricata Marno
64. Daviesia nudiflora
65. Daviesia triflora
66. Desmocladus flexuosus
67. Dianella revoluta Blueberry Lily
68. Dianella revoluta var. divaricata
69. Dianella revoluta var. revoluta
70. Diuris brumalis
71. Diuris magnifica
72. Drosera erythrorhiza Red Ink Sundew
73. Drosera huegelii Bold Sundew
74. Drosera macrantha Bridal Rainbow
75. Drosera menziesii Pink Rainbow
76. Drosera menziesii subsp. penicillaris
77. Drosera pallida Pale Rainbow
78. Drosera stolonifera Leafy Sundew
79. Eremaea pauciflora
80. Eremaea pauciflora var pauciflora
81. Eriochilus dilatatus subsp. dilatatus
82. Eucalyptus marginata Jarrah
83. Eucalyptus todtiana Coastal Blackbutt
84. Gastrolobium capitatum
85. Gompholobium tomentosum Hairy Yellow Pea
86. Haemodorum spicatum Mardja
87. Hardenbergia comptoniana Native Wisteria
88. Hemiandra pungens Snakebush
89. Hibbertia huegelii
90. Hibbertia hypericoides Yellow Buttercups
91. Hibbertia racemosa Stalked Guinea Flower
92. Hibbertia subvaginata
93. Hovea trisperma Common Hovea
94. Hyalosperma cotula
95. Hybanthus calycinus Wild Violet
96. Hypocalymma robustum Swan River Myrtle
97. Hypolaena exsulca
98. Isotropis cuneifolia Granny Bonnets
99. Jacksonia furcellata Grey Stinkwood
100. Jacksonia lehmannii
101. Jacksonia sternbergiana Stinkwood
102. Johnsonia pubescens Pipe Lily
103. Kennedia prostrata Scarlet Runner
104. Lagenophora huegelii
105. Laxmannia squarrosa
106. Lepidobolus preissianus
107. Lepidosperma angustatum
108. Lepidosperma squamatum
109. Leptomeria cunninghamii
110. Leptomeria empetriformis
111. Leptospermum spinescens
112. Leucopogon conostephioides
113. Leucopogon parviflorus Coast Beard-heath
114. Leucopogon propinquus
115. Levenhookia stipitata Common Stylewort
116. Lobelia tenuior Slender Lobelia
117. Lomandra caespitosa Tufted Mat Rush
118. Lomandra hermaphrodita
119. Lomandra nigricans
120. Lomandra odora Tiered Mat Rush
121. Lomandra preissii
122. Lomandra suaveolens
123. Lyginia barbata
124. Lysinema ciliatum Curry Flower
125. Macarthuria australis
126. Macrozamia riedlei Zamia
127. Melaleuca seriata
128. Mesomelaena pseudostygia Semophore Sedge
129. Mesomelaena stygia
130. Microtis media Tall Mignonette Orchid
131. Monotaxis grandiflora Diamond of the Desert
132. Neurachne alopecuroidea Foxtail Mulga Grass
133. Nuytsia floribunda Christmas Tree
134. Olearia paucidentata Autumn Scrub Daisy
135. Patersonia occidentalis Purple Flag
136. Persoonia saccata Snottygobble
137. Petrophile linearis Pixie Mop
138. Petrophile macrostachya
139. Pheladenia deformis Blue Fairy Orchid
140. Philotheca spicata Pepper and Salt
141. Phlebocarya ciliata
142. Pimelea suaveolens Scented Banjine
143. Pimelea sulphurea Yellow Banjine
144. Podolepis gracilis Slender gracilis
145. Podotheca angustifolia Sticky Longheads
146. Podotheca chrysantha Yellow Podotheca
147. Podotheca gnaphalioides Golden Long-heads
148. Poranthera microphylla Small Poranthera
149. Pterostylis dilatata
150. Pterostylis pyramidalis Snail Orchid
151. Pterostylis recurva Jug Orchid
152. Pterostylis sanguinea
153. Pterostylis vittata Banded Greenhood
154. Regelia inops
155. Rytidosperma caespitosum
156. Scaevola canescens Grey Scaevola
157. Scaevola repens
158. Schoenus brevisetis
159. Schoenus curvifolius
160. Schoenus lanatus Woolly Bog-rush
161. Schoenus latitans
162. Scholtzia involucrata Spiked Scholtzia
163. Siloxerus humifusus Procumbent Siloxerus
164. Sowerbaea laxiflora Purple Tassels
165. Stachystemon vermicularis
166. Stackhousia monogyna
167. Stirlingia latifolia Blueboy
168. Stylidium amoenum Lovely Triggerplant
169. Stylidium androsaceum
170. Stylidium brunonianum Pink Fountain Triggerplant
171. Stylidium calcaratum Book Triggerplant
172. Stylidium carnosum Fleshy-leaved Triggerplant
173. Stylidium diuroides Donkey Triggerplant
174. Stylidium junceum Reed Triggerplant
175. Stylidium neurophyllum Coastal Plain Triggerplant
176. Stylidium piliferum Common Butterfly Triggerplant
177. Stylidium repens Matted Triggerplant
178. Stylidium schoenoides Cow Kicks
179. Styphelia tenuiflora Common Pinheath
180. Synaphea spinulosa
181. Taxandria linearifolia
182. Thelymitra graminea Shy Sun Orchid
183. Thelymitra macrophylla Scented Sun Orchid
184. Thysanotus manglesianus Fringed Lily
185. Thysanotus sparteus
186. Thysanotus tenellus
187. Thysanotus triandrus
188. Trachymene pilosa Native Parsnip
189. Tricoryne elatior Yellow Autumn Lily
190. Tripterococcus brunonis Winged Stackhousia
191. Verticordia densiflora Compacted Featherflower
192. Wahlenbergia gracilenta Annual Bluebell
193. Waitzia suaveolens Fragrant Waitzia
194. Xanthorrhoea brunonis
195. Xanthorrhoea preissii Balga, Grass Tree
196. Xanthosia huegelii

List of Weeds found in Kensington Bushland

1. Asparagus asparagoides (Bridal Creeper)
2. Avena barbata (Bearded Oat)
3. Brassica tournefortii (Mediterranean Turnip)
4. Briza maxima (Blowfly Grass)
5. Bromus diandrus (Great Brome)
6. Chamelaucium uncinatum (Geraldton Wax)
7. Conyza bonariensis (Flaxleaf Fleabane)
8. Corymbia citriodora (Lemon-scented Gum)
9. Corymbia maculata (Spotted Gum)
10. Ehrharta calycina (Perennial Veldt Grass)
11. Ehrharta cf. longiflora/brevifolia? (Annual Veldt Grass)
12. Eragrostis curvula (African Lovegrass)
13. Eucalyptus camaldulensis (River Gum)
14. Euphorbia terracina (Geraldton Carnation Weed)
15. Euphorbia peplus (Petty Spurge)
16. Fumaria capreolata (Whiteflower Fumitory)
17. Fumaria muralis (Wall Fumitory)
18. Fumaria bastardii
19. Gladiolus caryophyllaceus (Wild Gladiolus)
20. Hordeum glaucum (Northern Barley Grass)
21. Lupinus sp. (Lupin)
22. Malva parviflora (Marshmallow)
23. Medicago sp. (Medic)
24. Misopates orantium (Lesser Snapdragon)
25. Oxalis pes-caprae (Soursob)
26. Pelargonium capitatum (Rose Pelargonium)
27. Raphanus raphanistrum (Wild Radish)
28. Romulea rosea (Guildford Grass)
29. Solanum nigrum (Black Berry Nightshade)
30. Sonchus asper (Rough Sowthistle)
31. Sonchus oleraceus (Common Sowthistle)
32. Ursinia anthemoides (Ursinia)

=== Fauna ===
Significant bird species which may be seen in the bushland are Carnaby's black cockatoo (Calyptorhynchus latirostris) - endangered, forest red-tailed black cockatoo (Calyptorhynchus banksii) - vulnerable, and the rainbow bee-eater (Merops ornatus), with forest red-tailed black cockatoo being year-round residents of the area. Pitfall trapping in 2017 found eight native reptiles. These included the western bobtail (Tiliqua rugosa), dugites (Pseudonaja affinis), the western bearded dragon (Pogona minor), and Buchanan's snake-eyed skink (Cryptoblepharus buchananii).

This tiny piece of remnant bushland has often been the subject of surveys. Thus, one of the first Australian records for the aphid, Uroleucon erigeronense is from Kensington Bushland. The day-flying moth, Pollanisus occidentalis, is found in abundance in the bushland. A new species of robber fly, Cerdistus hudsoni, has so far (as of 2011) only been found in two places, one of which is Kensington Bushland.

== Galleries ==
Native plants found and photographed in Kensington Bushland reserve
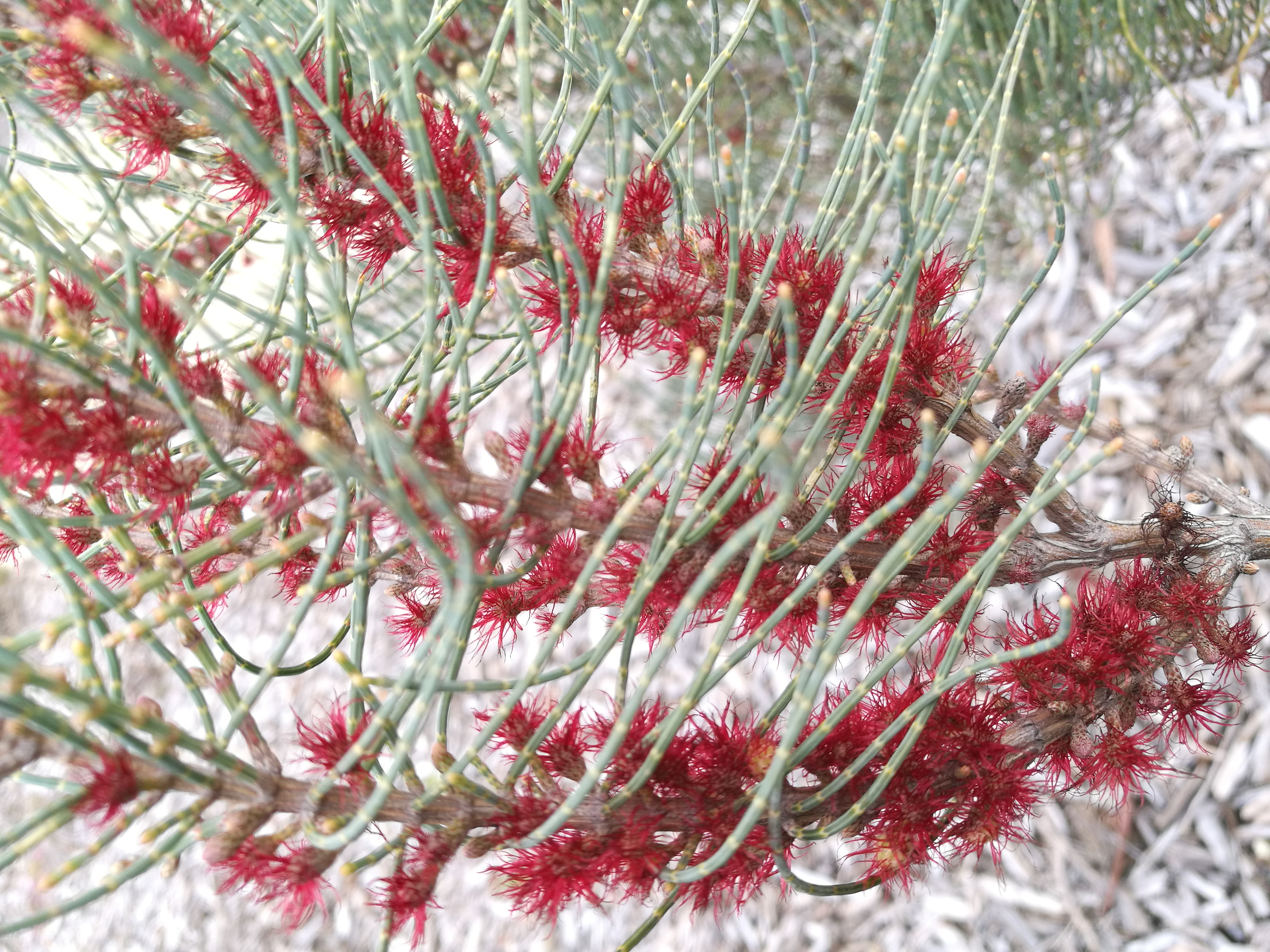
Allocasuarina humilis, 21 June 2018

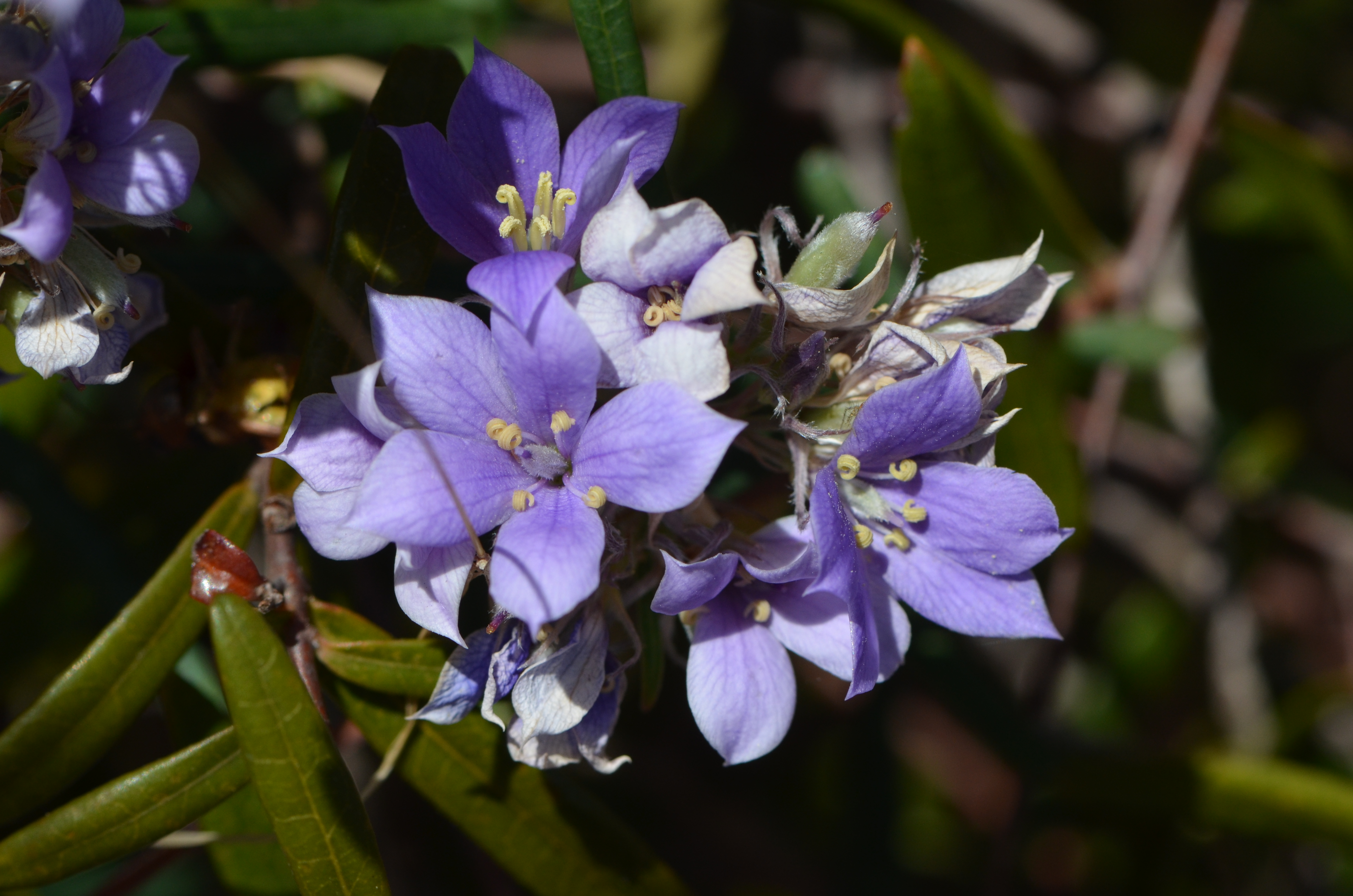
Billardiera fraseri, 19 January 2016

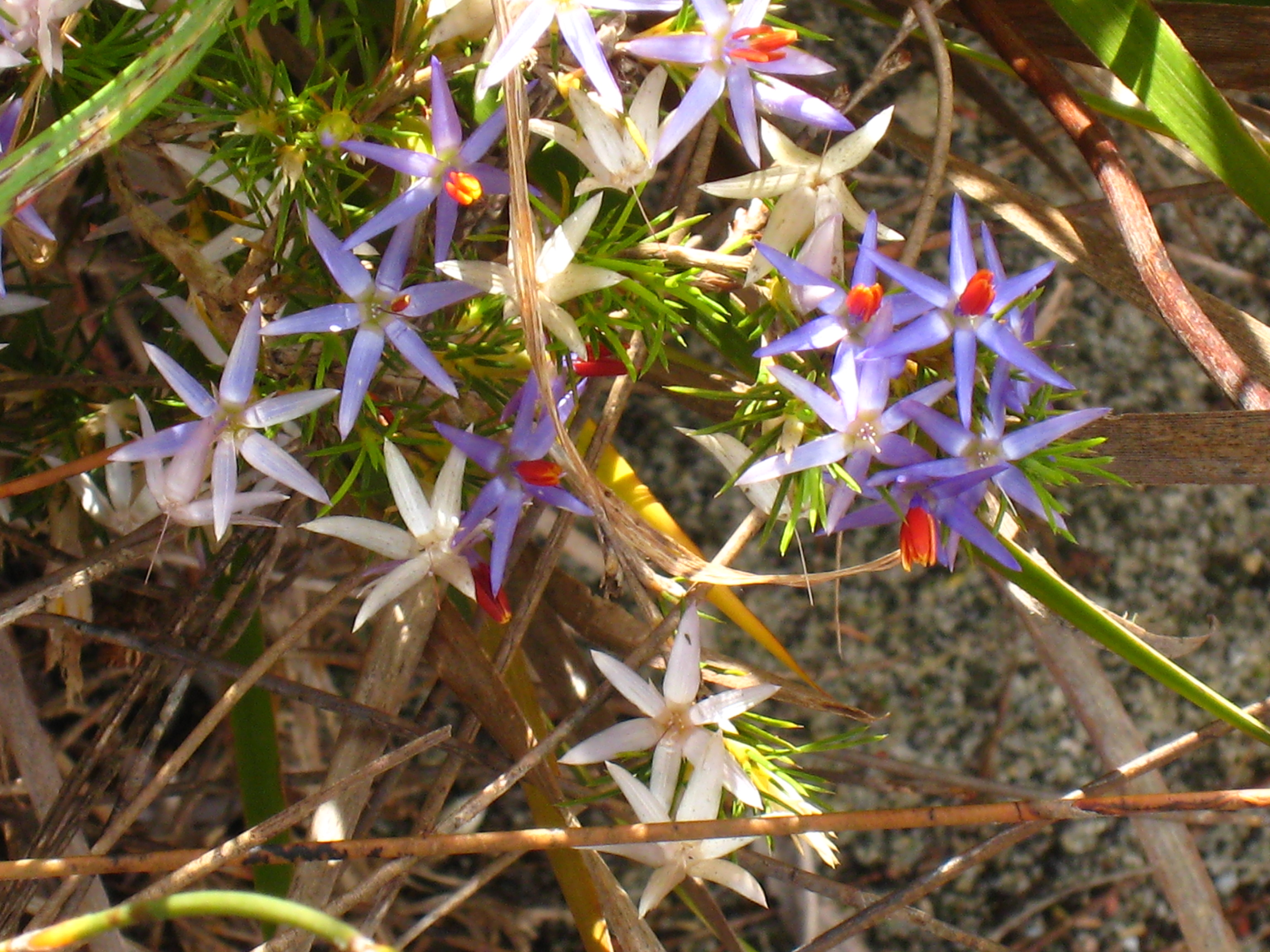
Calectasia, 8 October 2007

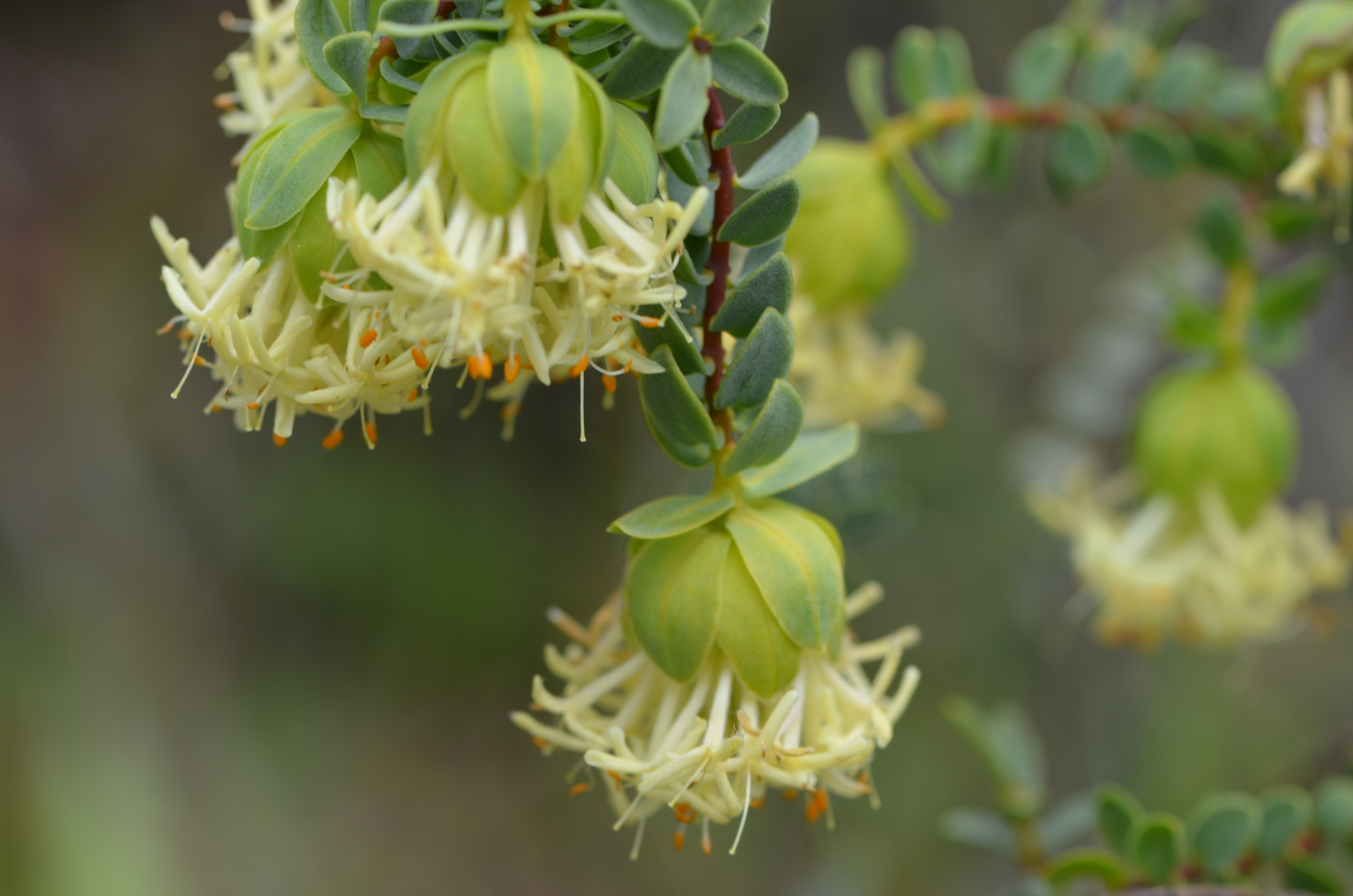
Pimelea sulphurea, 9 October 2016

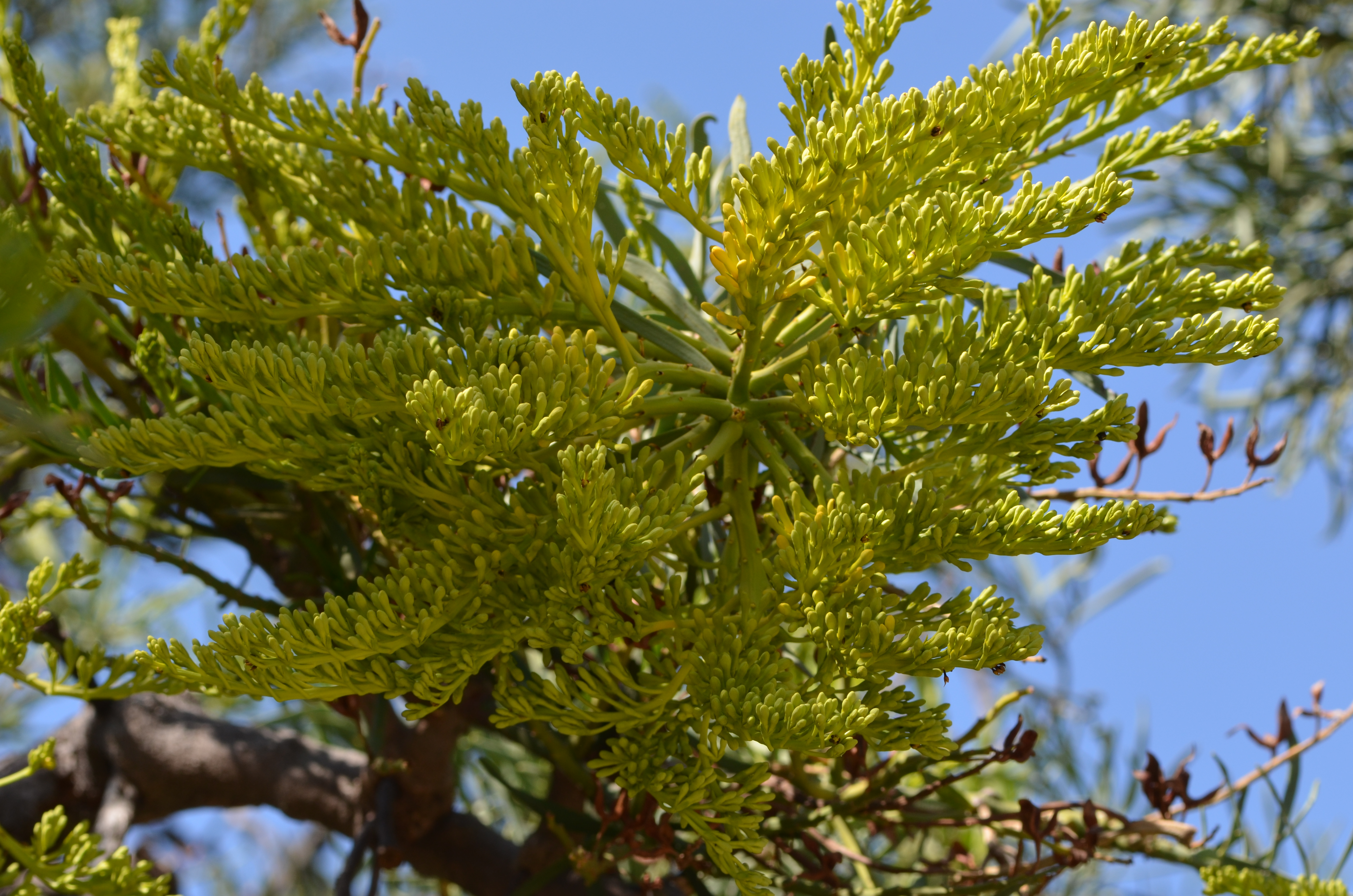
Nuytsia floribunda, 19 October 2015

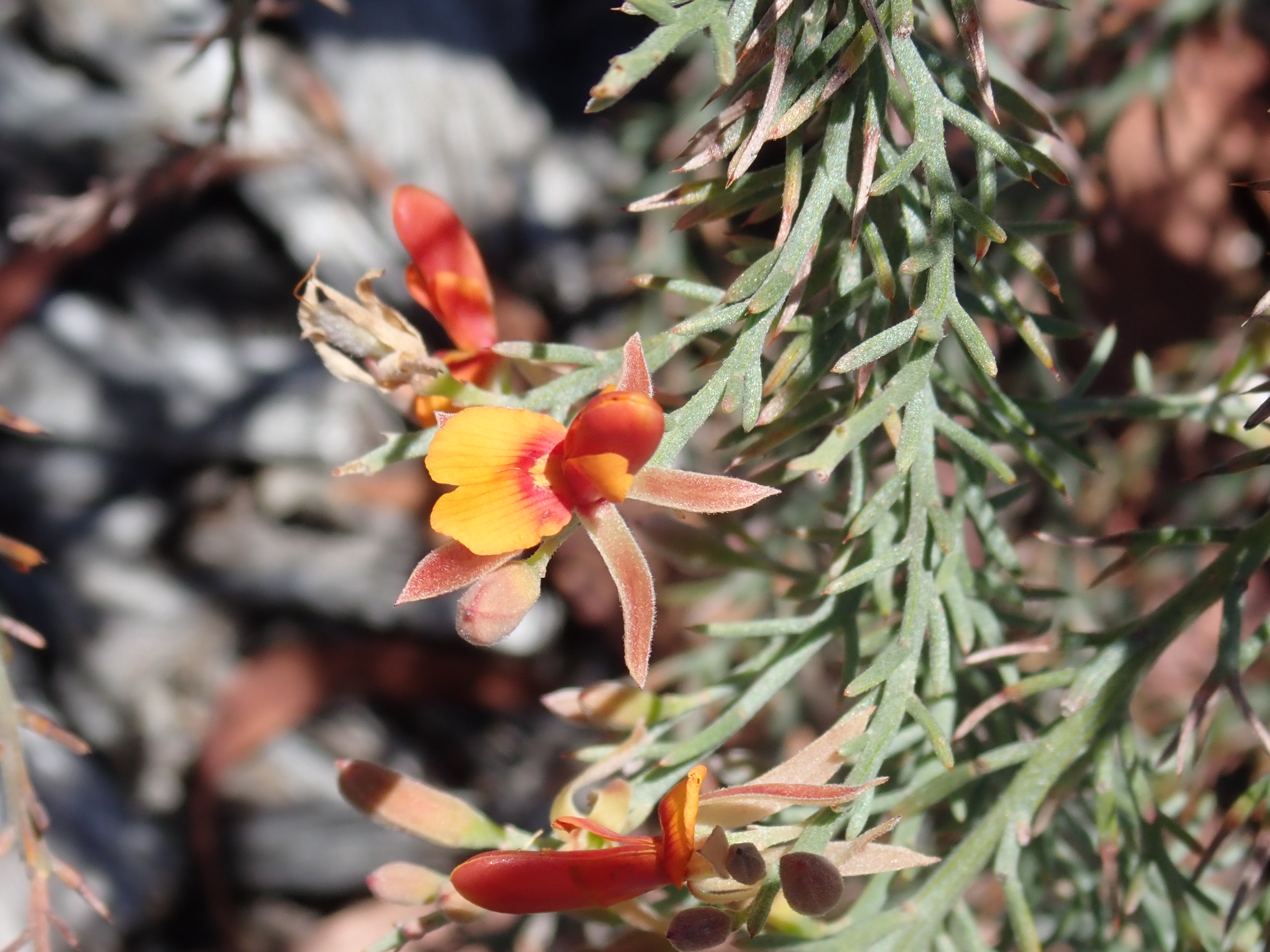
Jacksonia furcellata, 20 December 2017

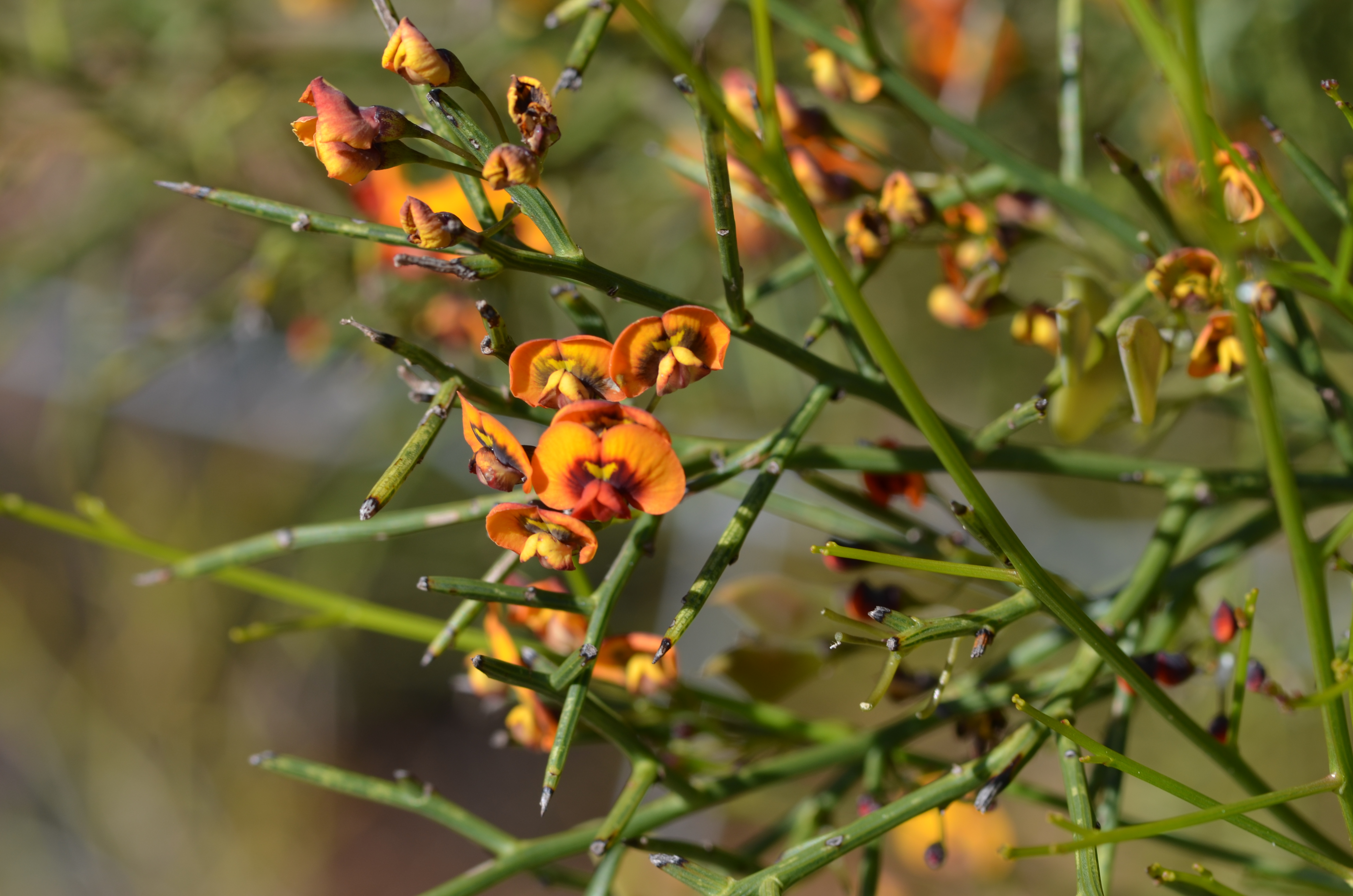
Daviesia divaricata, 13 October 2011

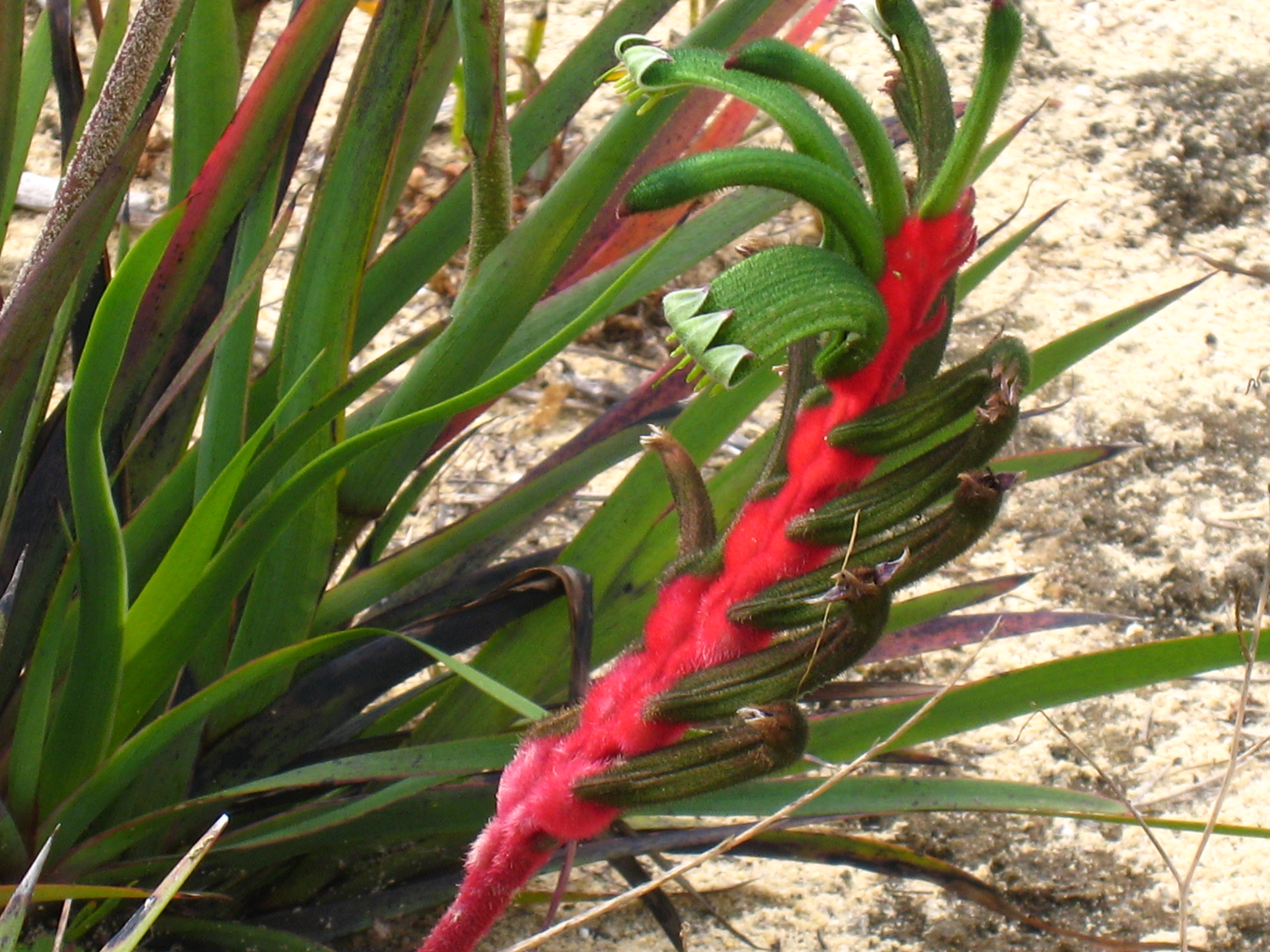
Anigozanthos manglesii, 9 October 2007

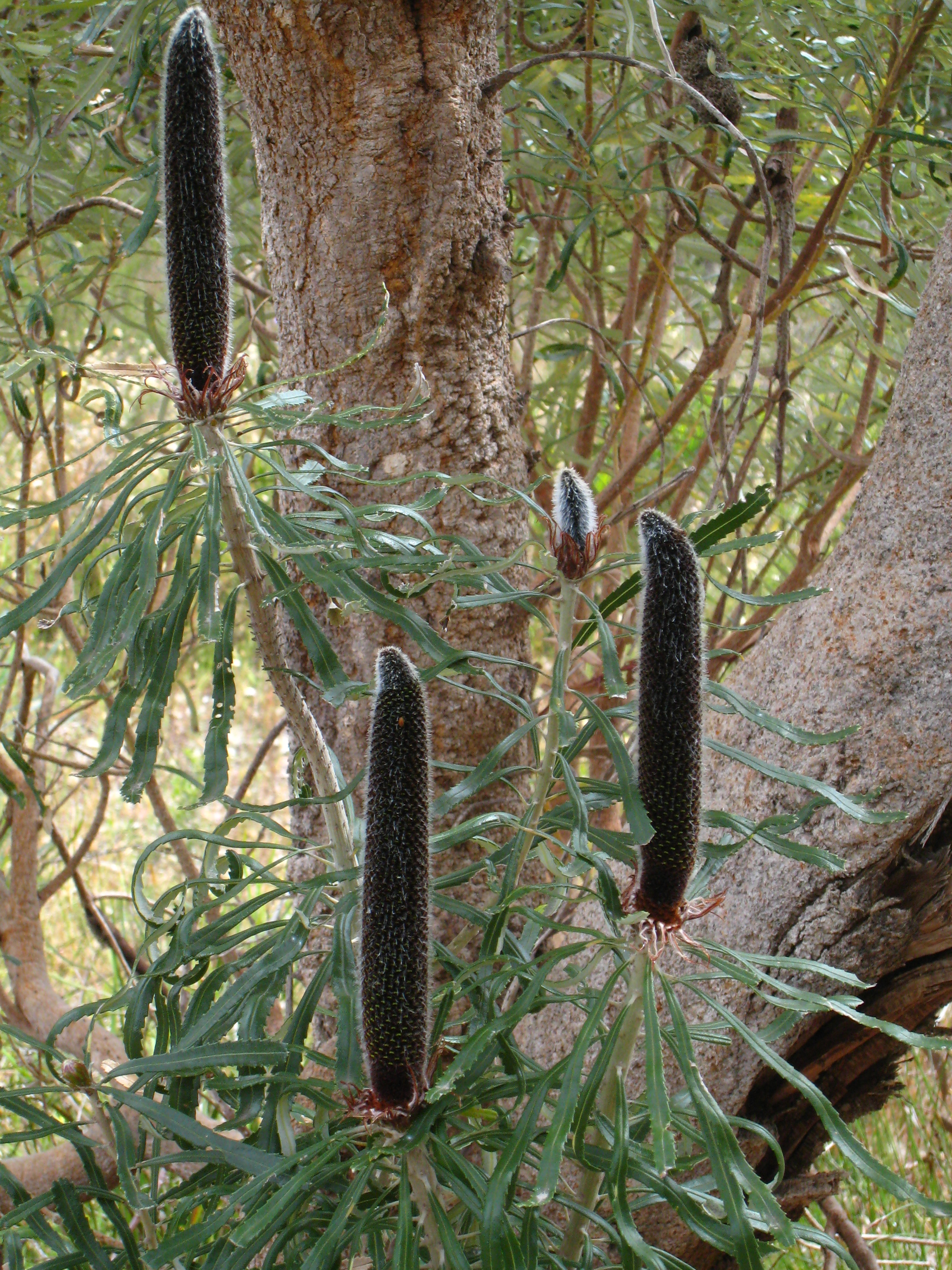
Banksia attenuata, 19 October 2007

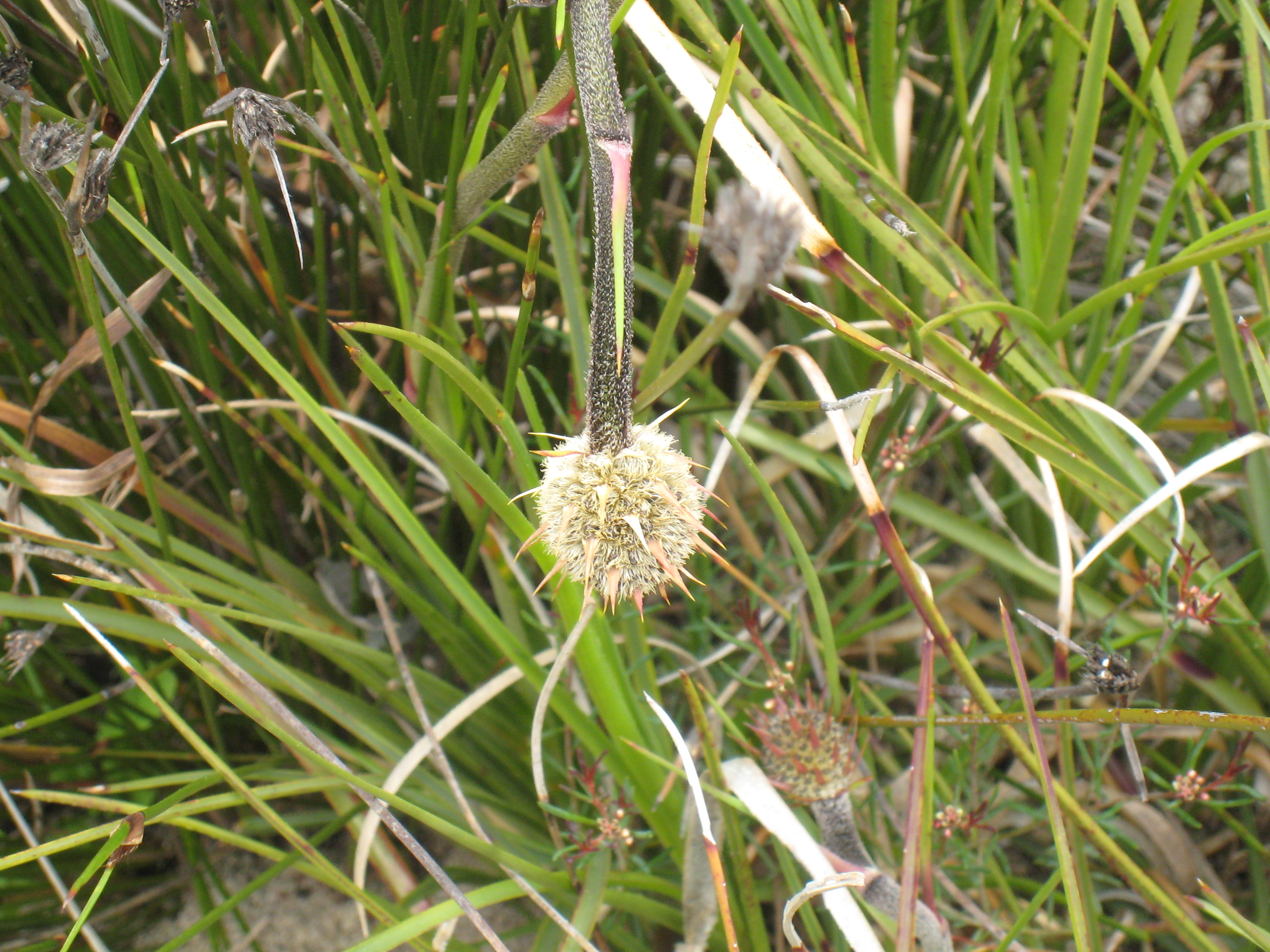
Dasypogon bromeliifolius, 9 October 2007

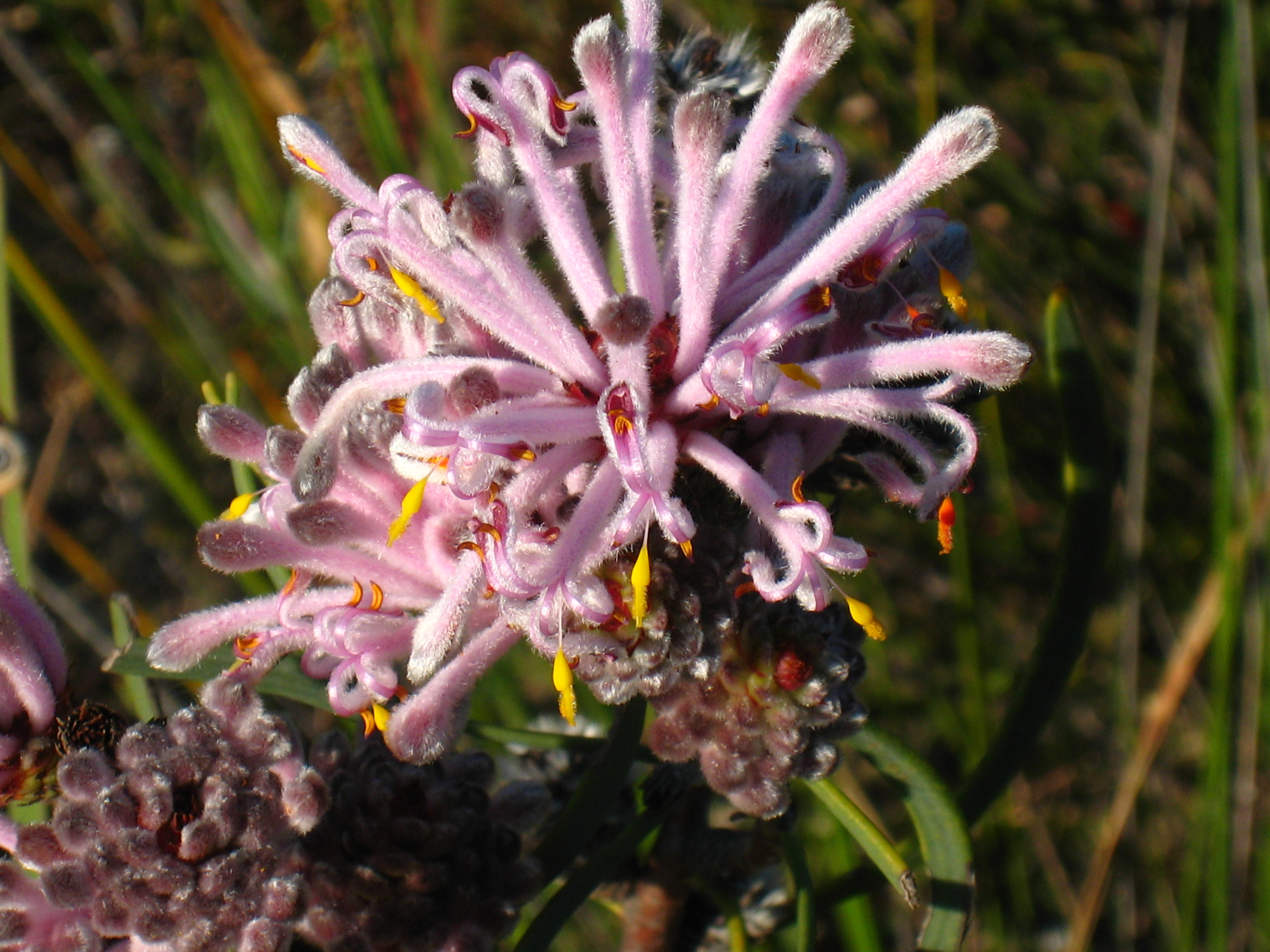
Petrophile linearis, 16 October 2007

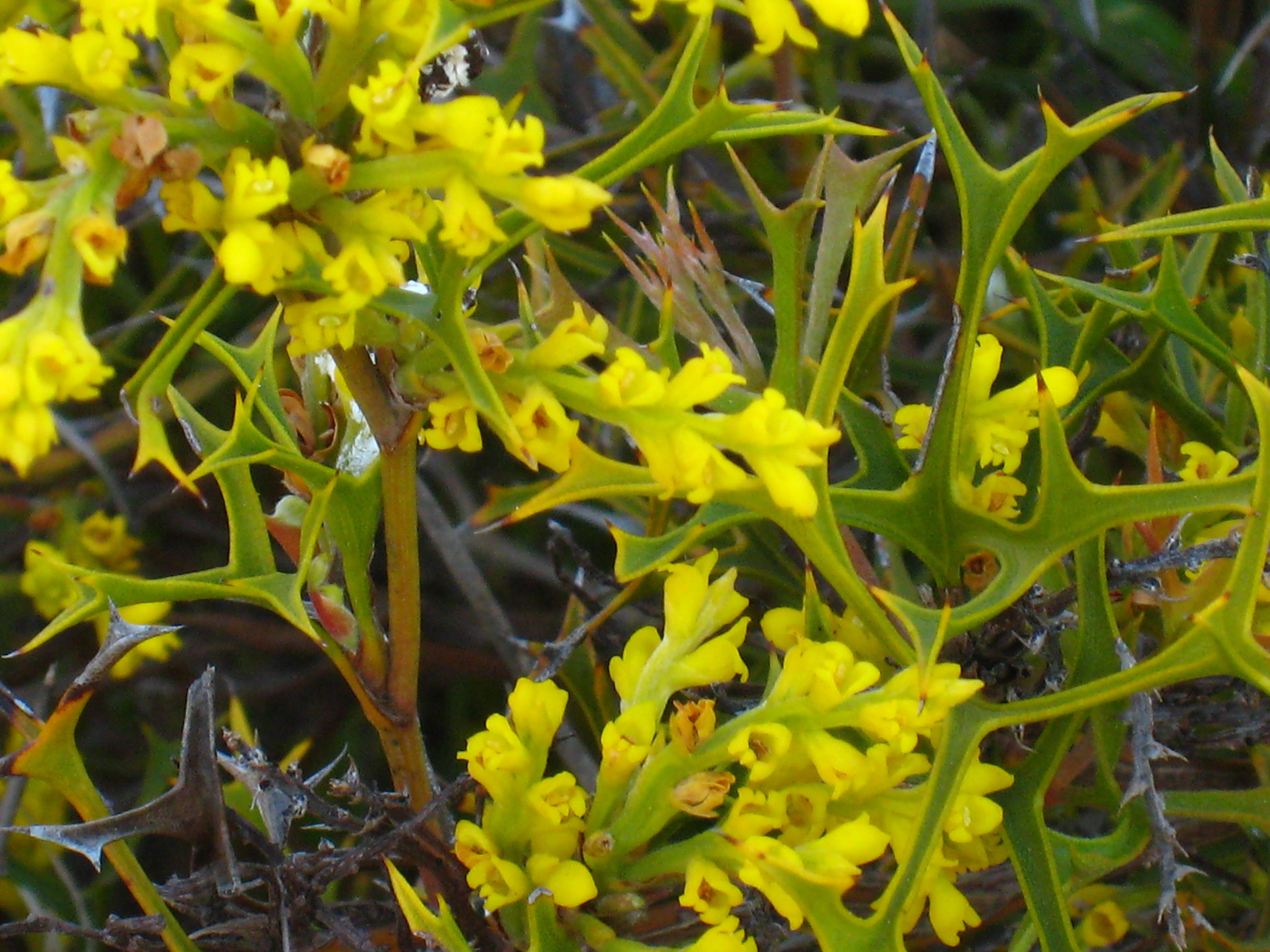
Synaphea spinulosa, 16 October 2007

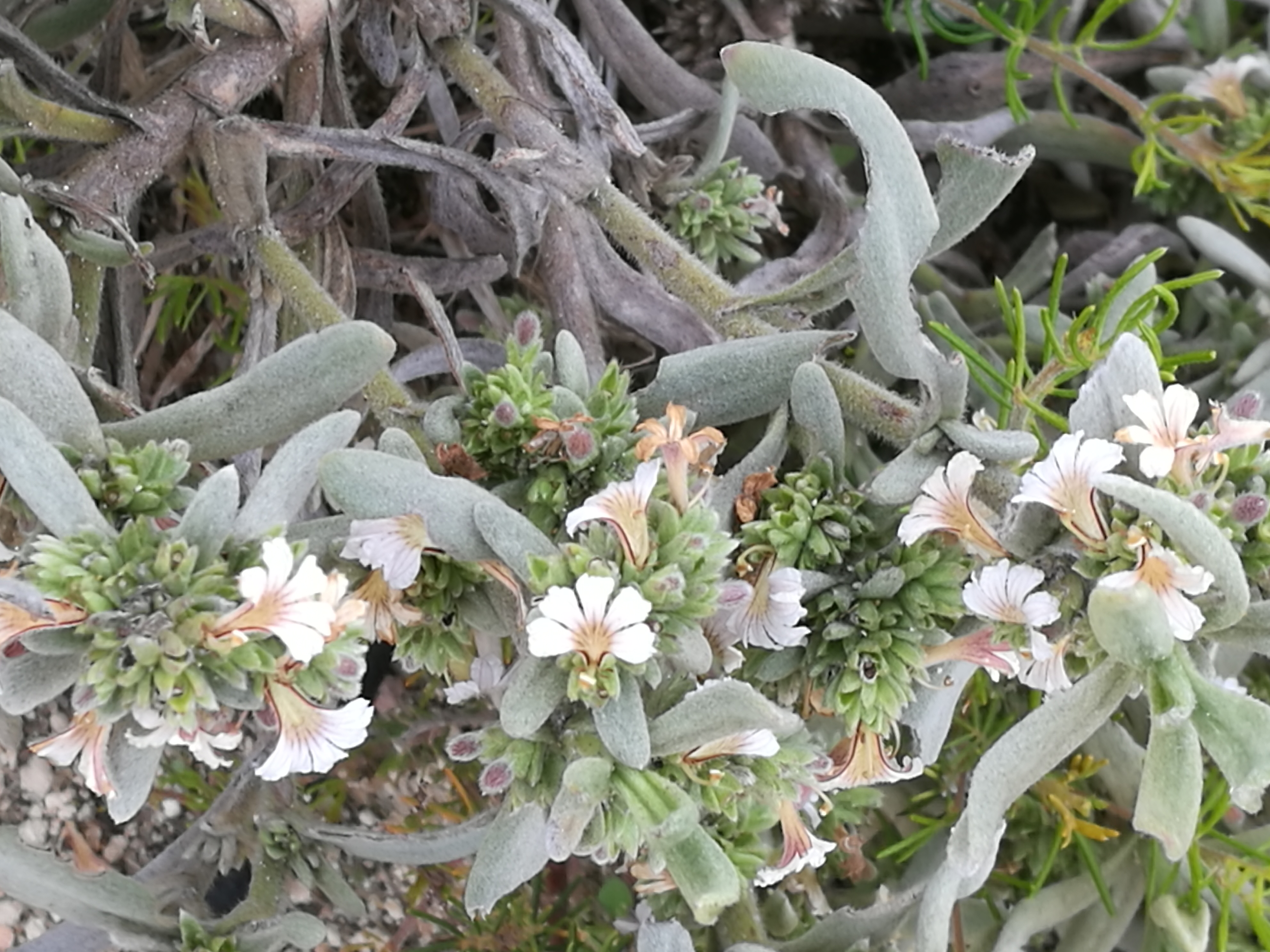
Scaevola canescens, 21 June 2018

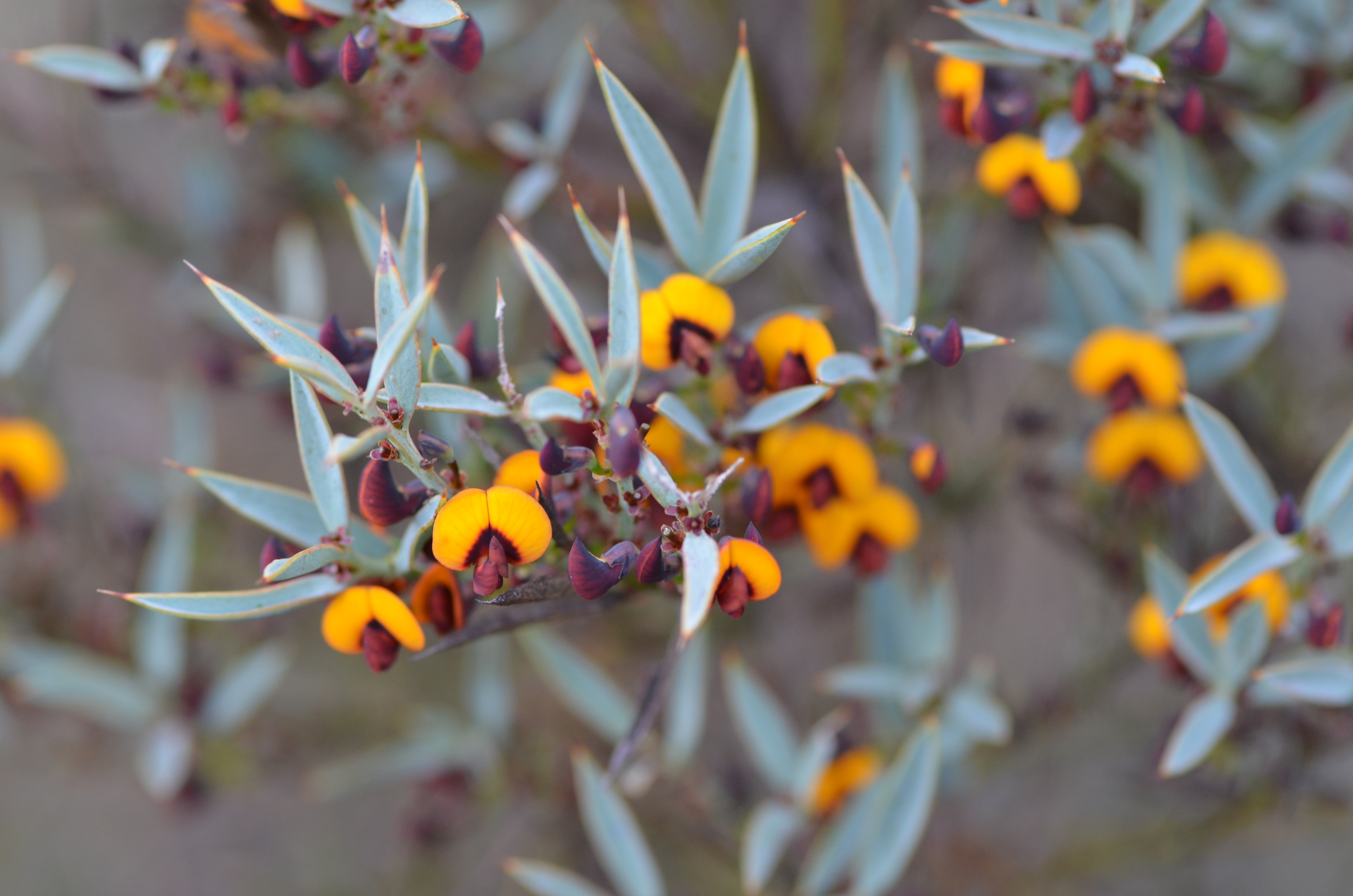
Daviesia nudiflora, 12 July 2014

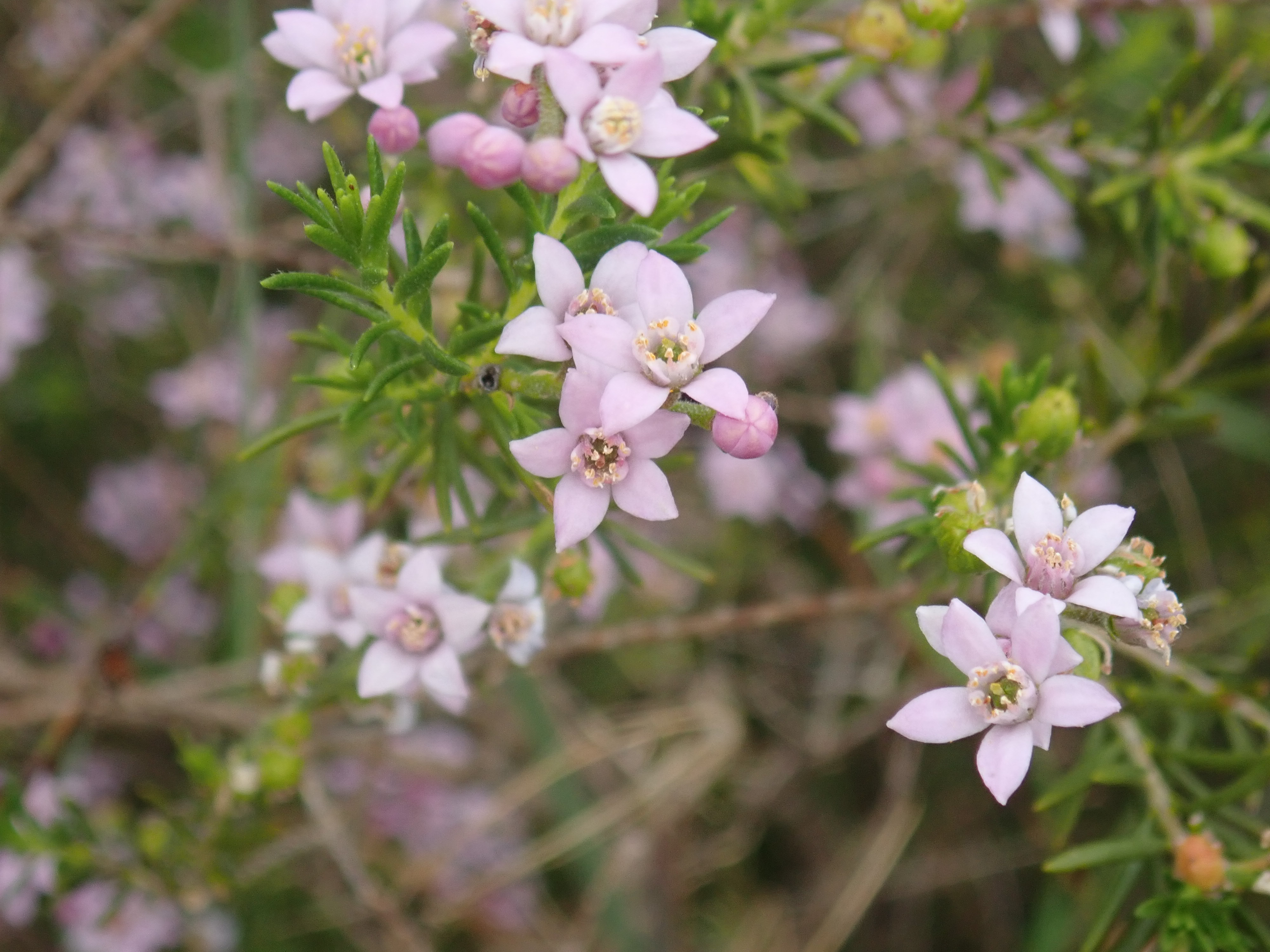
Philotheca spicata

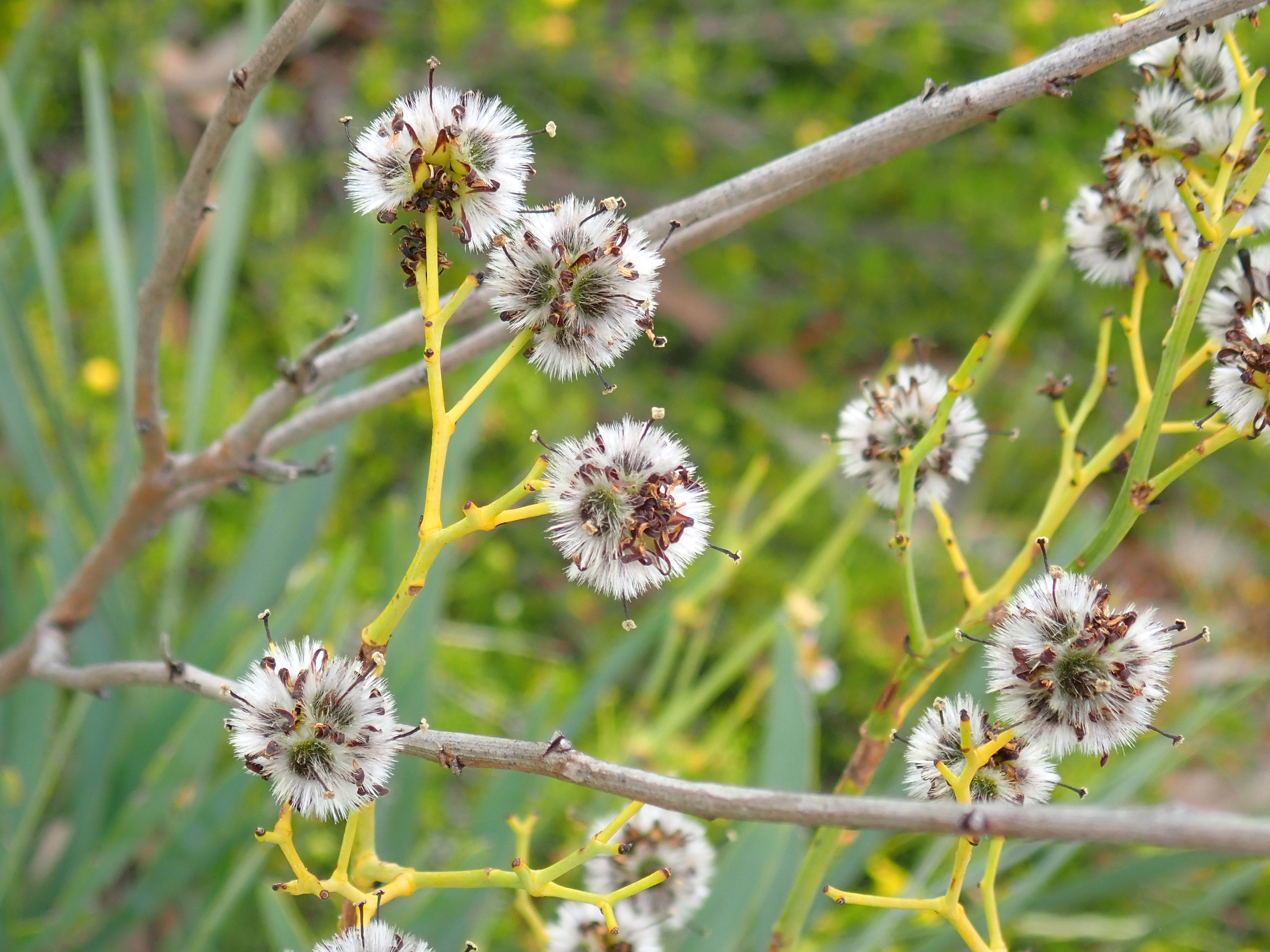
Stirlingia latifolia

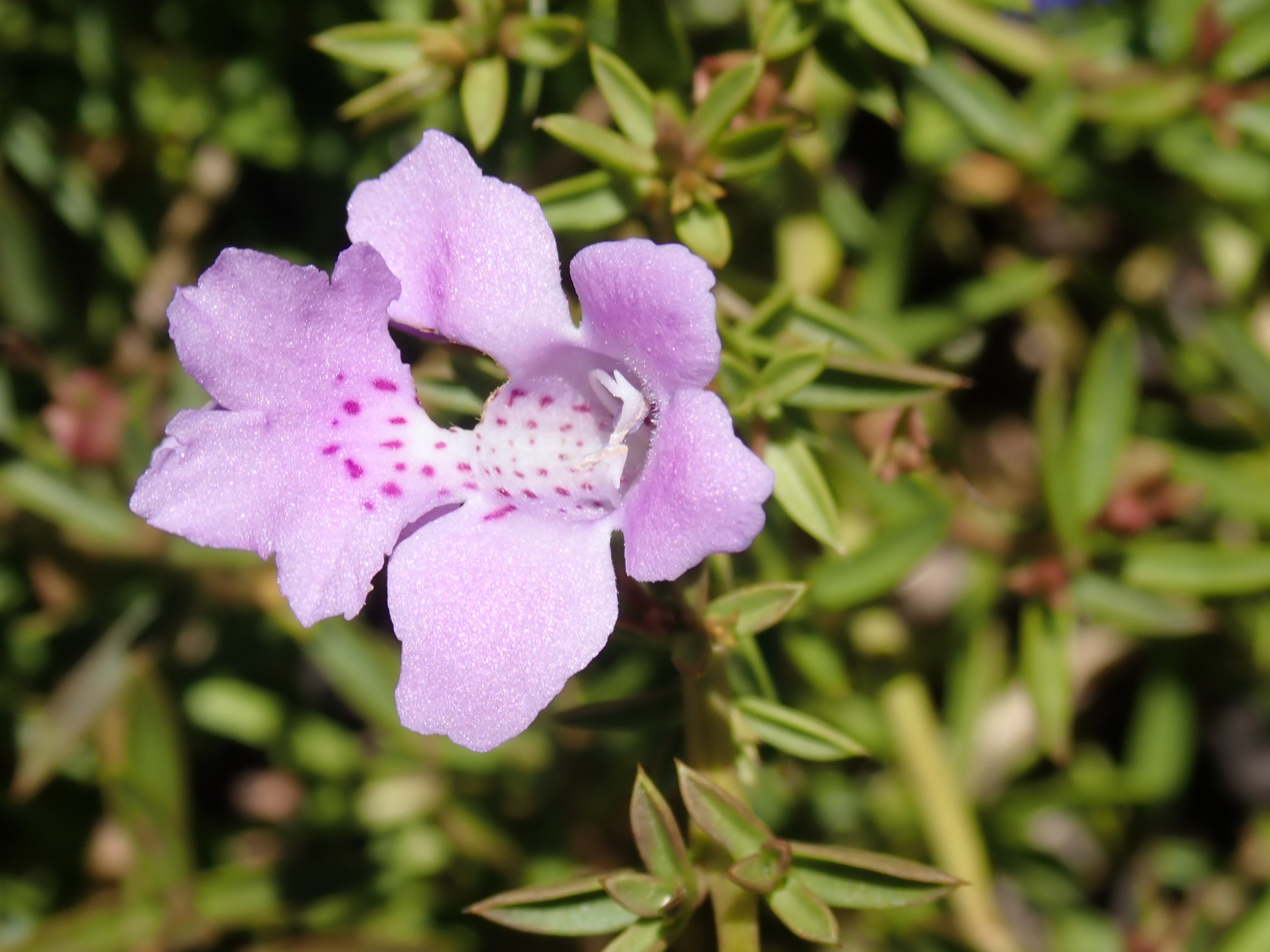
Hemiandra pungens

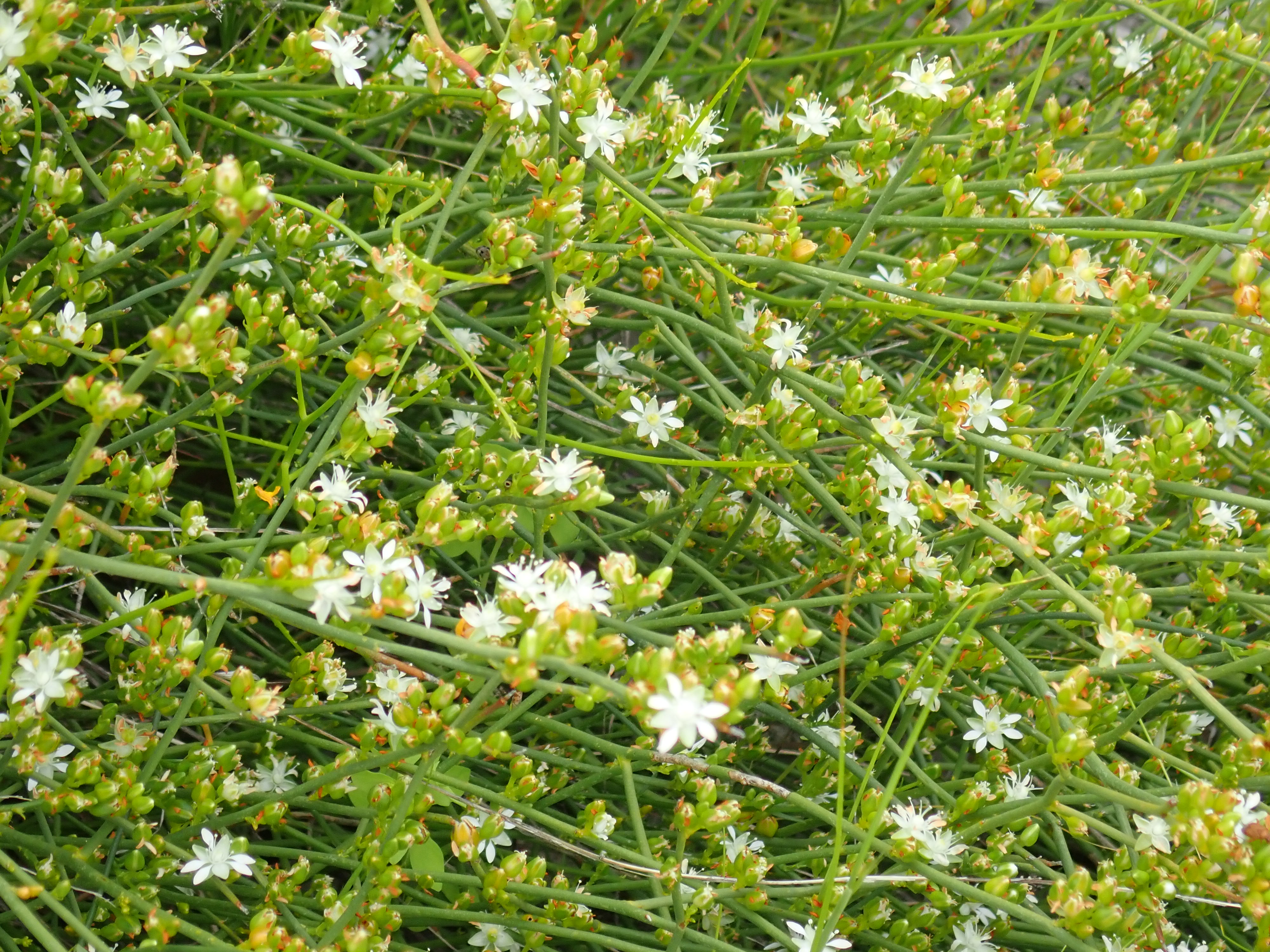
Macarthuria australis

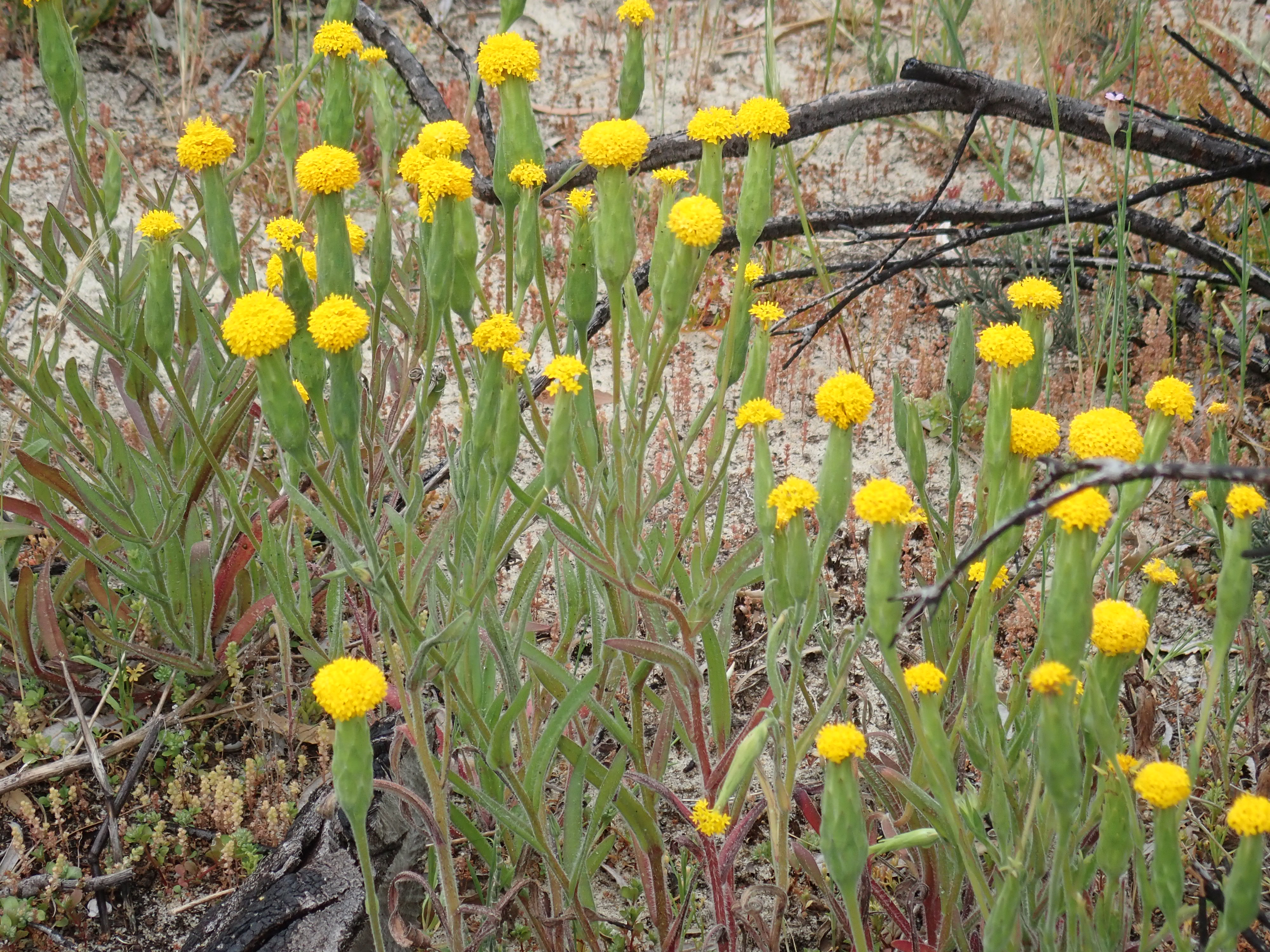
Podotheca gnaphalioides

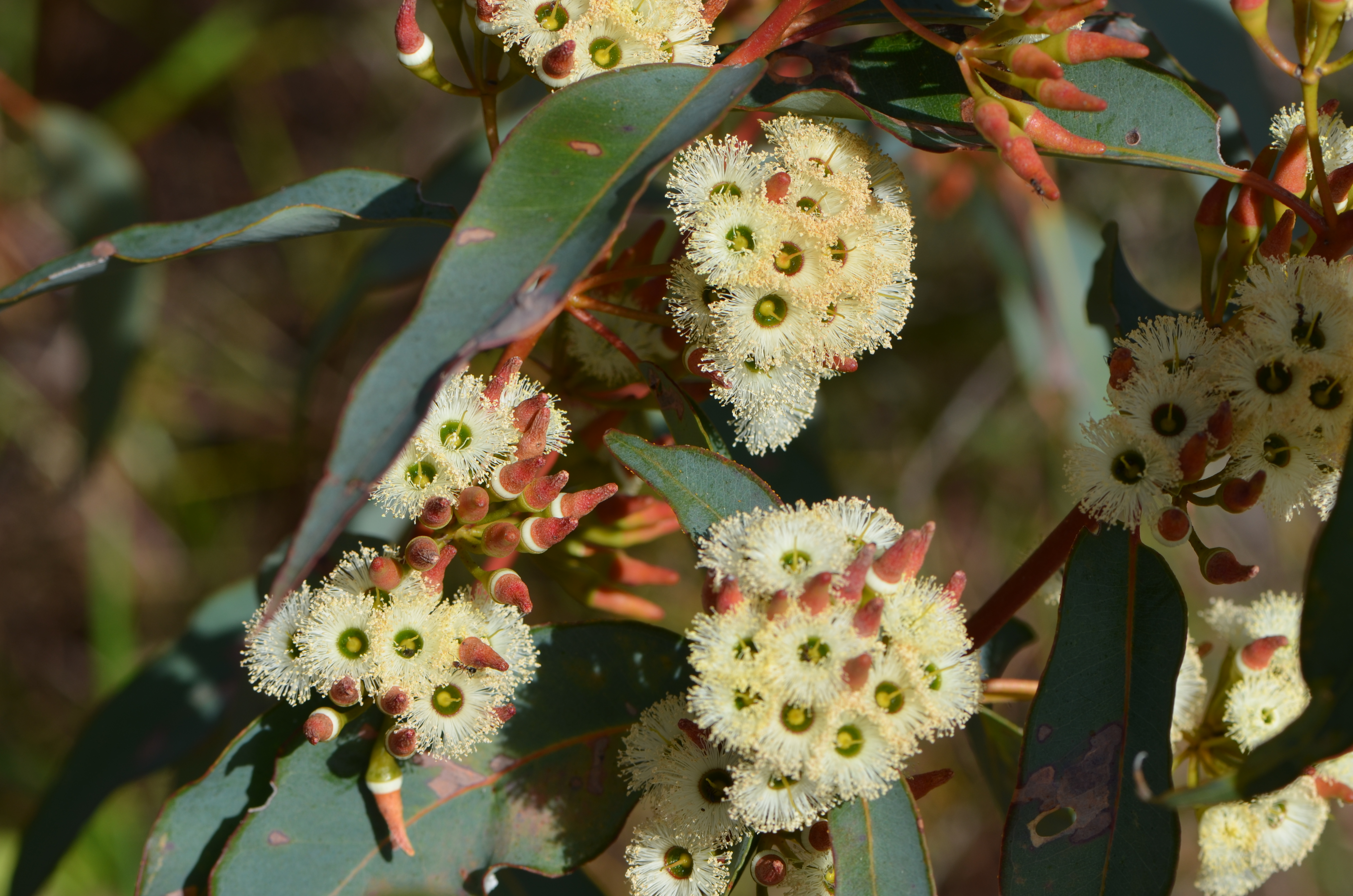
Eucalyptus marginata
Weeds found and photographed in Kensington Bushland reserve
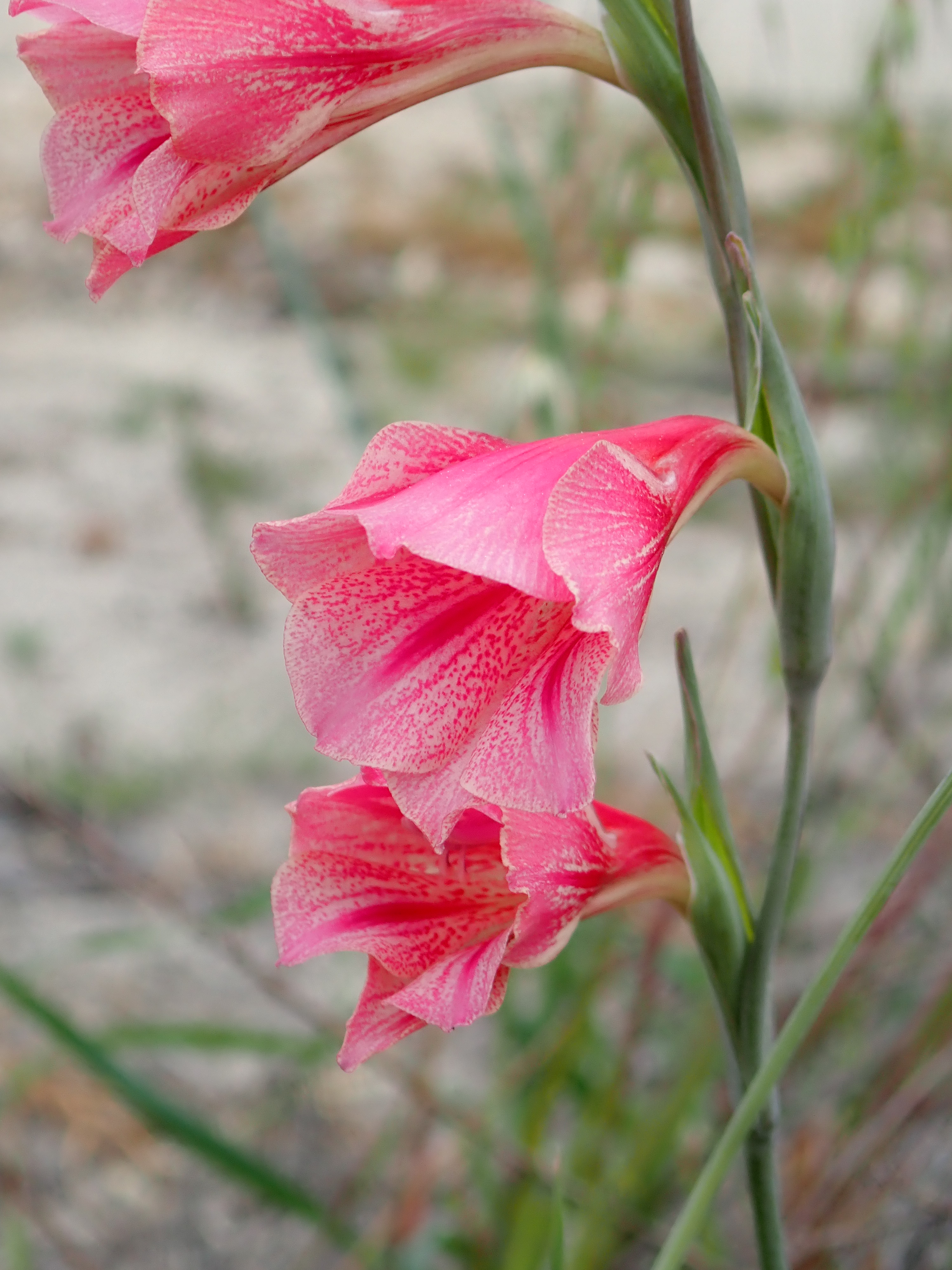
Gladiolus caryophyllaceus

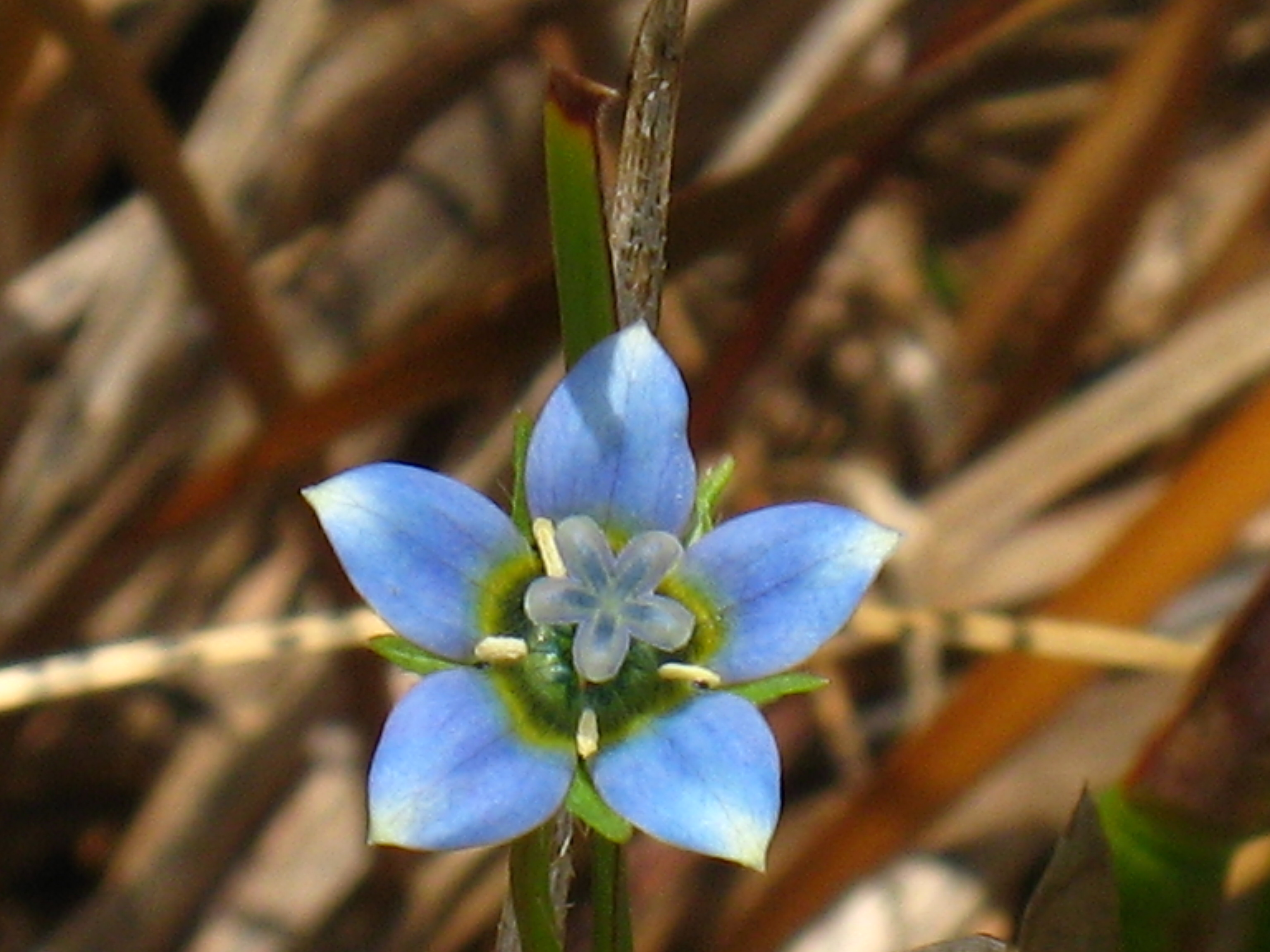
Wahlenbergia capensis

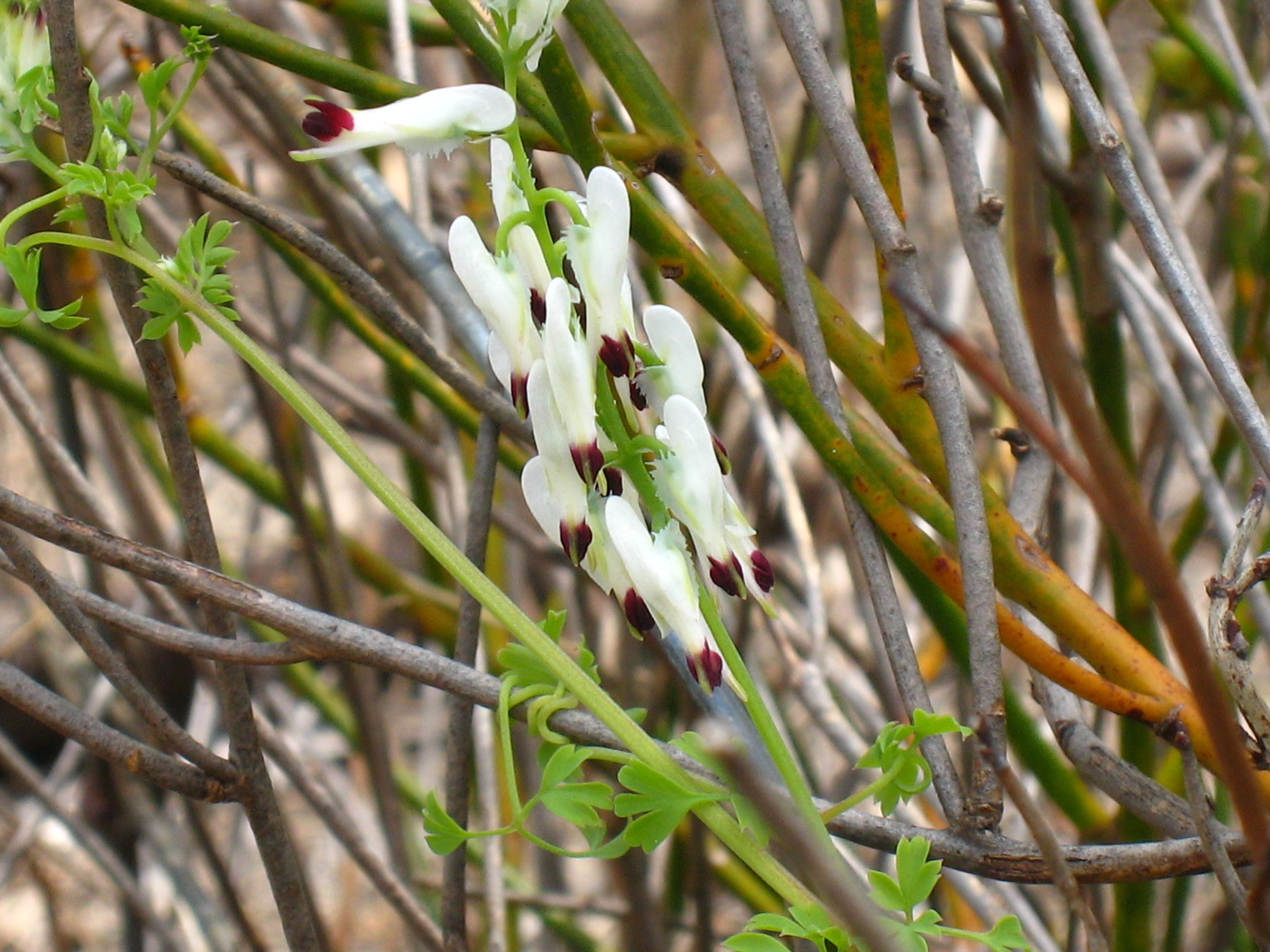
Fumaria capreolata

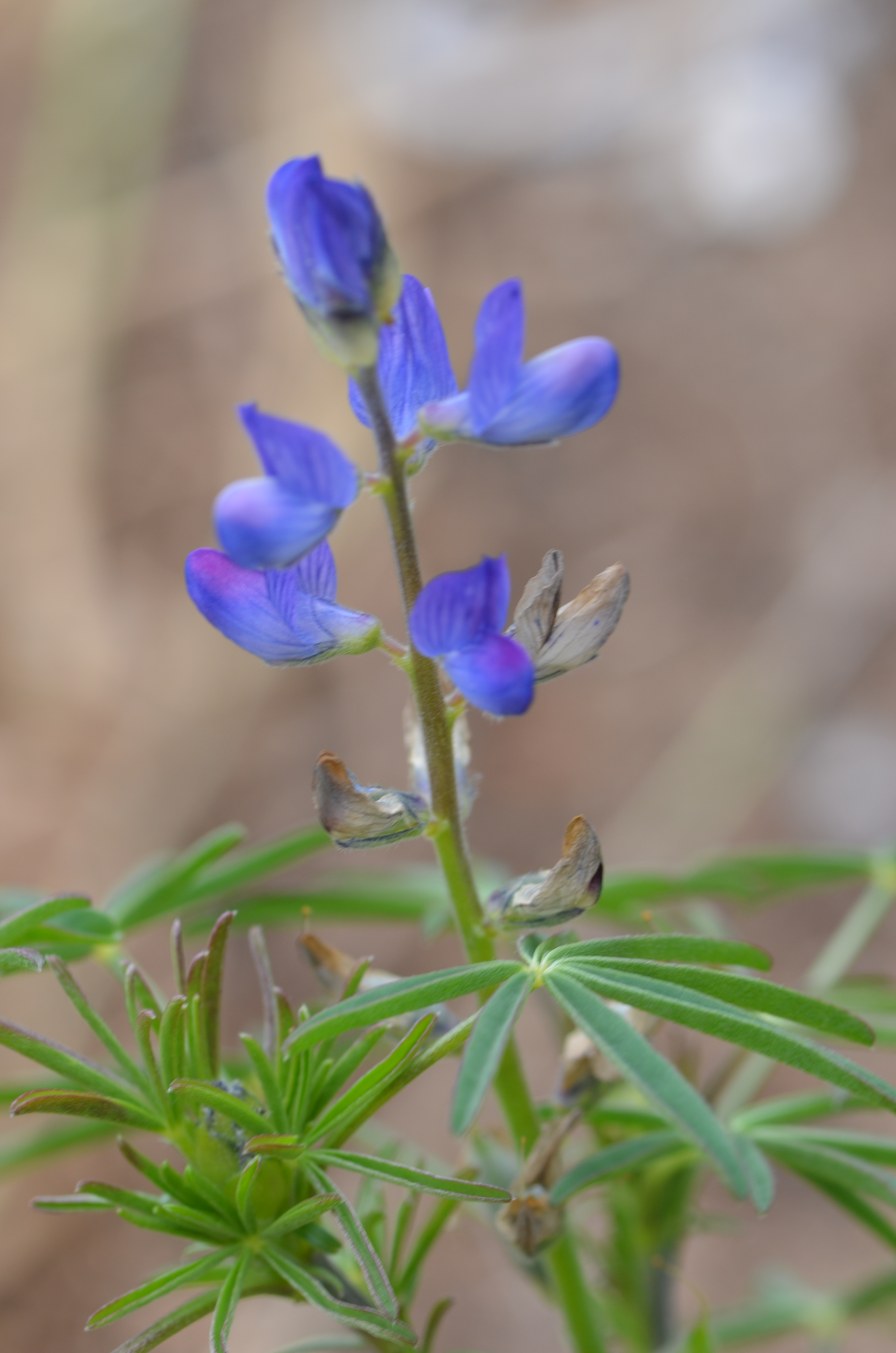
Lupinus cosentinii

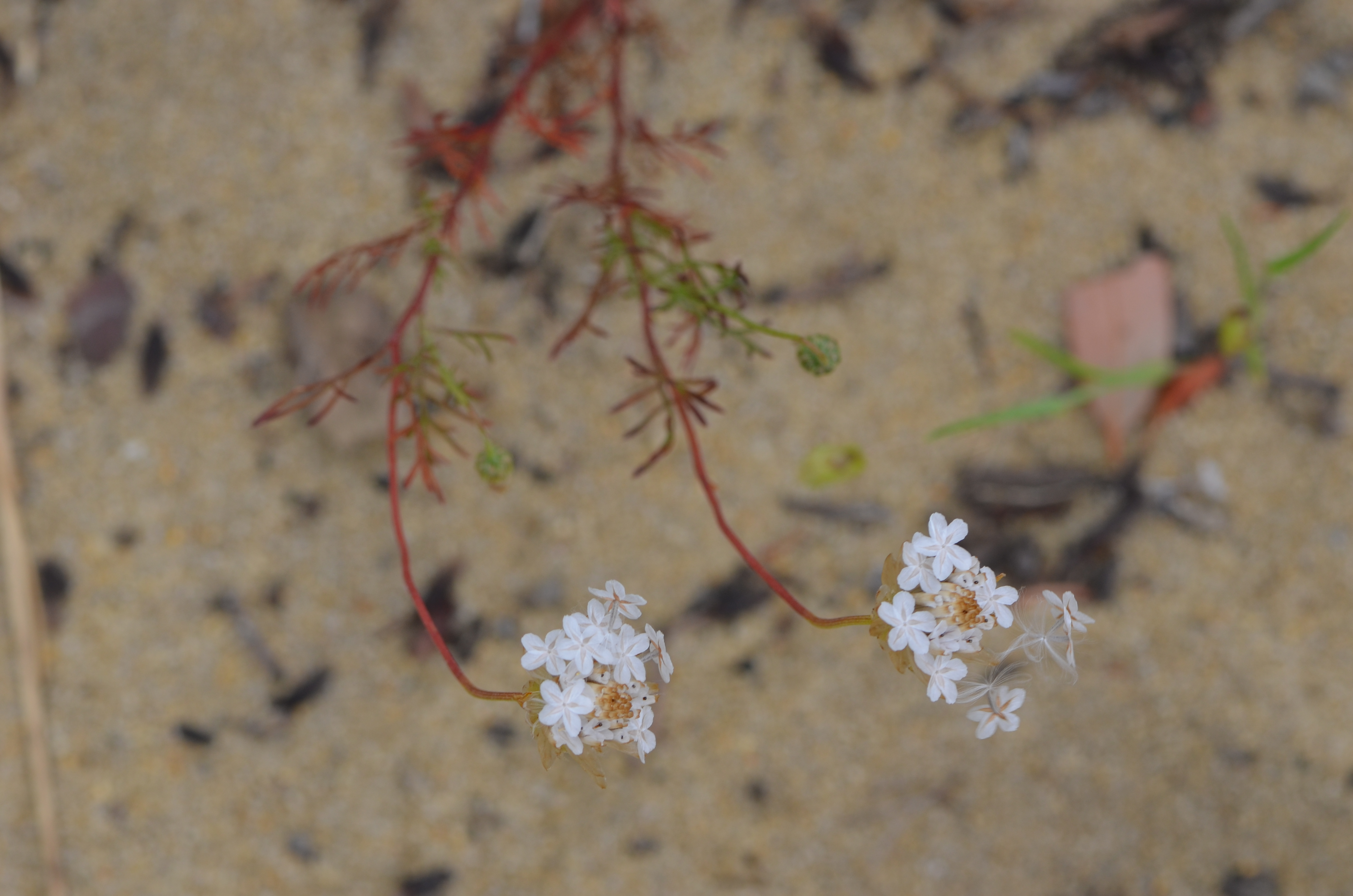
Ursinia anthemoides

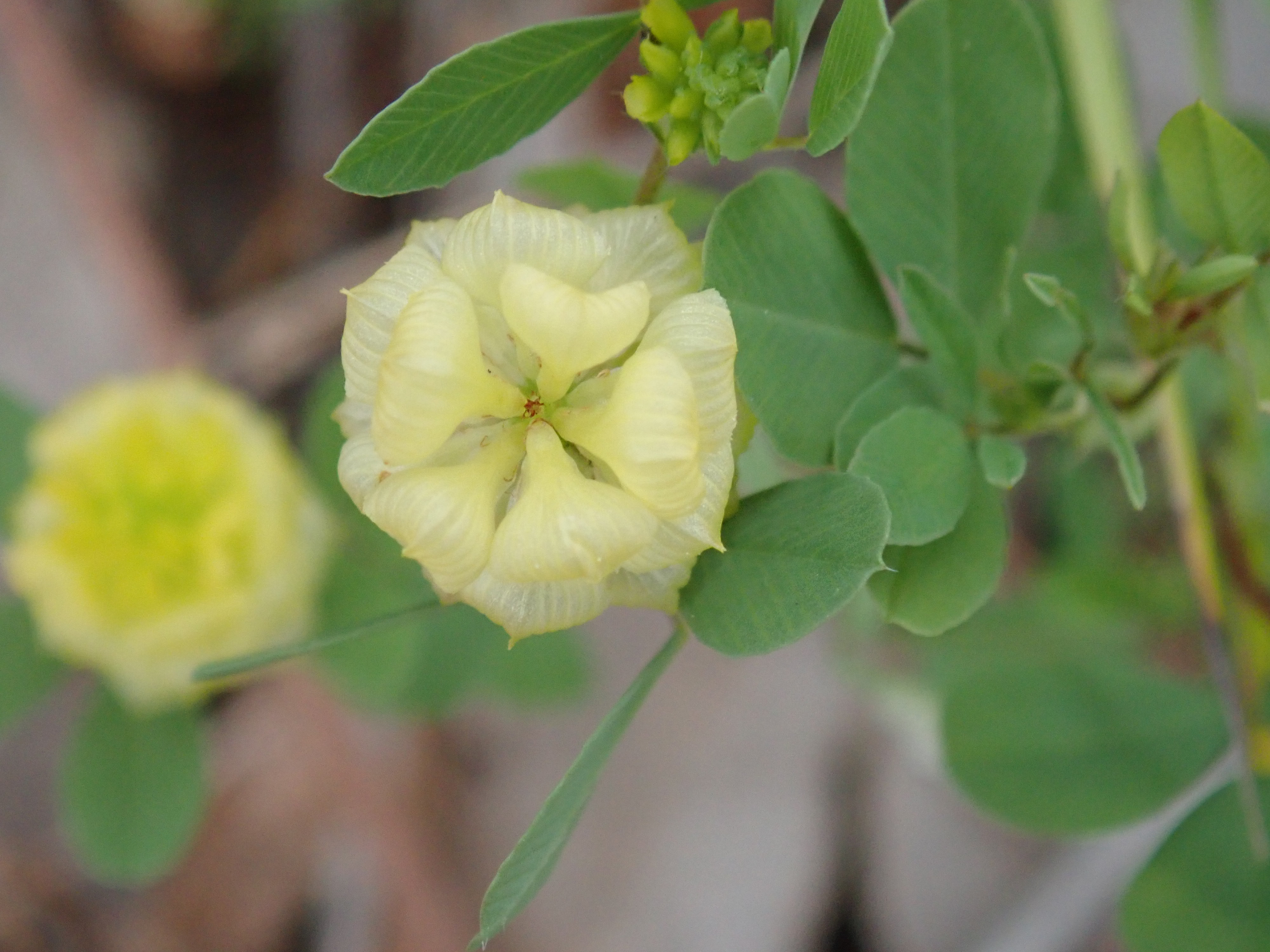
Trifolium campestre
