= Pterostylis dilatata =

Robust snail orchid

Scientific classification
- Kingdom: Plantae
- Clade: Tracheophytes
- Clade: Angiosperms
- Clade: Monocots
- Order: Asparagales
- Family: Orchidaceae
- Subfamily: Orchidoideae
- Tribe: Cranichideae
- Genus: Pterostylis
- Species: P. dilatata

Binomial name
- Pterostylis dilatata A.S.George

Synonyms
- Linguella dilatata (A.S.George) D.L.Jones & M.A.Clem.; Diplodium dilatatum (A.S.George) D.L.Jones & M.A.Clem.

Species of orchid

Pterostylis dilatata, commonly known as the robust snail orchid, is a species of orchid which is endemic to the south-west of Western Australia. Non-flowering plants have a rosette of leaves but flowering plants lack a rosette and have a single green and white flower on a flowering stem with stem leaves. The flowers appear in winter and have lateral sepals which almost close off the front of the flower.

== Description ==
Pterostylis dilatata is a terrestrial, perennial, deciduous, herb with an underground tuber and when not flowering, a rosette lying flat on the ground. Flowering plants lack a rosette but have a single green and white flower on a flowering stem 50–150 mm (2–6 in) tall with three to five stem leaves. The stem leaves are 4–20 mm (0.2–0.8 in) long and 1–4 mm (0.04–0.2 in) wide. The flower is green and white, 18–24 mm (0.7–0.9 in) long, 6–8 mm (0.2–0.3 in) wide. The dorsal sepal and petals form a hood over the column with the petals flared and the dorsal sepal having a short point. The lateral sepals are erect, fused for most of their length except for their thread-like tips which are 11–15 mm (0.4–0.6 in) long. The lateral sepals are in close contact with the gales and have a bulging sinus between them. The labellum is about 6 mm (0.2 in) long, 2 mm (0.08 in) wide and not visible outside the intact flower. Flowering occurs from May to August.

== Taxonomy and naming ==
Pterostylis dilatata was first formally described in 1984 by Alex George from a specimen collected near Bluff Knoll. The description was published in Nuytsia. The specific epithet (dilatata) is a Latin word meaning "spread out", "enlarged" or "extended" referring to the bloated base of the flower.

== Distribution and habitat ==
The robust snail orchid grows in shrubland, woodland and in soil pockets on granite outcrops between Geraldton and Israelite Bay in the Avon Wheatbelt, Esperance Plains, Geraldton Sandplains, Jarrah Forest, Swan Coastal Plain biogeographic regions of Western Australia.

== Conservation status ==
Pterostylis dilatata is classified as "not threatened" by the Government of Western Australia Department of Parks and Wildlife.
