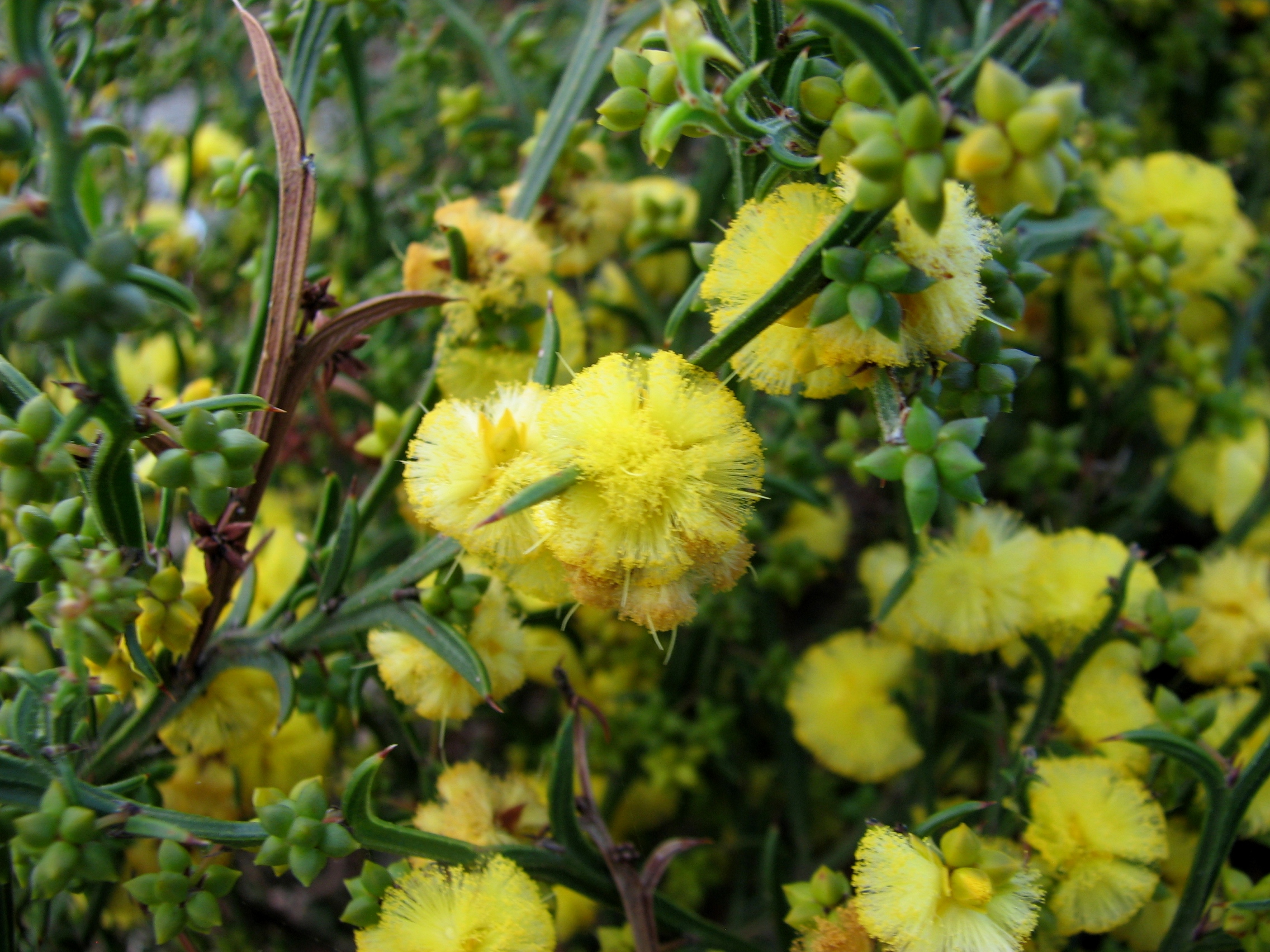
- In the Royal Botanic Gardens, Cranbourne

Scientific classification
- Kingdom: Plantae
- Clade: Embryophytes
- Clade: Tracheophytes
- Clade: Spermatophytes
- Clade: Angiosperms
- Clade: Eudicots
- Clade: Rosids
- Order: Fabales
- Family: Fabaceae
- Subfamily: Caesalpinioideae
- Clade: Mimosoid clade
- Genus: Acacia
- Species: A. stenoptera

Binomial name
- Acacia stenoptera Benth.
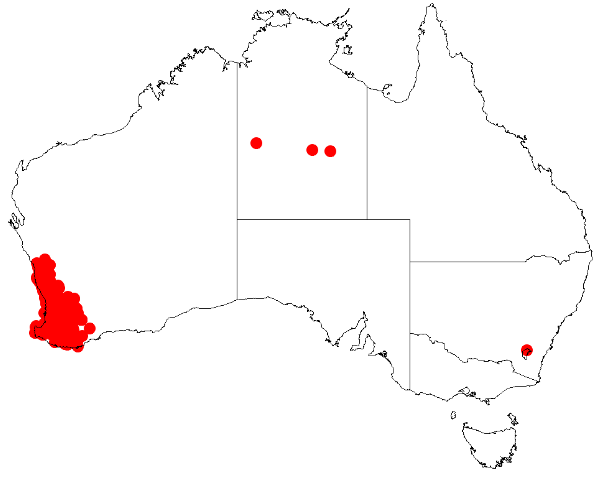
- Occurrence data from AVH

Synonyms
- Racosperma stenopterum (Benth.) Pedley

= Acacia stenoptera =

Narrow winged wattle

Species of legume

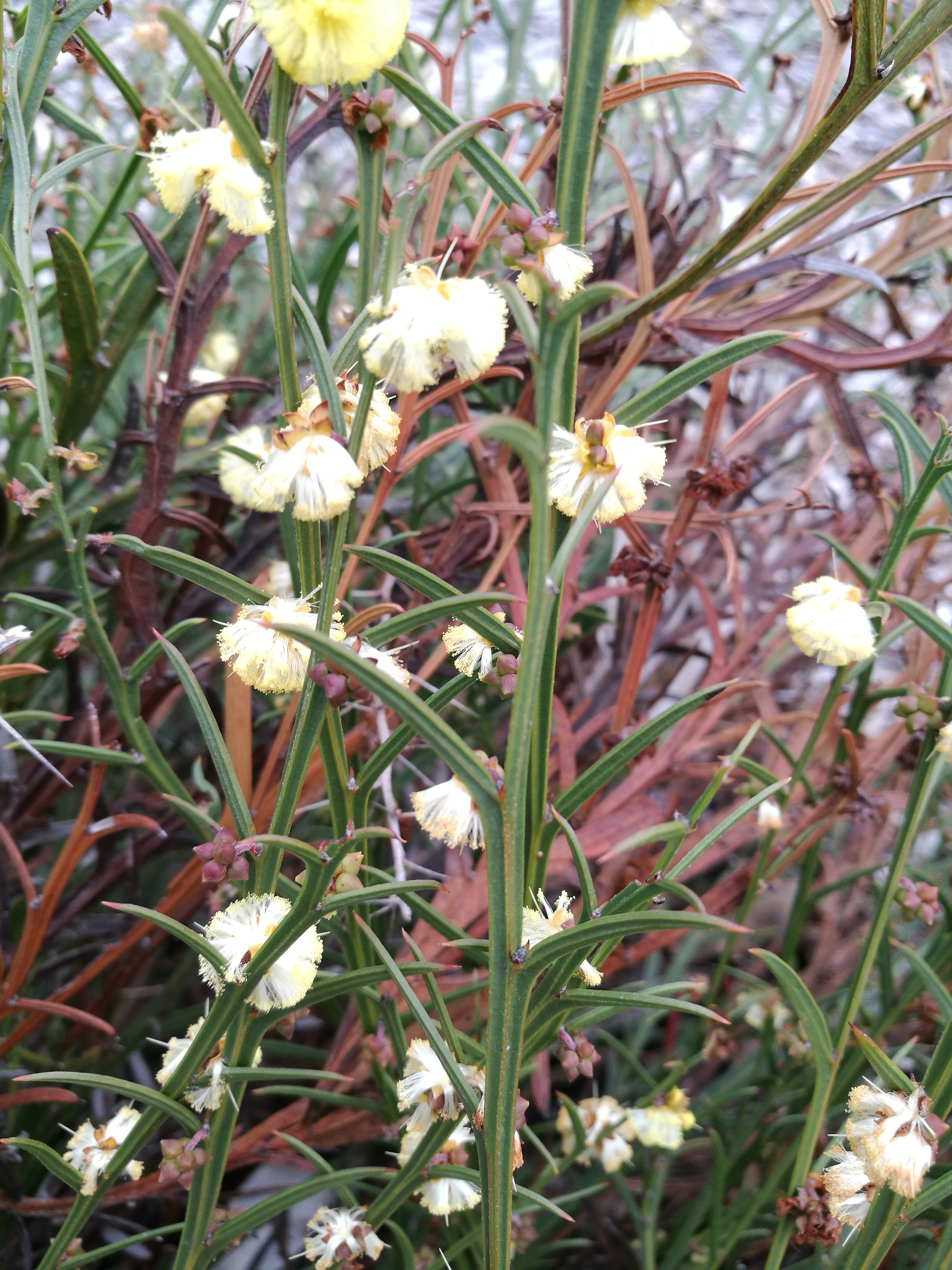
Stem, flowers and foliage

Acacia stenoptera, commonly known as narrow-winged wattle, is a species of wattle that is endemic to the south-west of Western Australia.

== Description ==
It is a rigid and prickly shrub that typically grows to a height of 0.2 to 0.7 metres (0.7 to 2.3 ft) but can reach as high as 2 m (7 ft). It can have a scrambling, sprawling or tangled erect habit. The shrub has ridged stems and curving spine-tipped phyllodes that form continuous wings along the stem. It produces globular, cream or yellow flowerheads between March and December in the species' native range. After flowering it will produce quadrangular seed pods that are 3 to 7 centimetres (1.2 to 2.8 in) long with prominent ridges.

== Taxonomy ==
The species was first formally described by the botanist George Bentham in 1842 as part of William Jackson Hooker work Notes on Mimoseae, with a synopsis of species as published in the London Journal of Botany.

The species was reclassified as Racosperma stenopterum in 2003 by Leslie Pedley then transferred back to the genus Acacia in 2006.

== Distribution ==
The shrub is found from the Mid West, Wheatbelt, Peel, South West and Great Southern regions of Western Australia where it is found in a variety of habitats growing in sandy soils often around laterite.

== See also ==
- List of Acacia species
