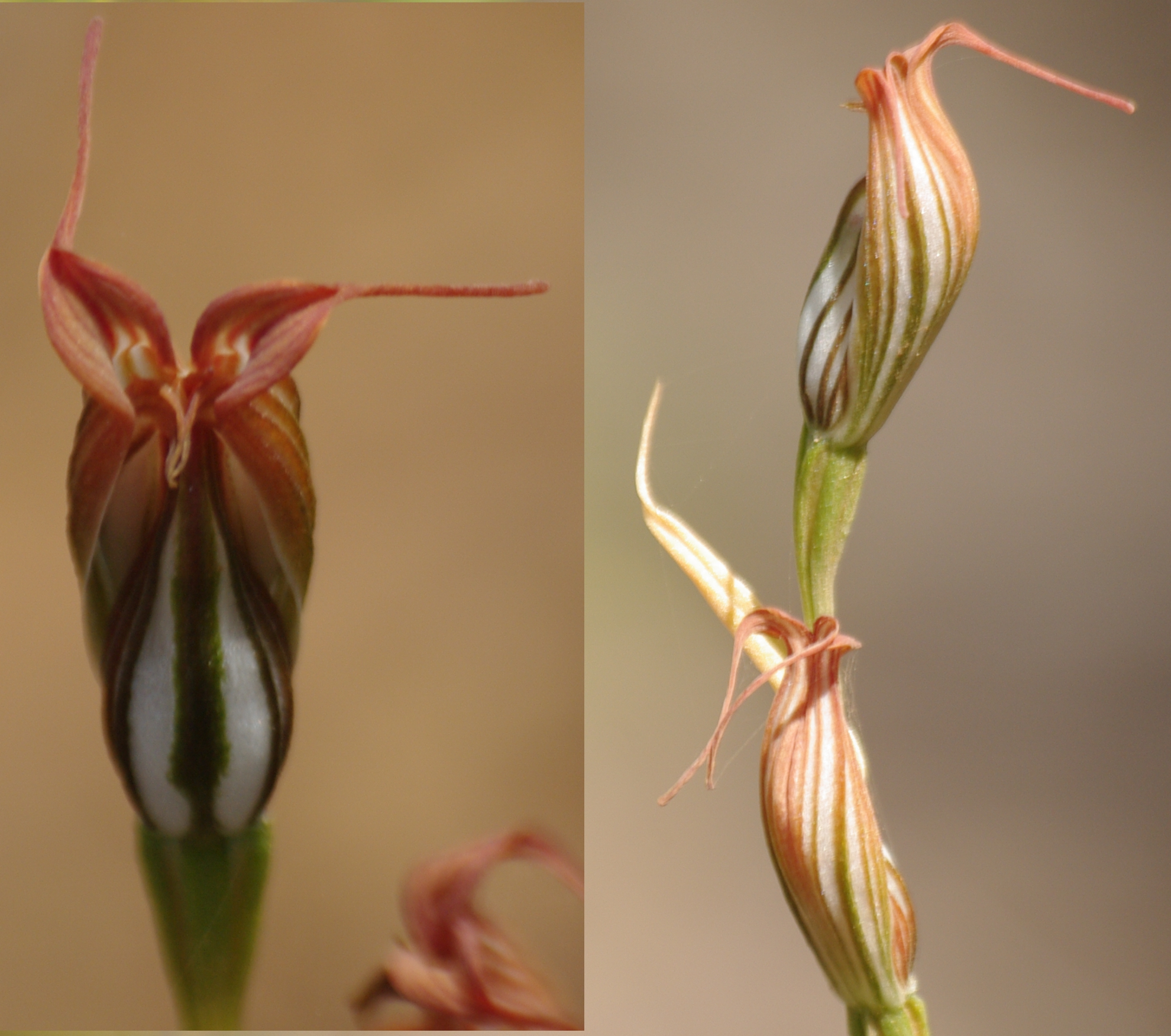
- Flowers of Pterostylis recurva

Scientific classification
- Kingdom: Plantae
- Clade: Tracheophytes
- Clade: Angiosperms
- Clade: Monocots
- Order: Asparagales
- Family: Orchidaceae
- Subfamily: Orchidoideae
- Tribe: Cranichideae
- Genus: Pterostylis
- Species: P. recurva

Binomial name
- Pterostylis recurva Benth.

Synonyms
- Stamnorchis recurva (Benth.) D.L.Jones & M.A.Clem.

= Pterostylis recurva =

Jug orchid

Species of orchid

Pterostylis recurva commonly known as the jug orchid, recurved shell orchid, antelope orchid or bull orchid, is a plant in the orchid family Orchidaceae and is endemic to the south-west of Western Australia. It is a relatively common orchid which has up to four jug-shaped or funnel-shaped white flowers with green and brown lines and markings. Non-flowering plants have a rosette of leaves on a short stalk.

== Description ==
Pterostylis recurva, is a terrestrial, perennial, deciduous, herb with an underground tuber. Non-flowering plants have a rosette of between three and seven leaves 7–40 mm (0.3–2 in) long and 5–15 mm (0.2–0.6 in) wide. Flowering plants lack a rosette but have between ten and sixteen stem leaves which are 30–50 mm (1–2 in) long and 10–12 mm (0.4–0.5 in) wide with their bases wrapped around the flowering stem. Up to four white flowers with green and brown lines are borne on the flowering stem which is 150–900 mm (6–40 in) high. The flowers are jug-shaped or funnel-shaped, 30–35 mm (1.2–1.4 in) long and 15–25 mm (0.6–1 in) wide. The dorsal sepal and petals form a hood or "galea" over the column with the dorsal sepal having a narrow tip 4–6 mm (0.2–0.2 in) long. The lateral sepals are joined for about half their length and suddenly taper to narrow tips 23–26 mm (0.91–1.0 in) long which turn sharply downwards. The labellum is reddish, insect-like and held inside the flower except for its tip. Flowering occurs from August to October.

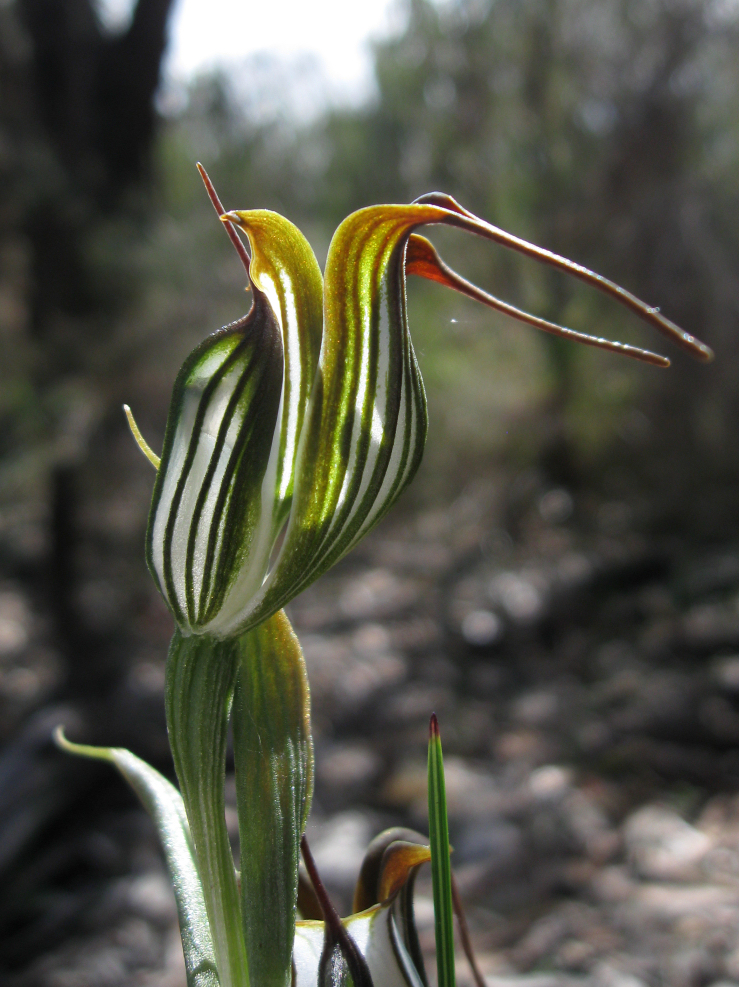
Pterostylis recurva, the 'Jug Orchid'. In Kings Park, Perth, West Australia.

== Taxonomy and naming ==
Pterostylis recurva was first formally described in 1873 by George Bentham and the description was published in Flora Australiensis. The specific epithet (recurva) is a Latin word meaning "bent backward" referring to the downcurved lateral sepals.

== Distribution and habitat ==
The jug orchid is found in woodland, shrubland, forest and in shallow soil on granite outcrops. It grows in sand, clay, laterite and gravel soils and is common and widespread between Geraldton and Israelite Bay.

== Conservation ==
Pterostylis recurva is classified as "not threatened" by the Western Australian Government Department of Parks and Wildlife.
