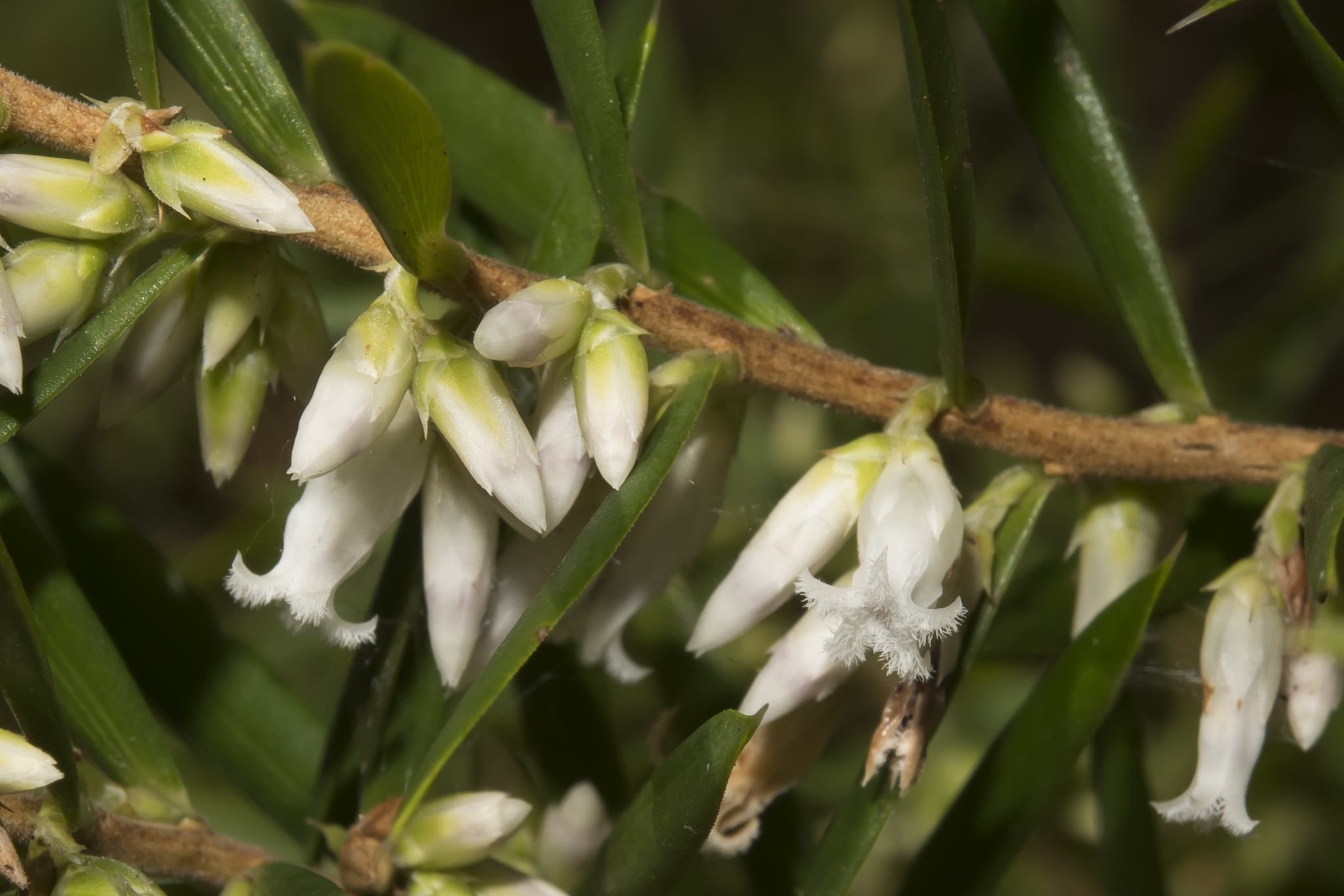

Scientific classification
- Kingdom: Plantae
- Clade: Tracheophytes
- Clade: Angiosperms
- Clade: Eudicots
- Clade: Asterids
- Order: Ericales
- Family: Ericaceae
- Genus: Styphelia
- Species: S. propinqua

Binomial name
- Styphelia propinqua (R.Br.) Spreng.
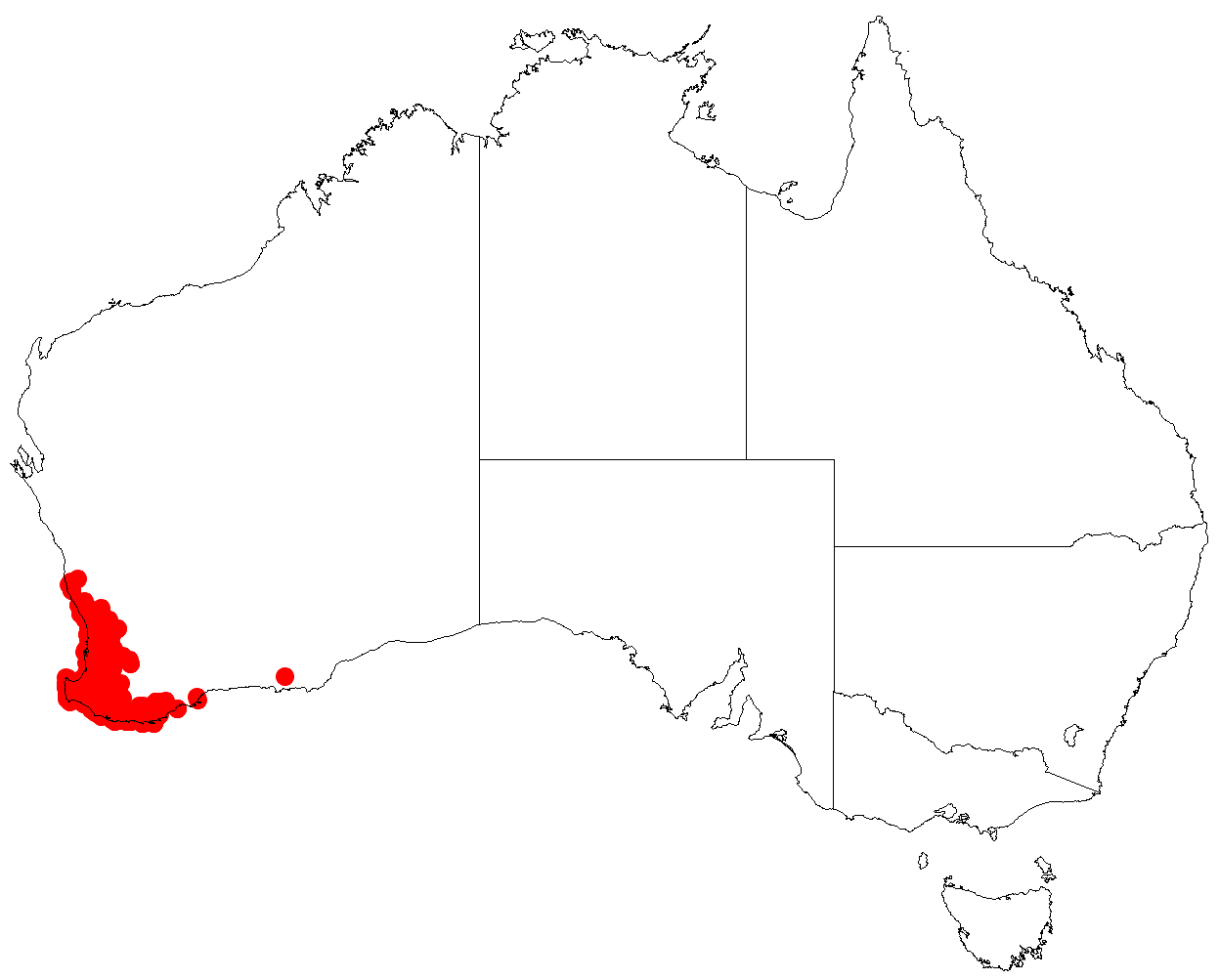
- Occurrence data from AVH

Synonyms
- Leucopogon propinquus R.Br.; Leucopogon pungens Sond.; Styphelia pungens (Sond.) F.Muell.

= Styphelia propinqua =

Species of shrub

Styphelia propinqua is a species of flowering plant in the heath family Ericaceae and is endemic to the south-west of Western Australia. It is an erect, rigid shrub with linear leaves and white tube-shaped flowers that are bearded inside.

== Description ==
Styphelia propinqua is an erect, rigid shrub that typically grows to a height of 1.9–1.2 m (6 ft 3 in – 3 ft 11 in). Its leaves are linear, 12–24 mm (0.47–0.94 in) long with the edges curved downwards and an almost sharply-pointed tip. The flowers are usually borne in groups of 2 or 3, sometimes 3 or 4, in leaf axils on a short peduncle with small bracts and bracteoles less than half as long as the sepals. The sepals are about 3 mm (0.12 in) long and the petals are joined at the base, forming a tube shorter than the sepals but with lobes longer than the petal tube and strongly turned back. The fruit is almost spherical drupe 8.5 mm (0.33 in) long with a thick, hard endocarp.

== Taxonomy ==
This species was first formally described in 1810 by Robert Brown who gave it the name Leucopogon propinquus in his Prodromus Florae Novae Hollandiae et Insulae Van Diemen. It was transferred in 1824 to the genus Styphelia as S. propinqua by Kurt Polycarp Joachim Sprengel. The specific epithet (propinqua) means "near" or "resembling another species".

== Distribution ==
Styphelia propinqua is widespread in the Avon Wheatbelt, Esperance Plains, Geraldton Sandplains, Jarrah Forest, Swan Coastal Plain and Warren bioregions of south-western Western Australia, and is listed as "not threatened" by the Western Australian Government Department of Biodiversity, Conservation and Attractions.
