= Firetail =

Firetail is a common name for several bird species:

- Red-browed firetail, Neochmia temporalis, or red-browed finch
- Red-faced firetail, Neochmia ruficauda, star finch
- Beautiful firetail, Stagonopleura bella
- Diamond firetail, Stagonopleura guttata
- Red-eared firetail or Western firetail, Stagonopleura oculata
