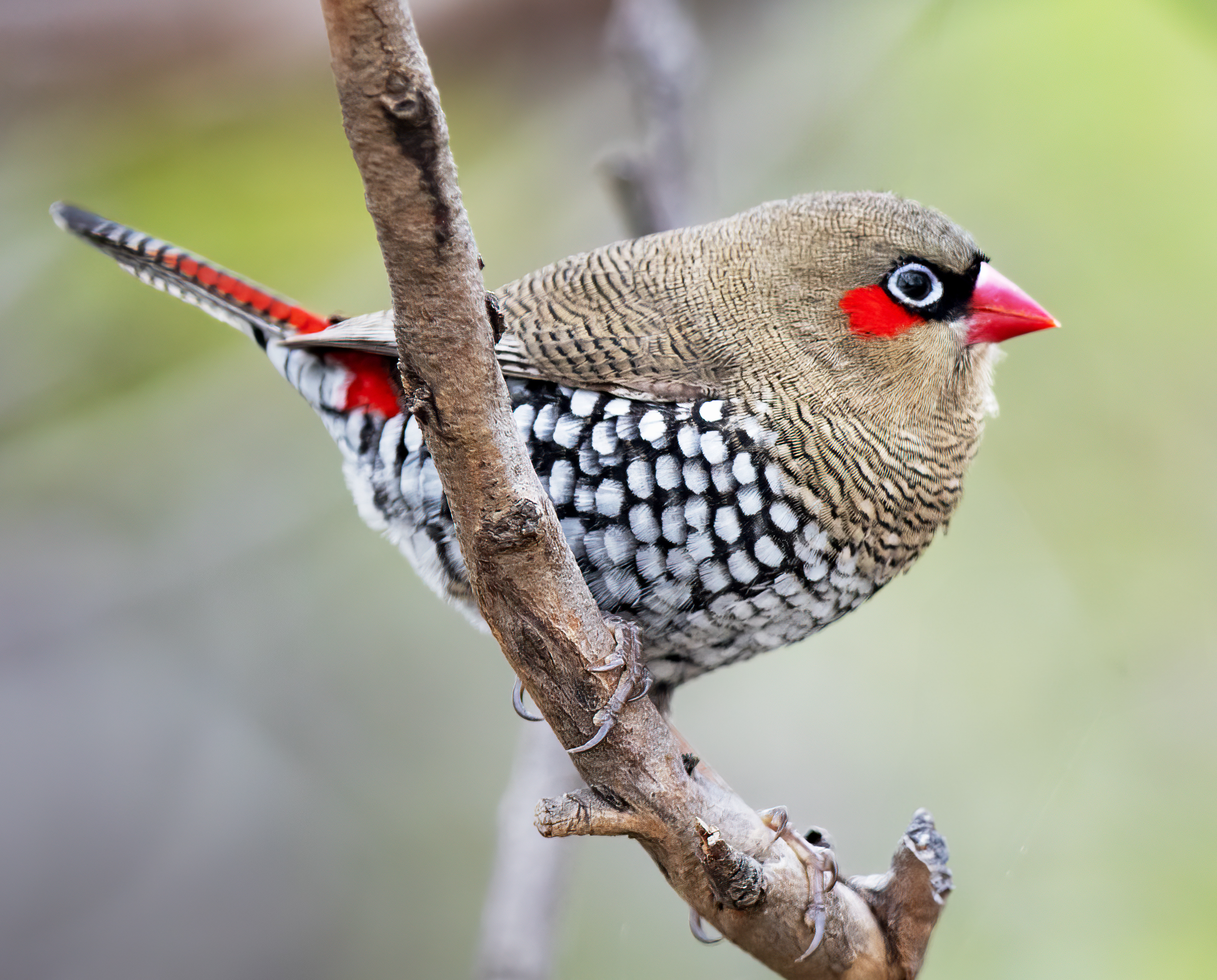

Conservation status
- Least Concern (IUCN 3.1)

Scientific classification
- Kingdom: Animalia
- Phylum: Chordata
- Class: Aves
- Order: Passeriformes
- Family: Estrildidae
- Genus: Stagonopleura
- Species: S. oculata

Binomial name
- Stagonopleura oculata (Quoy & Gaimard, 1832)
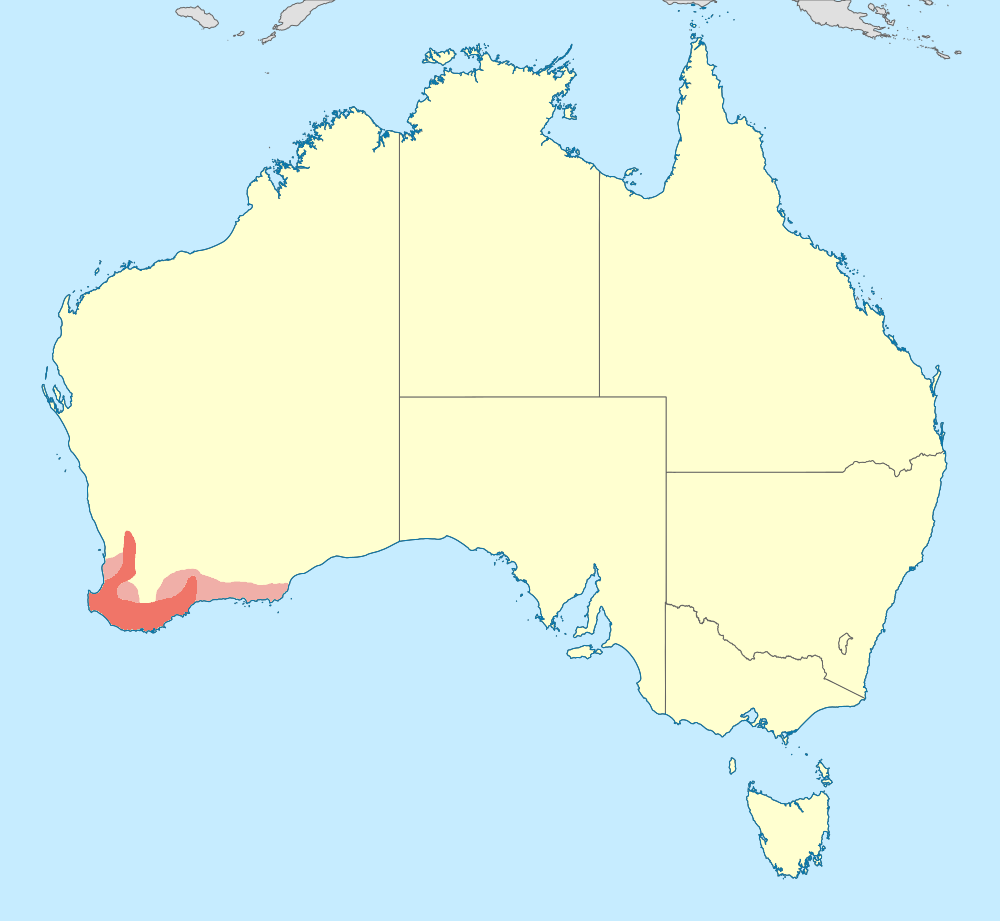
- Range of red-eared firetail

= Red-eared firetail =

Species of bird

The red-eared firetail (Stagonopleura oculata), also known as the boorin, is a small finch-like species of bird. It occurs in dense wetland vegetation of coastal to sub-coastal regions in Southwest Australia. Its appearance is considered appealing, with white spots, black barring and vivid crimson marks at the ear and upper tail. Red-eared firetails are usually only glimpsed briefly, if at all, as they move rapidly and discreetly through their habitat. Most observations occur when their soft voice is heard, or in flight when flushed from the dense scrub. Males and females are similar in colouring and bond as lifelong pairs that occupy a territory centred on their roosting and brooding nest site. The species occupies a similar ecological niche to the beautiful firetail (Stagonopleura bella) found in the east of Australia, although unlike other species of the genus they only occasionally group together and are almost never seen in large flocks.

The red-eared firetail is rare in captivity, being neither recommended nor generally permitted, as they require expertise and a large specialised environment to maintain their secretive habits; however, the observations in avicultural literature have supported and contributed to knowledge of its behaviour. Despite their shyness toward other birds and people, they are known to be less so when venturing out to bird feeders. The species is not easily confused with other birds in its native habitat, excepting perhaps the red-browed finch (Neochmia temporalis) that has escaped captivity and bred in the region.

== Taxonomy ==
The red-eared firetail was described by the French zoologists Jean René Constant Quoy and Joseph Paul Gaimard in 1832. They coined the binomial name Fringilla oculata. (Note: Although the volume of the Voyage de la corvette l'Astrolabe has 1830 on the title page it was not published until 1832.) The description was published in the zoology volume of Dumont d'Urville's account of the expedition aboard the Astrolabe, based on a specimen that Quoy and Gaimard had collected at King George Sound. Their publication preceded the entry as Estrelda oculea in John Gould's Birds of Australia (1848), this later description making an unnecessary emendation to the spelling of the epithet oculata. Gould's Handbook to the Birds of Australia (1865) names the bird Zonæginthus oculeus with a citation to Cabanis' 1853 description under the same name. The specific epithet oculatus (marked with eyes, conspicuous) is a Latin term derived from oculus (eye) that was later interpreted by authors (Gould, Cayley) to refer to the white spots as eye-like; however, Quoy and Gaimard seem to have meant "conspicuous" since they named the bird French: sénégali oculé which refers to the highly noticeable, eye-adjacent red ear patch.

No infraspecific variation for the species is cited in avicultural or ornithological literature. A typical description of a new subspecies, Zonaeginthus oculatus gaimardi, published by G. M. Mathews in 1923 is only mentioned as a synonym for the species. While no subspecies are recognised, several varying characteristics in the population have been identified: a sub-population—near the coast from Cape Arid to Cape Le Grand and islands of the Recherche Archipelago—are notably paler and geographically isolated by a strip of arid land twenty kilometres wide. Johnstone and Storr (2004) reported an individual at Ravensthorpe to have pinkish tips to the feathers on its breast. A description as a subgeneric arrangement, Stagonopleura (Zonaeginthus) oculata, was published in 2006, confirming the presumed alliance to its sister species Stagonopleura (Zonaeginthus) bellus—the beautiful firetail—that was suggested by Gould and subsequent authors.

Earlier names for this population of birds in the Nyungar language were recorded by the field researcher John Gilbert and published in Gould's Birds of Australia and handbook. Similar names with variant spellings were given for the districts of King George Sound, Darling Range, and Perth by Serventy and Whittell in their mid-twentieth century A Handbook of the Birds of Western Australia (with the exception of the Kimberley Division) (1948). A recommended orthography and pronunciation list of all published names has proposed boorin, dwerdengolngani, and djiri in preference to later vernacular. Other names include red-eared firetail finch, Western firetail, red-eared finch, and the ambiguous zebra finch. The IOC World Bird List recommends "Red-eared Firetail" as the preferred English name and orthography. Gilbert, via Gould, reported that the Swan River colonists had named the bird "native sparrow". The attraction of the species to the seed-bearing cones of sheoak (Allocasuarina) inspired the local name of "casuarina finch" in the Pemberton area.

The red-eared firetail is allied to the family Estrildidae of the avian order Passeriformes. Prior to its separation to the genus Stagonopleura, the species was classified as Emblema oculata.

== Description ==
The red-eared firetail is a small grass-finch with black-barred and white-spotted plumage, distinguished by its scarlet bill, black mask, and bright crimson red patch behind the eye and at the rump. The plumage of the upper parts is olive-brown and the breast is buff-brown, both of which are thinly barred black. White spots appear on the blackish underparts. The female closely resembles the male, except when his colouring intensifies during the breeding season.

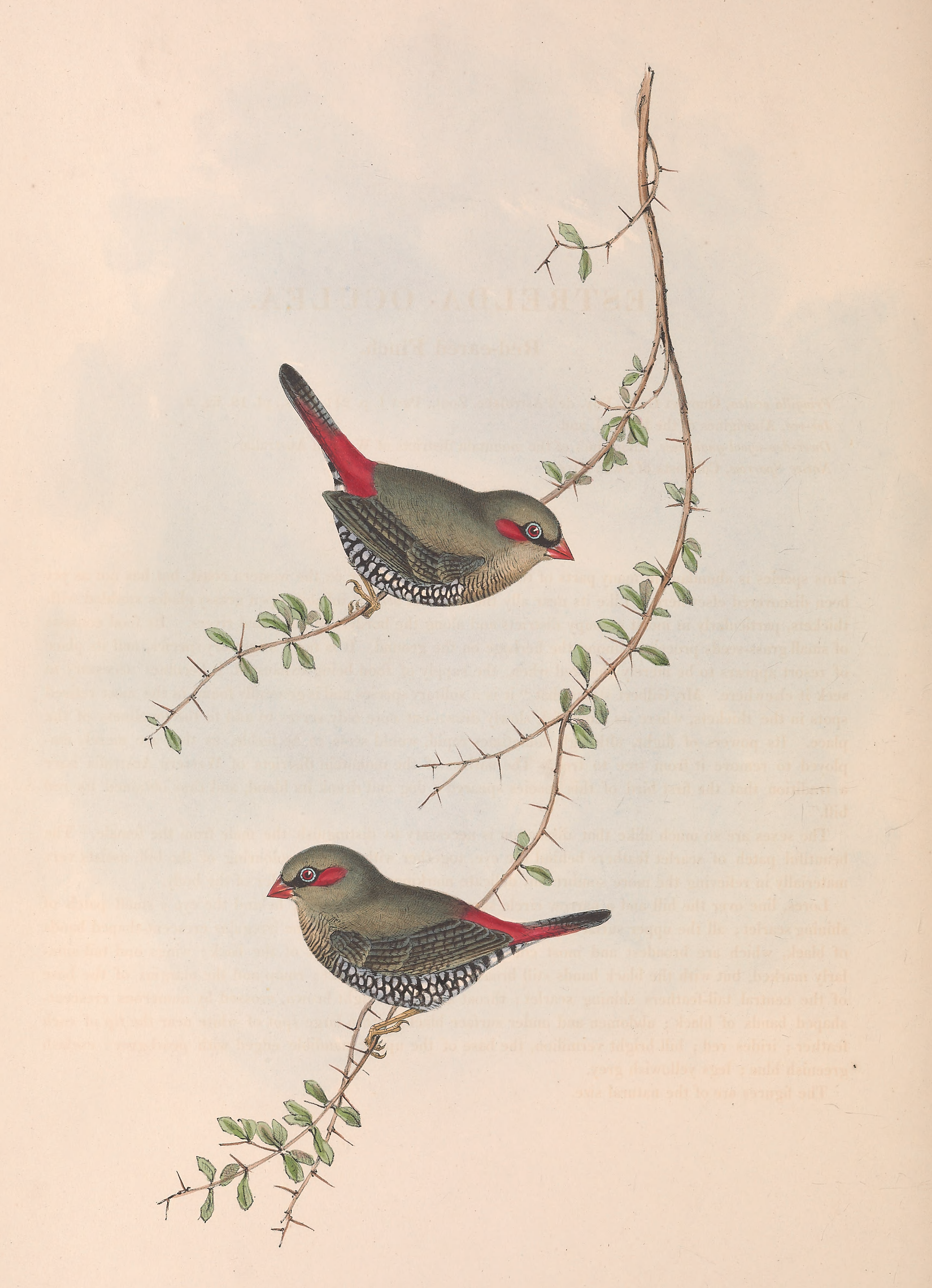
Lithograph showing a male and female from Gould's Birds of Australia, 1848.

The adult plumage is crossed with black vermiculated lines, finely at the nape and crown and more strongly at the scapular feathers, upper-wing coverts, back, and the mantle; these sinuous black markings appear on otherwise greyish-brown upperparts. A similar patterning, in a dusky black colour, is finer at the brown throat and cheek and bolder at the grey-buff of the foreneck. The feathers of the underparts—undertail coverts, abdomen and flank—are white with a black margin and there is barring that outlines the distinct spots. The light brown thigh is slightly crossed with black. Paler lines cross the brown coverts under the tail. The secondary flight feathers and coverts are also greyish brown, with grey-black barring. The primaries and their coverts are dark brown; the outer primaries have a thin margin of a paler brown. A deep shade of crimson is apparent on the rump and tail coverts. A thin black band extends across the frons, broadening at the lores and circling the eyes to give a masked appearance, contrasting the distinctive patch of crimson at the ear coverts and scarlet of the bill; this mask is comparatively larger in males when closely observed. The colour of the tail feathers is a dusky shade of brown with fine black barring and the central tail feathers become crimson toward the coverts.

Descriptions of the iris are as red or dark brown, the eye-ring as pale blue, and the legs as dark- or pink-brown. The bill of both sexes is red, although a coating on the bill of the male intensifies its colour during the breeding season. The average size of the adult is around 125 millimetres (mm) in length. The weight of males is 11.4–16.0 grams, females have a narrower range of 12.5–13.6 grams. Using a sample of thirty males and fifteen females, the average length in of the wing is 56.2 mm, bill 11.8 mm, tail 43.7 mm, and tarsus 17.0 mm for the male; the female has an average length of wing at 56.4 mm, bill 11.6 mm, tail 42.4 mm, and tarsus 17.4 mm.

The juvenile plumage resembles the adult, without the deep crimson ear patch and spotted belly. When observed in captivity, the white spots appeared first, beginning at the flank, with the red ear as the last characteristic to emerge. The vermicular bars of the adult plumage are absent at the nape and crown, and are more subdued on the rest of the upper parts. The black at the eyes and lores is absent or nearly so; the distinct red of the upper tail coverts and rump is duller, and underparts are lighter, buff coloured, and mottled rather than spotted. Immature birds usually attain adult plumage within four months although this period is extended if born late in the breeding season. The juvenile's bill begins as a brownish black colour, becoming scarlet between fourteen and twenty two days after fledging, with blue luminous tubercules are evident at the gape. The legs are a duller shade of brown and the naked and white eye-ring is only slightly blue.

The eggshell is pure white, smooth and finely grained, without gloss, but with a salmon-pink tone produced by the contents. The eggs were described as 12 mm × 16 mm in size and oval in shape by Alfred North (1901–14); Forshaw gave the form as "ovate to elliptical ovate". A sample of forty six specimens from nine clutches were taken and noted as 15.9–17.8 mm × 11.9–13.2 mm to give average dimensions of 16.6 mm × 12.4 mm (Johnstone & Storr, 2004). A clutch of six eggs at Torbay (1959) and another of five closer to Albany (1967) were recorded as larger than this average size.

== Ecology ==
The red-eared firetail is a seed eating estrildid, discreet and unusually solitary for an Australian grass finch species. This species often remains unobserved in dense vegetation while foraging in the lower storey. Their presence is revealed by distinctive calls and the bird is most frequently seen when perched high on the limb of a tree such as marri. The individuals form mated pairs rather than grouping. Their individual range is an area around one to two hundred metres across and they may join others while feeding where their territories overlap. Earnest defence of sites only occurs close to the nest, so boundaries between pairs may intersect without incident. Fledglings are eventually fought and driven from the nest site.

The conservation status was at one time listed as rare or of special concern, the current status is as not threatened. It has an estimated global extent of occurrence of 20,000 to 50,000 kilometres squared. The species has been affected by the large-scale clearing of jarrah forest for plantations of pine trees. The IUCN Red List (2016) has classified the species as being of least concern, citing the entry in Threatened and extinct birds of Australia (Garnett, 1992) that notes while much of its habitat is degraded by salinity or destroyed by changes in agricultural and water management, the usually sedentary habits of the species have not impeded their repopulation of suitable habitat. The population is therefore presumed to be stable.

=== Distribution ===
The red-eared firetail is an endemic species of the south-western corner of Australia. The species is uncommon to scarce within its range, although it may be locally common in undisturbed locations, which is typically heavy forests and dense heaths around gullies, rivers, and swamps. The population density increases toward coastal areas of its range, especially at the south. The distribution range along the southern coast extends past Esperance to the east. From the southern coast the species occurs as far north as Cape Naturaliste, Bridgetown, Lake Muir, the Stirling Range, Gairdner River (Calyerup) and the Ravensthorpe Range, and is present off the coast at Bald and Coffin Islands near the city of Albany., The eastern extent of the population at the Esperance Plains region occurs at Cape Arid National Park, and at offshore outcrops of the Recherche Archipelago, such as Middle and Woody Islands. Records are more scarce north of Wungong Brook in the Darling and Stirling ranges, and there is decreasing population density toward inland regions of Fitzgerald River National Park and Ravensthorpe Range. The firetail is rare in the wheat belt and almost non-existent in the Swan Coastal Plain.

The species is thought to breed throughout its distribution range, although this has only been recorded at locations west of longitude 120° East. While regarded as largely sedentary, adults may seasonally relocate outside of the breeding site and immature birds may be driven to new sites where the species is unrecorded in the breeding season.

Changes in land use, such as clearing around frontage at permanent water, has resulted in species becoming absent where it had been previously recorded. Gould described the species as "abundant" around the Swan River colony in 1848, some twenty years after settlement of the region. Serventy noted the species had disappeared from areas near Perth and Pinjarra by the mid-twentieth century, perhaps from the Swan Coastal Plain altogether, though it had persisted at gullies around Mundaring Weir in the Darling Range. The Records (1991) of the Western Australian Museum gave a northernmost location of Glen Forrest in the Darling Range to an area near North Bannister and Mount Saddleback, and confirmed their continued absence from the Swan Coastal plain. However, there are occasional reports of sightings in the largely cleared region, HANZAB notes two seen at Canning Mills in 1997. A study of the population at Cape Le Gand showed a decline in the period 1944–72.

The type locality King George Sound was the source of a later collection made by George Masters for the Australian Museum in 1869. A report on the species for the British journal Ibis by Tom Carter in 1921 noted the occurrence of the species at swamps, common at those dominated by paperbark (Melaleuca) near Albany (1913) and located nests at a wetland near Cape Leeuwin (1916); records are also given for sites around Lake Muir (1913) and at Warren River (March, 1919) in dense scrub below karri forest. Carter had earlier given his observations between Albany and Cape Naturaliste, and noted it was common at springs on limestone hills near Margaret River, Western Australia; he considered a specimen he shot in a karri tree as outside its usual habitat of the dense understorey.

=== Habitat ===
The species is associated with dense vegetation of forest understorey, in paperbark swamps, and on heathland, river frontage, and gullies. The tree species of its wooded habitat are eucalypts, such as Eucalyptus marginata (jarrah), Eucalyptus diversicolor (karri) and Corymbia calophylla (marri), or with Allocasuarina (she-oak), and Melaleuca (paperbark). Habitat includes riparian vegetation amongst or adjacent to eucalypt forest, although this is apparently dependent on the nearby presence of a taller forest ecology and the species is noted as disappearing when native tree species are replaced by pine plantations.

They often occur in locations containing the sedge Lepidosperma tetraquetrum and sheoak species Allocasuarina fraseriana as the seed of these plants is a favoured part of their diet. The common habitat, karri forest, is dominated by eucalypts, the tree species karri is interspersed with stands of jarrah and marri and boorin favour the dense thickets below these giant trees. The Trymalium species karri hazel Trymalium odoratissimum, karri oak Allocasuarina decussata and Bossiaea laidlawiana are typical in these plant associations. They also occur at sheoak stands and paperbark swamps in jarrah forests.

Marginal habitat defined by swamp peppermint (Agonis linearifolia), in association with wiry wattle (Acacia extensa), false baeckea (Astartea fascicularis), and karri hazel, is also favoured by the species. The sedge Lepidosperma angustatum occupies the ground storey of these assemblages, along with Acacia mooreana and Hypocalymma angustifolium. Wet heathland habitat includes dense vegetation of the kwongan sandplains that is interspersed with tall shrubs and mallee. The occurrence at dune vegetation systems records a complex of rushes and sedges with many species of shrubs, including Olearia axillaris, Boronia alata and Acacia decipiens, in low heathland dominated by Jacksonia horrida.

Surveys of earlier study sites in the Darling Range found greater numbers in habitat closer to the Wungong Dam than along its tributaries and surrounding valleys. Casual observations are frequently made close to the carparks at Little Beach, Two Peoples Bay and Porongurup nature reserves, and amongst the heath of the headland at Cape Naturaliste. Some observations have been made in gardens and parks, on forest tracks, and at roadsides where they may occasionally be killed by traffic.

The species occupies a similar niche to Stagonopleura bella, the beautiful firetail, within their respective distribution ranges.

=== Associations ===
Immelmann's remarks on the solitary habits of individuals and mated pairs, in contrast to the gregarious habits of the related beautiful firetail, are largely confirmed by later field researchers, aviculturalists, and casual observations. Immelmann noted that a few young birds may appear together: in jarrah forest, six immature birds might appear in a group, perhaps driven from their parents' territory. Pair bonding is maintained until the death of an individual and mates can be selected before fully mature. The reclusive behaviour is not displayed outside its native habitat and the species has been observed feeding with western rosellas (Platycercus icterotis) and splendid fairy wrens (Malurus splendens) at parkland and gardens. There are records of the species being tamely and regularly drawn to seed at tourist sites like Cape Naturaliste; and, it was casually observed in 2010 with western rosella and rock parrots (Neophema petrophila) at Nornalup. Their discretion in their native habitat, however, was shown in a census (Fitzgerald River, 1994–97) that mist-netted thirteen individuals but failed to make any visual sighting. The nestlings observed at Immelmann's Wungong site were taken by a local python, Morelia spilota imbricata.

Captive red-eared firetails have been observed seeking refuge in the undergrowth of their aviary in response to alarm calls of neighbouring Malurus splendens.

== Behaviour ==
The first study of the species in the field was by John Gilbert, whose notes were printed verbatim in Gould's handbook (1865) and cited by North (1914) and others; the accuracy of his reports has been verified in subsequent research.

It is a solitary species and is generally found in the most retired spots in the thickets, where its mournful, slowly drawn-out note only serves to add to the loneliness of the place. Its powers of flight, although sometimes rapid, would seem to be feeble, as they are merely employed to remove it from tree to tree. The natives of the mountain districts of Western Australia have a tradition that the first bird of this species speared a dog and drank its blood, and thus obtained its red bill.

— John Gilbert, in Gould, Handbook (1865)

An important source of information on the species resulted from a 1960 study undertaken by Klaus Immelmann at Wungong Gorge, a broad depression around permanent water with dense scrub interspersed with marri, where he observed the red-eared firetail's feeding and breeding habits. Knowledge of their behaviour in the field is also supported by the published observations of specialist breeders.

Immelmann remarked that the species' ability to negotiate the dense vegetation of its habitat was more adept than that of other Australian grassfinches. They move along branches by pivoting from "side to side in small hops in an arc-like pattern." Downward, the red-eared firetail moves quickly and acrobatically through the thick foliage.

Observations of the species are usually made when it is disturbed and the individual will fly to a high perch and call briefly before relocating to another part of its territory. The behaviour of the red-eared firetail in captivity is also reported by aviculturalists as mostly secretive and the birds will become anxious in response to strangers. Birds in captivity will tolerate and watch a familiar person and they will eventually resume their movement about the cage. The individuals exhibit a tapping habit when closely observed, using their bill to strike twice or wipe across each branch it lands upon. The species is most active in the early morning, in movement and vocalisation, and curious about any novelty in their aviary. Adults and young use their aviary's roosting nest at night. They are seen bathing themselves in water for extended periods, becoming completely immersed at times.

=== Feeding ===
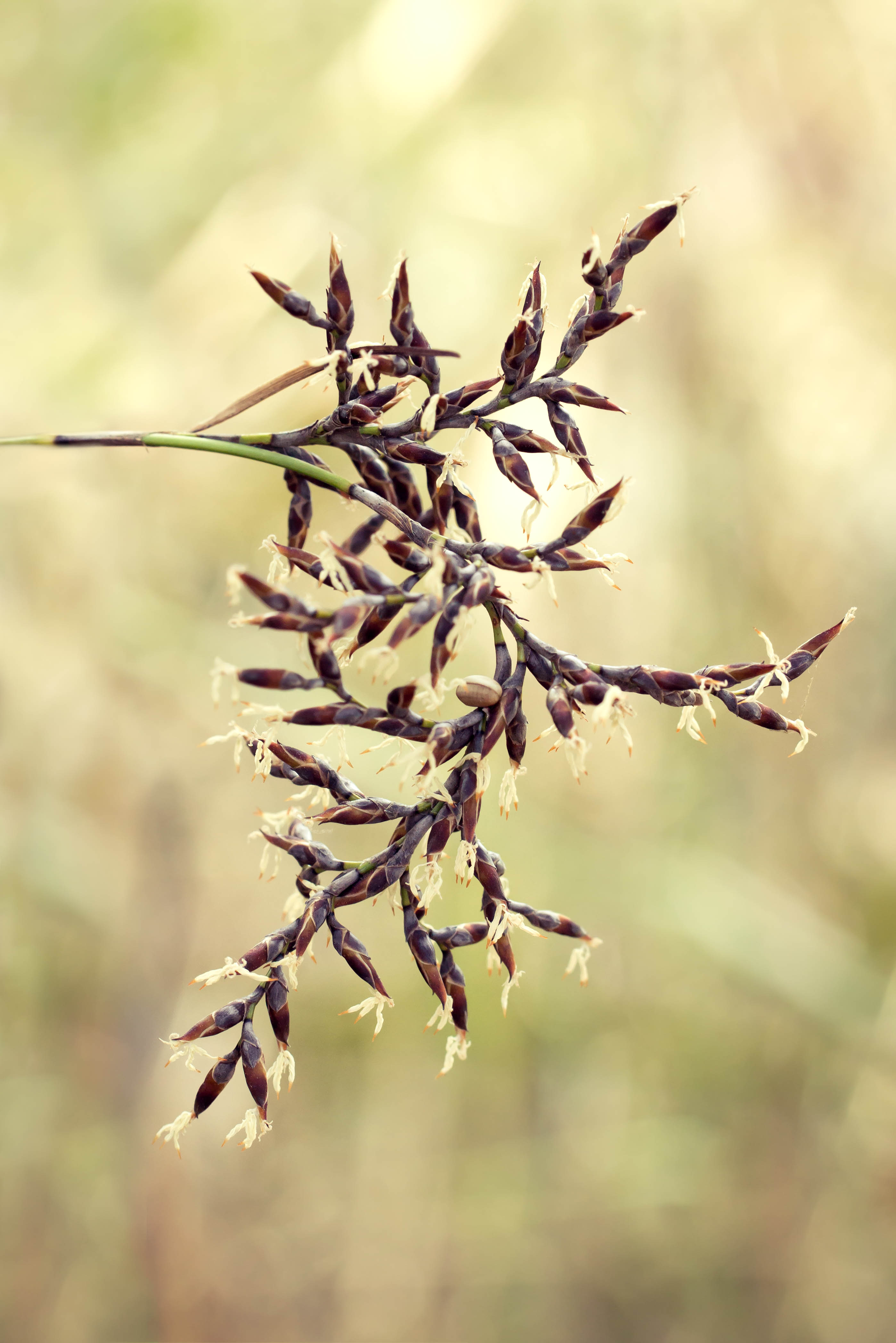
Lepidosperma squamatum

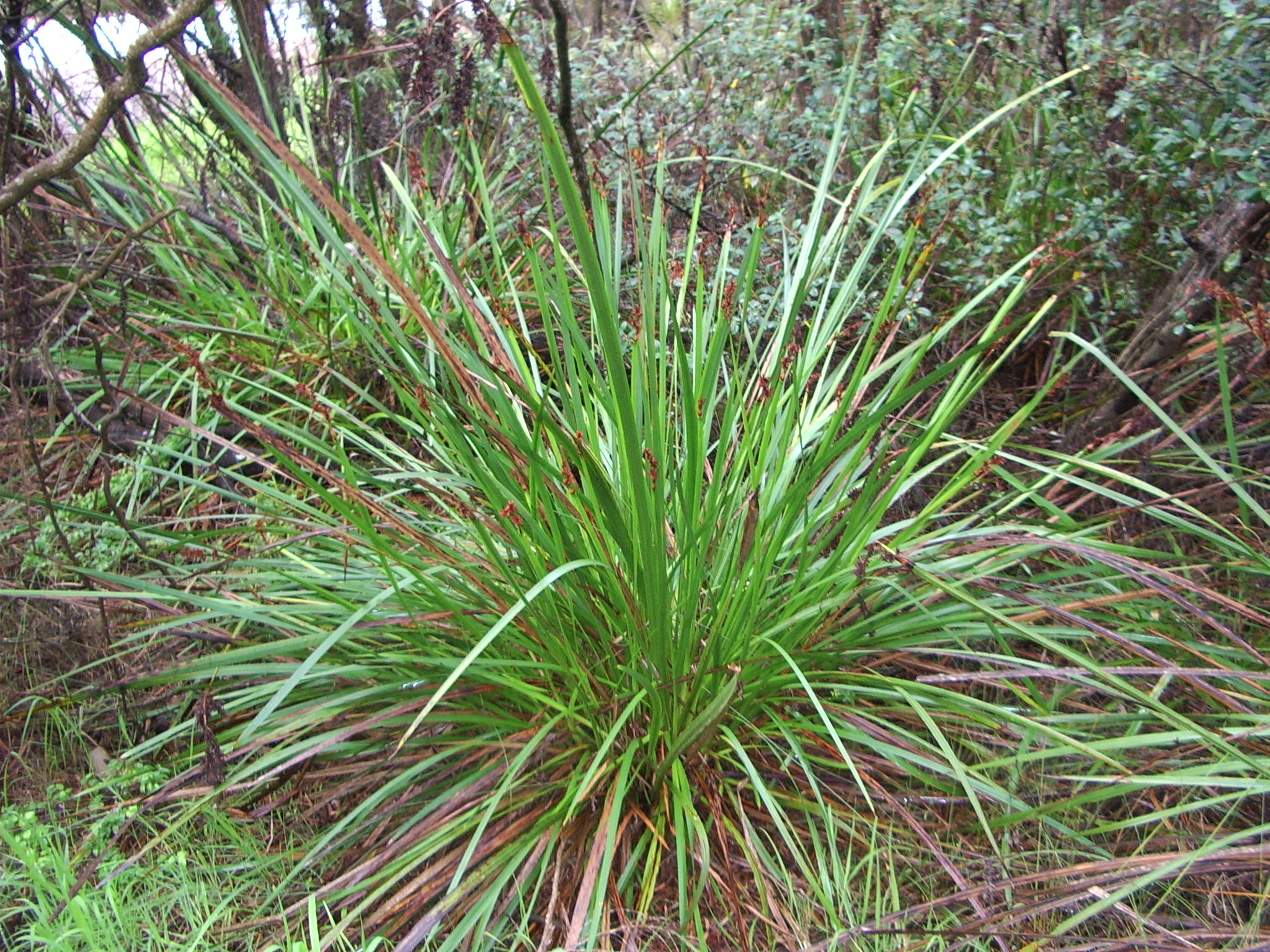
Lepidosperma gladiatum

Amongst Immelmann's observations is the habit of the species to avoid the ground, preferring a perch on lower or fallen branches and twigs when feeding in the understorey. Seed is extracted from grasses by using the bill to bend the stem within reach of the foot; the foot then draws the seedhead through the bill before releasing it to harvest the next stem. The seed of taller plants is accessed by perching close to the source and taking them into the bill directly. When taking to the ground to feed, it again uses its foot and beak to bend the grass sheaths, and then will frequently regain a higher vantage point to survey the surroundings. The species favours seed of sedge species Lepidosperma (Lepidosperma tetraquetrum and Lepidosperma squamatum) but will eat seed from other plants in its habitat. The northern study site in the Darling Range noted the birds fed on seeds from species Lepidosperma angustatum and Bossiaea (pea family Papilionaceae), and the fruit from the karri hazel. Other favoured species include grasses of genus Briza and the cones of Allocasuarina; an early observation of the species dissecting casuarina cones for seed was misinterpreted as a search for insects.

Specimens in captivity will eat green leaf matter, supported by an observation of probable feeding on clover leaves in a maintained lawn at Mundaring Reservoir. Captives have also been found to favour seed of Lepidosperma gladiatum, ripened or not, twisting open the tough casing with a motion of their head. The species is attracted to the seed available in aviaries of parrots, bird feeders in suburban gardens, and managed parkland. It will visit these areas usually singly or in pairs and sometimes with other bird species.

=== Vocalisation ===
Around five separate communication calls of the red-eared firetail had been reported by the late twentieth century. These have been classified in several ways from reports in the field or aviary. Adult vocalisation is distinguished as an identity call, intimate nest-calls, a nest-site call, and a contact or communication call (Pepper, Immelmann) only reported in captives. Additional records in aviculture are for huffing, distress, aggression and alarm calls. The volume of their calls is low, so only heard nearby, and the communication at the nest site is very soft.

Immelmann described the species' identity call as a drawn out oowee with a ventriloquial character that disguises its location. This call is delivered with little evident movement, except at the throat, and the bird assumes a pose with the head held up, a little forward, and the bill closed or only slightly parted; it may be delivered once or up to twenty times in succession. The presumed function of the identity call, which is regularly used during the non-breeding season, is contact with the partner across their territory. The variable tune of the identity note and lengths of rests, one to three times the note's value in each call, is repeated in turn by their mate after several seconds—the communication continues for a few minutes and is re-established around every half hour. During breeding in captive pairs, the tone of the male's call is reported to be higher pitched and the tone of the female quavering. A trembling attempt at the identity note is made by individuals shortly after fledging, likened to a broken toy whistle. The faltering call of the juveniles only loses its quaver at maturity. The parenting call is softer and sonorous; the female's voice is distinguished by an insistent quiver as she attends to fledglings who respond with a sharp and low twitter.

An exchange of calls was also described in Immelmann's study. This intimate nest vocalisation is begun with the arriving parent, who with a closed bill, wings twitching at each note, delivers a twit-twit announcement at the entrance of the nest. The reply from the brooding bird within is a drawled syllable tweet and sharply rapped tit-tit-tit.

Another phrase is termed the nest site call, which may open with a shorter, more richly toned, version of the identity call oowee, and five quick notes of u-u-u-u-u that becomes less insistent. A similar call is reported in adults and juveniles of aviaries with a subsequent phrase of a very soft huh-huh-huh delivered with the breast and throat expanded. A reported variation of the nest site call, three syllables of a zst sound, may be juvenile attempts to produce this very soft huh-huh-huh phrase. A more intimate conversation call has also been noted in captive birds, only discernible within a metre, that repeats a sound transcribed as qwirk or qwark; Immelmann pronounced that this call seemed identical to the communication call of finches. The aviculturalist Pepper also described an alarm call, given in response to perceived threats to its young, that resembled one of "a broody [domestic] hen being removed from her nest". His observations of young in an aviary gives a report of their feeding call—a grating sound that slightly increases in pitch after fledging; the young signal to the parent with a repeated plea of chik and produce the feeding call when attended.

The song of captive species was reported, when courting or alone, as beginning with a whistle like a flute, a note extending over four loud pulses, and ending in repeated grasping sounds. A loud and warbling attempt at this song by a captive, fifteen days after fledging, was observed at a high perch of the cage.

=== Reproduction ===
Pairing of individuals occurs in their first year and this bond remains throughout their life. The breeding season is October to November, perhaps extending to January. The nest is carefully and tightly woven from grassy materials, reinforced with the green tips of plants, forming a rigid down facing spherical construction. The red-eared firetail's nest size, like that of its sister species the beautiful firetail, is the largest of grassfinches in Australia. The number of eggs in a clutch is between four and six, which hatch after an incubation period of 14 days. The total time of incubation duty is equal in length for each parent. The parents attend to the eggs alternately every one and a half to two hours. Each shift begins with a customary exchange between parents of the intimate nest call. When assuming his shift, the male may arrive at the nest with a feather and continue this practice for eight days after the eggs hatch. When the young emerge from their eggs, both parents remain in the nest for several seconds or up to half an hour after a shift change. At night, parents and young remain tightly huddled in the nest. Attempts to violently dislodge nesting birds to test their resolve to remain with progeny, were unsuccessful. After the eggs hatch, the shells are removed from the nest and dropped some thirty to forty metres away. The young born in aviaries remain in the nest until they fledge, recorded as between two and three weeks, and both parents continue to closely attend to their care and feeding after they emerge. A caged bird was observed participating in bathing activity one week after fledging.

Courtship and breeding habits recorded at Immelmann's site in 1960 are supported by later observations and cited in ornithological literature (Storr and Johnstone, 2004; Forshaw and Shephard, 2012; et al.). The male selects a nesting site and presents an overt display—presumably to entice a female—of an inflated pose and issues a rendition of its identity call, interspersed with hopping movements about the branches. The male may continue these gestures for up to 45 minutes, perhaps utilising a length of grass (200–450 mm) that appears to be pierced but is actually held at the point of the bill by a fibre pulled from the base of the stalk. The grass prop—symbolic of nest construction and copulation according to the ethological interpretation of Immelmann—is dangled downward as the male presents the prospective site. The stem can be lost in high wind as it sways beneath the bill. While moving around the site, if the stem is snagged by the undergrowth, the male gives a quick sideways tug of its head. If the gestures fail to solicit the interest of a female the suitor either selects another site or another stem of grass before resuming his efforts. The male abandons his performance when a female responds by investigating the display area, and retires to the precise location he has proposed; at this position, usually a discreet fork in the branches, he drops his grass stem prop and utters his nest site call. If persuaded, the female moves near or onto the position indicated by the male; if dissatisfied she departs to await the next site proposal.

Early reports show nesting sites within a prickly hakea (Hakea sp.) on the coast and a tree or sapling in forest or woodland regions. In forest, the nesting site is hidden high in a tall tree—marri, jarrah, or yate—or the branches of shrubs in the mid-storey, such as melaleuca, hakea, or banksia and amongst creeper or mistletoe. A nest near the town of Denmark, observed by Robert Hall for several days in 1902, was placed between banksia and grasstrees (Xanthorrhoea). The nests of the previous season observed at Cape Leeuwin by Carter (1921), where local boys said they appeared every year, are described as slightly domed structures composed of fibre and fine grasses. This followed a similar report by Carter (North, 1914) on a nest from the previous season, found in September at the paperbark swamps near Albany and located at a height of ten feet in tall scrub and "closely resembling those of the chestnut-eared finch" (Taeniopygia guttata castanotis, Australian zebra finch). While he did not make observations in the breeding season at Albany, he estimated the season to be from November to December and reported seeing fledglings being fed in January 1905 and 1909.

The construction of the nest varies in form, resembling a bottle or retort, spherical or globular, with a long and narrow entrance that often faces downward. The external size of this nest range from 160 to 195 mm in height, 120 to 104 mm in width, and a total length of 220 to 320 mm. The material used for construction of the nest is mostly fresh grass stems, clipped at the base and held vertically in the bill of the male for delivery to the female who builds the nest. At the peak of this activity, a male delivers one stem every 30 seconds. The interior is lined with feathers and other plant material and contains a two-part spherical breeding chamber—one chamber is a finer walled cup-shaped nest. The material utilised in the outer face is often wiry and fibrous and difficult to prise apart. The interior is generally made of soft and green grass. Examination of the elaborate nest construction indicates a significant investment of energy and time for a small bird. Four nests at the Wungong study site (Immelman, 1960) were found, aside from the lining, to contain 800 to over 1,000 pieces of material. The outer parts of each nest contained 400 to 550 pieces, stripped from twining fringe-lily (Thysanotis patersonii ), one measuring 89 cm with fine tendrils attached that were around 5–35 cm in length. The fringe-lily strips were 40–50 cm at the exterior of the structure and those in the tunnels became progressively shorter toward the interior—around 15–20 cm in length. Tunnels were made of 150 to 180 strips of the same material. The central nests were composed of 230 to 360 soft stems from grass species Stipa elegantissima, the maximum length at 20 cm and progressively shortening to 5 cm at the interior. The lining contained over 300 feathers from a western rosella (Platycercus icterotis) that had died in the vicinity, along with large amounts of downy plant material. This brought the total number of items delivered and assembled to over 2000.

A nest site was observed by Thomas Burns at Cape Riche in 1912 from which he collected four well-developed eggs on 28 September for an egg collector in New South Wales; these specimens were examined in North's Nests and Eggs of Birds Found Breeding in Australia and Tasmania (1901–14).

== Captivity ==
The red-eared firetail is regarded as an attractive but difficult bird in aviculture: they are rare and expensive, require permits that are restricted to specific research purposes, and remain mostly hidden in large and elaborate aviaries that simulate their habitat. There is no record of the species being held in an aviary before 1938, Cayley noted that absence from the literature in 1932. The first record of captives was published in the British Avicultural Magazine. The author, H. V. Highman of Perth, contracted a collector, who travelled two hundred kilometres, to trap and supply him with around twenty five birds. Highman maintained his personal collection of three pairs in a large aviary, measuring six by twenty four by twenty one metres, with living plants and several other bird species, including the beautiful firetail. A single specimen was sent to noted aviculturalist Simon Harvey in South Australia, though it did not survive long after. Highman reports that eight pairs were sent to Germany in 1933.

Mating pairs require their own aviary that is large enough to accommodate trees 2.5 metres tall. Aviaries that reproduce a suitable habitat with an understorey of grasses and shrubs beneath a canopy of trees (species Kunzea, Callistemon, Grevillea or Melaleuca) have been successful in accommodating breeding pairs. Rosemary Hutton densely planted aviaries with these trees and shrubs in her research, using pampas, Johnson and Geraldton grasses with clover and Phalaris species. Leaf litter was placed around plants to replicate the diversity and density of its native habitat. The breeding season can occur between July and January, during which the mating pairs aggression toward all other individuals intensifies. Males can be distinguished from females by careful observation of the deeper red of the coverts at the ear preceding the breeding period, or calls and behaviours at this time. The male initiates copulation by selecting a piece of grass, then a small flexible branch, to present to the partner, energetically bouncing with feathers fluffed up. The female reciprocates his display with the tail quivering while squatting. The arrangement of the nest and site is similar to those in its native environment. The seeds available from the plants of the aviary are supplemented with panicum, canary and millet. The birds forage for these and live insects in the foliage and floor of its artificial habitat.

The species has been bred in captivity since 1938; the first record was the discovery of young produced by caged specimens. The Western Australian aviculturalist, Alwyn Pepper, began a breeding program in 1962, using eggs obtained from a fallen nest in its native habitat. The clutch was incubated by Bengalese finches (Lonchura domestica) and a breeding pair were reared to successfully produce offspring within the first year. Pepper's work on this breeding program was acknowledged with an award from the Avicultural Society of Australia in 1986. Research into captive breeding was continued in Western Australia by Hutton. The Perth Zoo established a breeding program in the 1980s using four legally captured specimens to produce forty birds. A pair from the zoo's program were supplied to aviculturalist David Myers in New South Wales, producing four young in 1992. Some records of the species in aviaries outside Australia are anecdotal, reports stating they were seen in Belgium avaries and in other parts of Europe. In 1971 a group of twenty birds was sent to the University of Zurich, these had a low reproduction rate and eventually died of hepatitis. The species had only been available to aviculture in Australia when legally permitted, although restrictions were later relaxed. The red-eared firetail has never been legally imported into North America. The red-eared firetail is regarded as unsuitable for most aviculturalists except a finch specialist willing to dedicate resources for little return. This is a view long held by its breeders; this general advice was reiterated by Myers in 1987 and for twenty years thereafter. The species is comparatively expensive to purchase. The secretive habits and dense habitat required also make it unsuitable for exhibition at zoological gardens. No mutations have been reported in the captive population. As of 2011, state authority published statistics across several decades show that the species remains very rare in captivity. A national census by a finch association gave a total of 38 birds for 2011. Records of breeding in captivity are scarce. The few successful programs include those in New South Wales published by David Myers and the rearing of seven young from two pairs in a television feature on Burke's Backyard; other captive breeding is recorded in the states of Victoria and Western Australia.

Two specimens held at the National Museum of Victoria were acquired from a local aviculturalist in 1941.

== In popular culture ==
The Australian "Firetail" wine brand is named after this species.
