= Leioproctus brunneipilosus =

Scientific classification
- Kingdom: Animalia
- Phylum: Arthropoda
- Clade: Pancrustacea
- Class: Insecta
- Order: Hymenoptera
- Family: Colletidae
- Genus: Leioproctus
- Species: L. brunneipilosus

Binomial name
- Leioproctus brunneipilosus Batley, 2025

Species of bee

Leioproctus brunneipilosus, or Leioproctus (Euryglossidia) brunneipilosus, is a species of bee in the family Colletidae and subfamily Colletinae. It is endemic to Australia. It was described by entomologist Michael Batley in 2025.

== Etymology ==
The specific epithet brunneipilosus (Latin: "brown" + "hairy") is an anatomical reference to the tomentum on the female scutum.

== Description ==
The male body length is about 5.4 mm, female body length about 6.5 mm. Integumental colouration is mainly black and dark brown. The hair is white and orange-brown.

== Distribution and habitat ==
The species occurs in New South Wales. The type locality is Mount Colah.

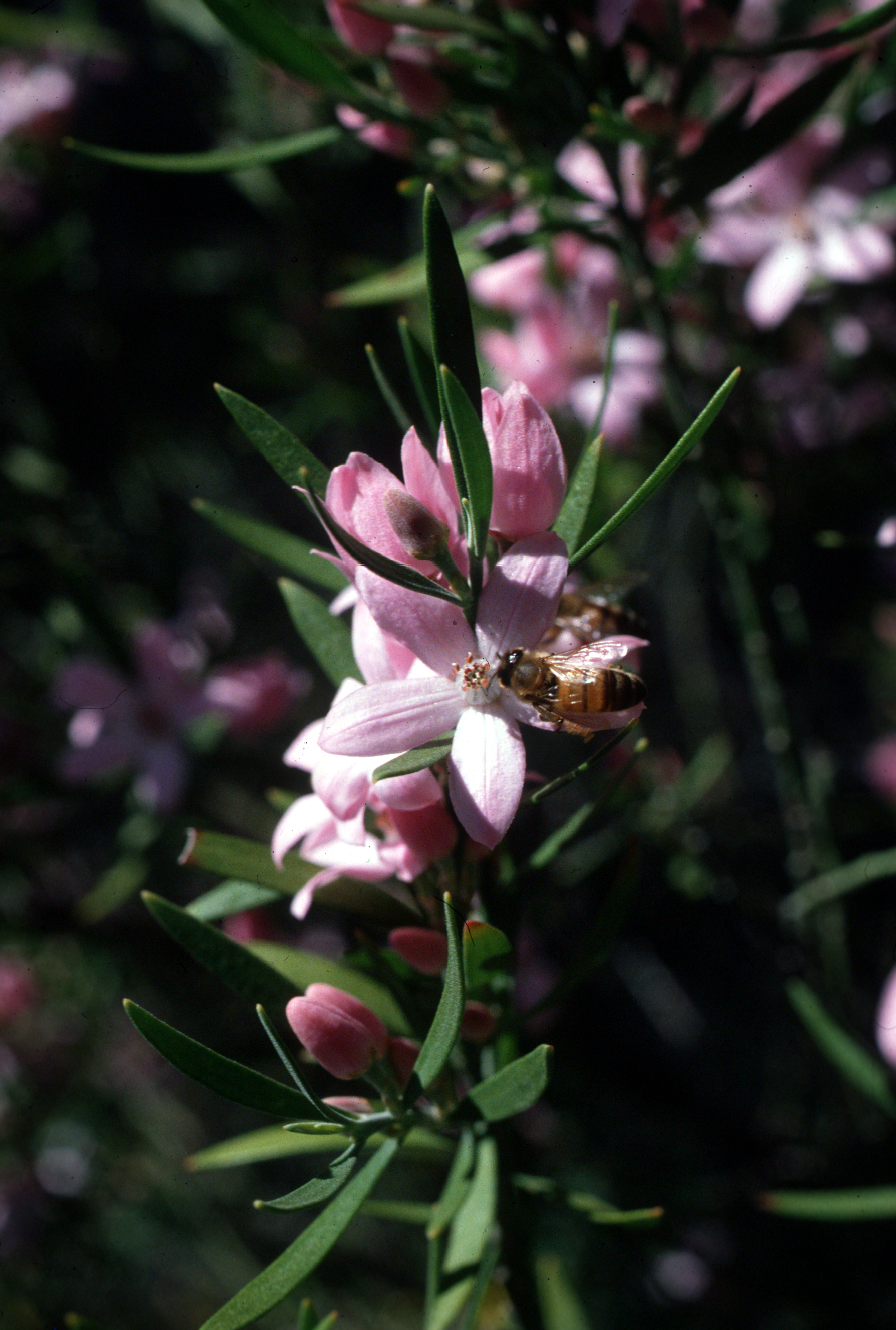
Flowers of Eriostemon australasius

== Behaviour ==
The adults are flying mellivores. Flowering plants visited by the bees include Grevillea buxifolia, Grevillea linearifolia, Boronia ledifolia, Boronia pinnata, Eriostemon australasius and Zieria laevigata.

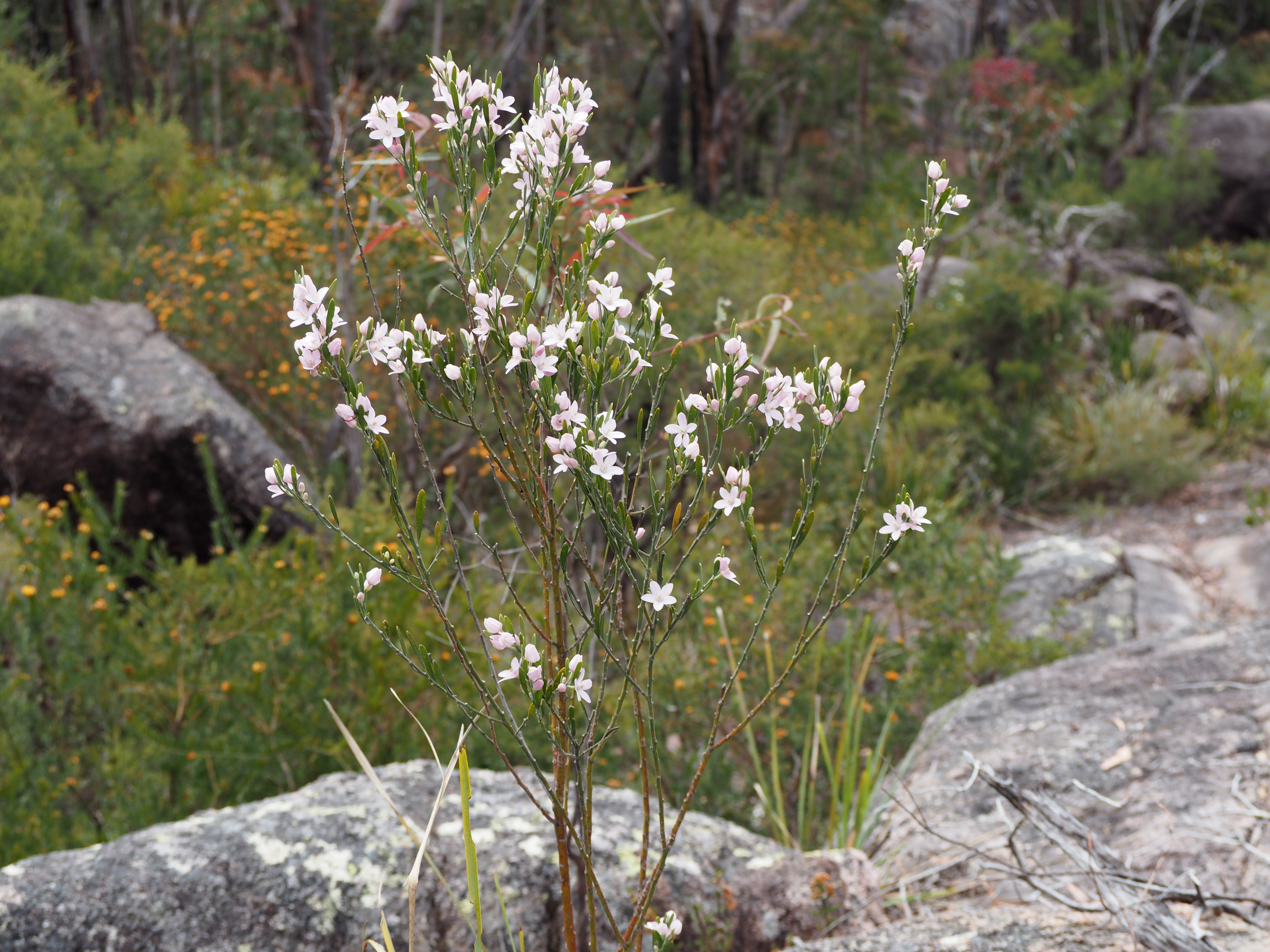
Eriostemon australasius (pink wax flower), a forage plant of the bees
