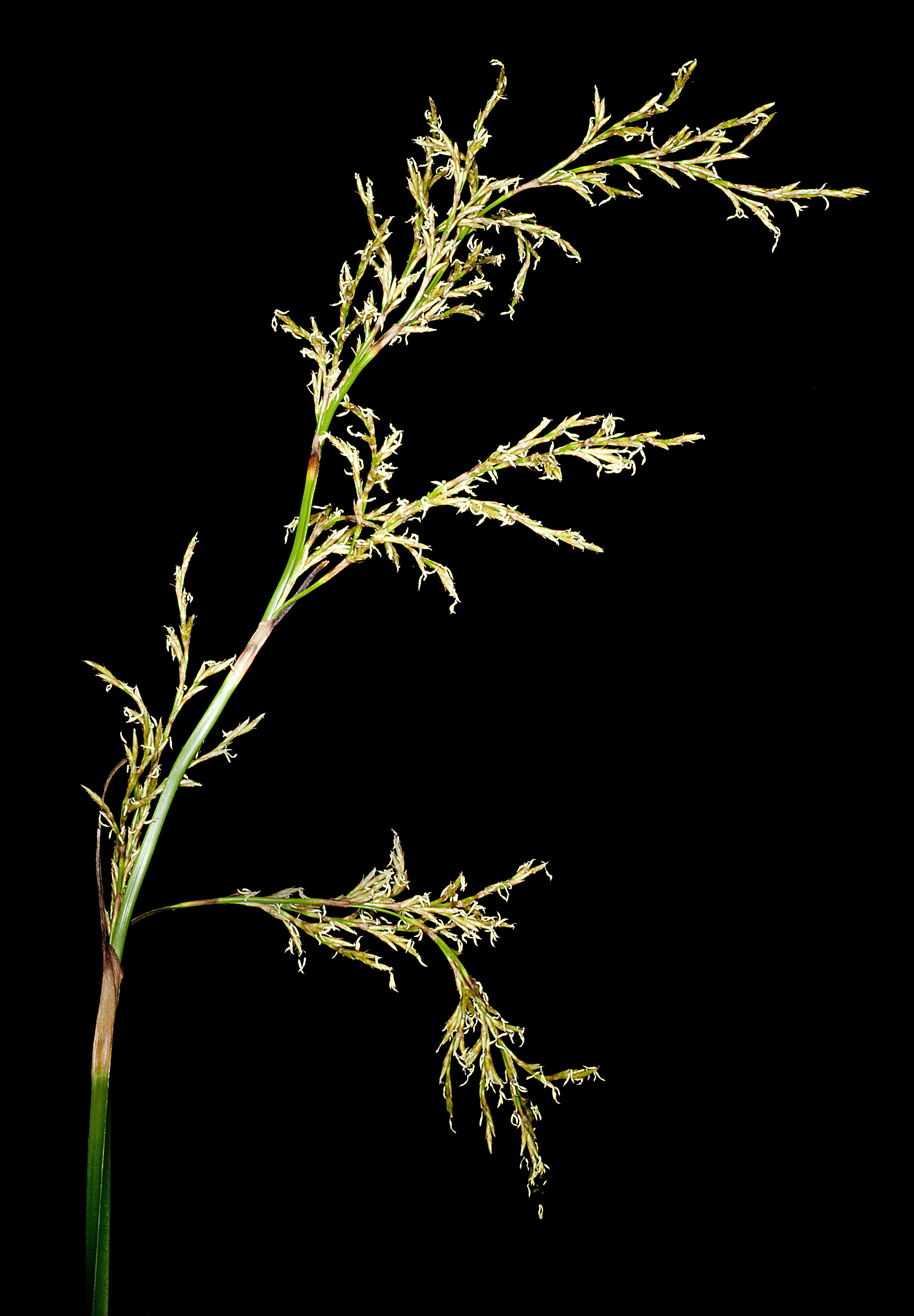

Scientific classification
- Kingdom: Plantae
- Clade: Tracheophytes
- Clade: Angiosperms
- Clade: Monocots
- Clade: Commelinids
- Order: Poales
- Family: Cyperaceae
- Genus: Lepidosperma
- Species: L. tetraquetrum

Binomial name
- Lepidosperma tetraquetrum Nees
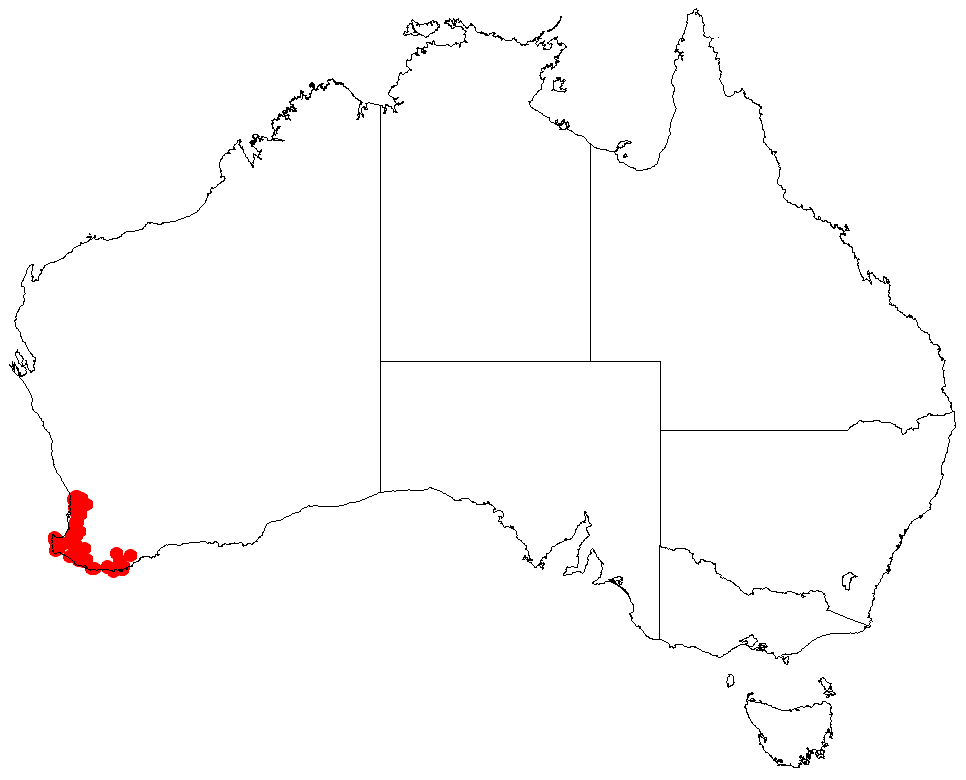
- Occurrence data from AVH

= Lepidosperma tetraquetrum =

Species of grass-like plant

Lepidosperma tetraquetrum is a sedge of the family Cyperaceae that is native to Southwest Australia.

The rhizomatous sedge typically grows to a height of two to three metres and with a spread of around two and a half metres wide. It is a tufted perennial with brownish inflorescence that appears sometime between November and December or January and March. In Western Australia it is found along the high rainfall southern coast, to the east of Albany on the Esperance Plains and north of Perth on the Swan Coastal Plain. Lepidosperma tetraquetrum occurs on sands with black peat near permanent water.

The first description was published by Christian Gottfried Daniel Nees von Esenbeck in the 1846 volume of Plantae Preissianae. L. tetraquetrum, according to its conservation status, is not considered to be threatened. The seed of the plant is favoured by red-eared firetails (Stagonopleura oculata), an endemic grass finch.
