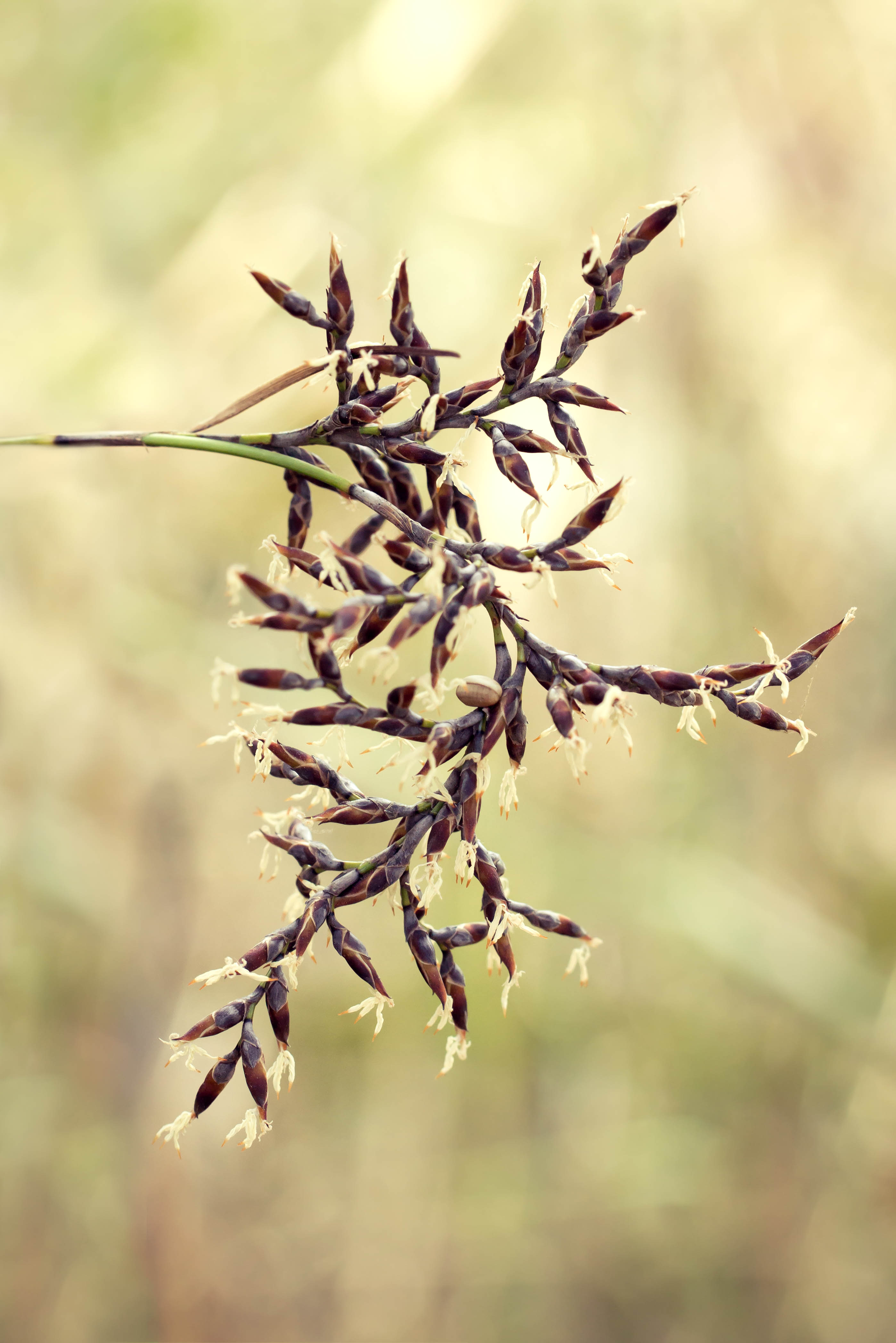

Scientific classification
- Kingdom: Plantae
- Clade: Tracheophytes
- Clade: Angiosperms
- Clade: Monocots
- Clade: Commelinids
- Order: Poales
- Family: Cyperaceae
- Genus: Lepidosperma
- Species: L. squamatum

Binomial name
- Lepidosperma squamatum Labill.
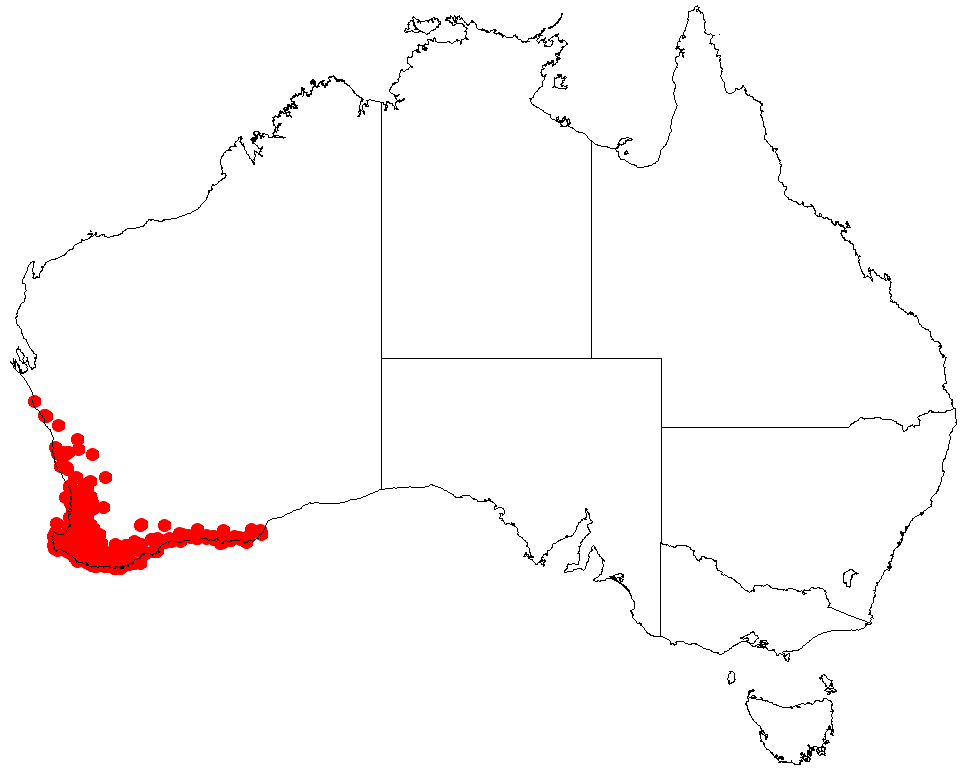
- Occurrence data from AVH

= Lepidosperma squamatum =

Species of plant

Lepidosperma squamatum is a species of flowering plant in the sedge family, Cyperaceae. It is native to Southwest Australia. It was described by Jacques Labillardière in Novae Hollandiae Plantarum Specimen (1805). The specific epithet squamatum is derived from the Latin for 'scale', in reference to the form of the bracts.

== Description ==
Lepidosperma squamatum is herbaceous and grows 0.15–1 metre (0.49–3.28 ft) in height. It is a tufted perennial, also growing rhizomatously. Its brownish inflorescence appears between March and November.

== Distribution and habitat ==
In Western Australia it is found along the high rainfall southwest coast to the east edge of the Esperance Plains and northern tip of the Geraldton Sandplains regions of the Southwest Australia botanic province. Lepidosperma squamatum occurs in dunes and swamps over gravel, sandy clay, or calceritic, lateritic or peaty sand.

L. squamatum, according to its conservation status, is not considered to be threatened.

== Ecology ==
The seed of the plant is favoured by red-eared firetails (Stagonopleura oculata), an endemic grass finch.
