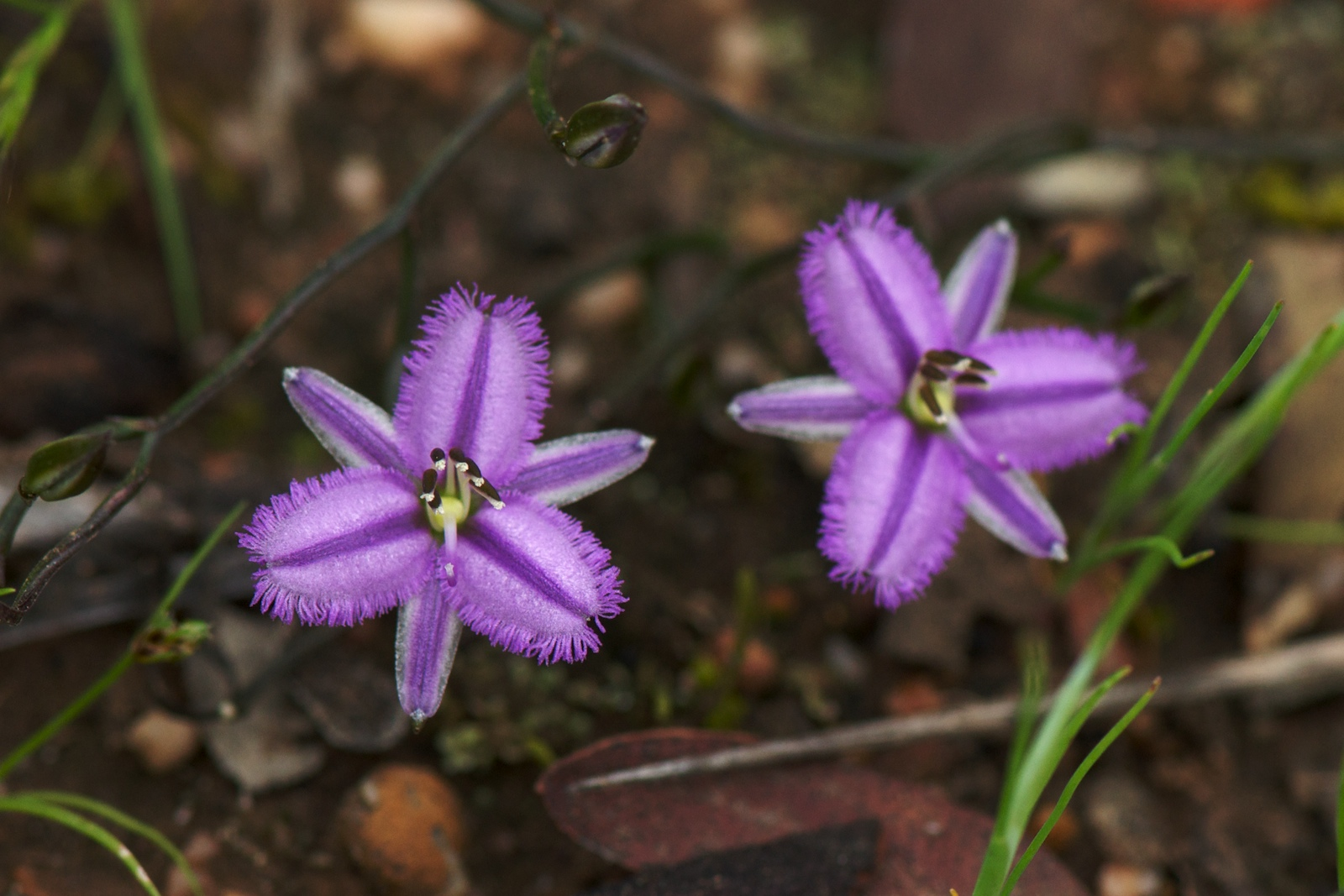

Scientific classification
- Kingdom: Plantae
- Clade: Tracheophytes
- Clade: Angiosperms
- Clade: Monocots
- Order: Asparagales
- Family: Asparagaceae
- Subfamily: Lomandroideae
- Genus: Thysanotus
- Species: T. patersonii

Binomial name
- Thysanotus patersonii R.Br.

Synonyms
- Chlamysporum menziesii (R.Br.) Kuntze; Thysanotus menziesii R.Br.; Thysanotus patersoni R.Br. orth. var.; Thysanotus patersonii R.Br. subsp. patersonii; Thysanotus patersonii var. exfimbriatus J.M.Black nom. inval. p.p.

= Thysanotus patersonii =

Twining fringe-lily

Species of plant

Thysanotus patersonii, commonly known as twining fringe-lily or Paterson's fringed lily, is a species of flowering plant in the Asparagaceae family, and is endemic to Australia. It is a leafless, twining perennial herb, with tuberous roots, purple flowers borne singly or in sparse panicles with linear to lance-shaped sepals, elliptic, fringed petals and six stamens.

== Description ==
Thysanotus patersonii is a leafless, twining perennial herb with tuberous roots, the tubers about 2–5 cm (0.79–1.97 in) long. There is usually a single stem 10–100 cm (3.9–39.4 in) long, terete and hairy at the base, square in cross section and glabrous above, and twining around vegetation or prostrate, usually with many branches up to 15–50 cm (5.9–19.7 in) long. The flowers are usually borne singly on branches on a pedicel 1–2 mm (0.039–0.079 in) long. The perianth segments are about 8–10.5 mm (0.31–0.41 in) long, the sepals linear to lance-shaped, 2–3 mm (0.079–0.118 in) wide and the petals elliptic, 4–6 mm (0.16–0.24 in) wide with a fringe 0.5–1 mm (0.020–0.039 in) long. There are six stamens, the anthers all equally 2–6 mm (0.079–0.236 in) long and straight to slightly curved and the style is straight to curved, 3–4 mm (0.12–0.16 in) long. Flowering occurs between July and November, and the seeds are more or less spherical, about 1 mm (0.039 in) in diameter with a straw-coloured aril.

== Taxonomy ==
Thysanotus patersonii was first formally described in 1810 by the botanist Robert Brown in his Prodromus Florae Novae Hollandiae et Insulae Van Diemen. The specific epithet (patersonii) honours William Paterson.

== Distribution and habitat ==
Twining fringe-lily occurs in all Australian states and the Australian Capital Territory but not in Queensland or the Northern Territory. It grows in a wide variety of habitats apart from tall forest and wet or saline communities. In Western Australia it is widespread in the south-west, and in South Australia it is especially common in the south-east of that state. In New South Wales and the Australian Capital Territory it is widespread, mainly in inland districts west from the Braidwood, Bathurst and Warrumbungle areas and it is widespread and locally common throughout Victoria apart from the far east of the state.

== Ecology ==
Strips of this plant are used by the red-eared firetail Stagonopleura oculata, a small bird in Southwest Australia, in the construction of their elaborate nests.

== Use in horticulture ==
The plant is used in urban landscapes and gardens, especially as a rockery specimen. It is grown from seed, favouring full sun and free drainage, and will trail out from rocks or loosely spiral up on neighbouring plants. Flowers are prolific and appear over spring and summer.
