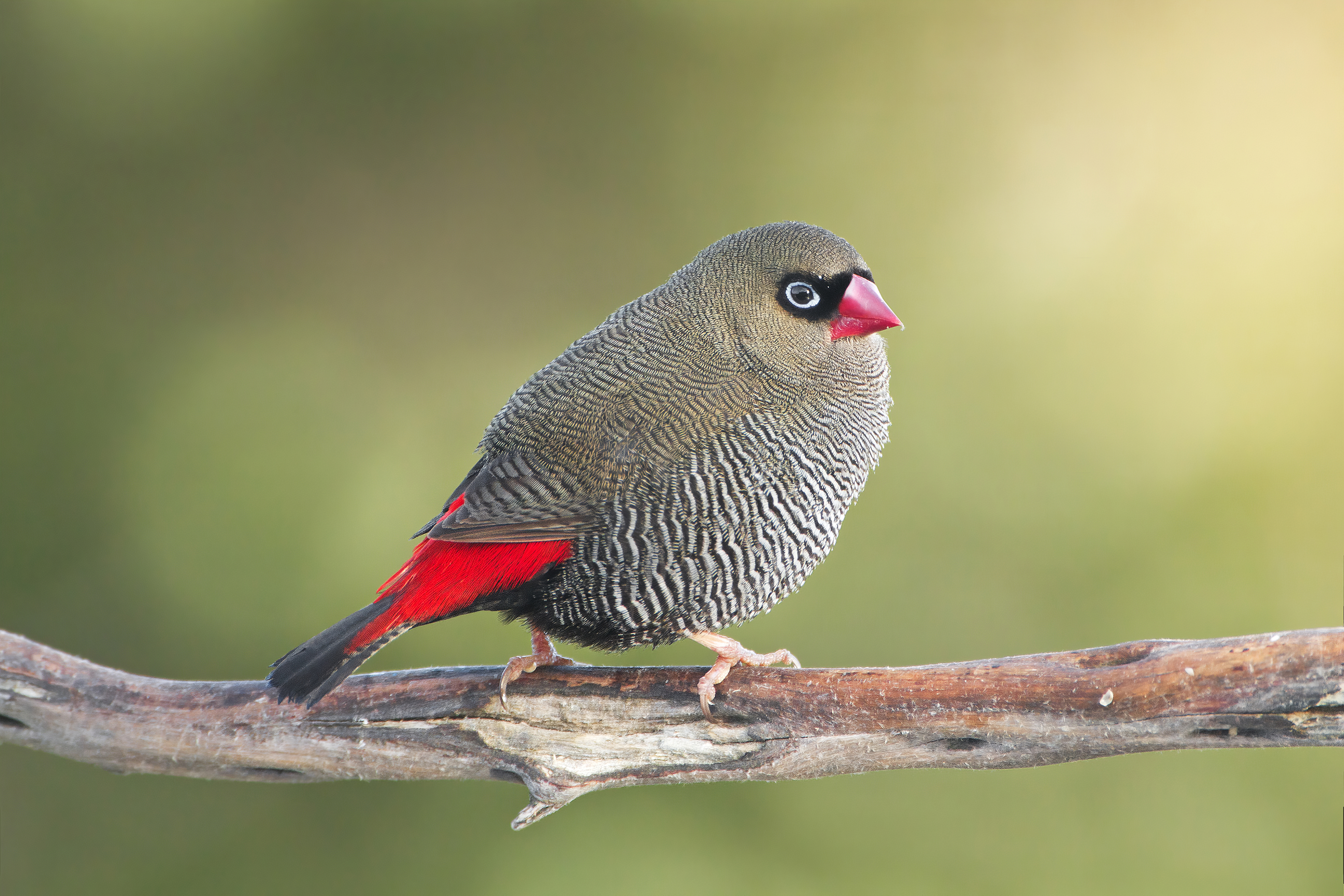
- Beautiful firetail (Stagonopleura bella)

Scientific classification
- Domain: Eukaryota
- Kingdom: Animalia
- Phylum: Chordata
- Class: Aves
- Order: Passeriformes
- Family: Estrildidae
- Genus: Stagonopleura; Reichenbach, 1850

Type species
- Loxia guttata diamond firetail Shaw, 1796

Species
- S. bella S. oculata S. guttata

= Stagonopleura =

Genus of birds

Stagonopleura is a genus of small seed-eating birds in the family Estrildidae that are native to Australia.

The species are similar in appearance, with short red bills, brown upperparts, red rumps and uppertail coverts, and barred or spotted underparts. The informal name of firetails refers to the rich crimson colour at the rump, a prominent characteristic of the genus.

== Taxonomy ==
The genus Stagonopleura was introduced by the German naturalist Ludwig Reichenbach in 1850. The genus name combines the Ancient Greek stagōn meaning "spot" with pleura meaning "side" or "flank". The type species was designated as the diamond firetail in 1851 by Jean Cabanis.

=== Species ===
The three species in the genus are:

Genus Stagonopleura – Reichenbach, 1850 – three species
Common name	Scientific name and subspecies	Range	Size and ecology	IUCN status and estimated population
Diamond firetail Male Female	Stagonopleura guttata (Shaw, 1796)	Eastern Australia from the Eyre Peninsula, South Australia, to south-eastern Queensland, often on the slopes of the Great Dividing Range	Size: Habitat: Diet:	VU
Beautiful firetail Male Female	Stagonopleura bella (Latham, 1801)	Southeast of Australia; Tasmania	Size: Habitat: Diet:	LC
Red-eared firetail	Stagonopleura oculata (Quoy & Gaimard, 1832)	Southwest Australia	Size: Habitat: Diet:	LC
