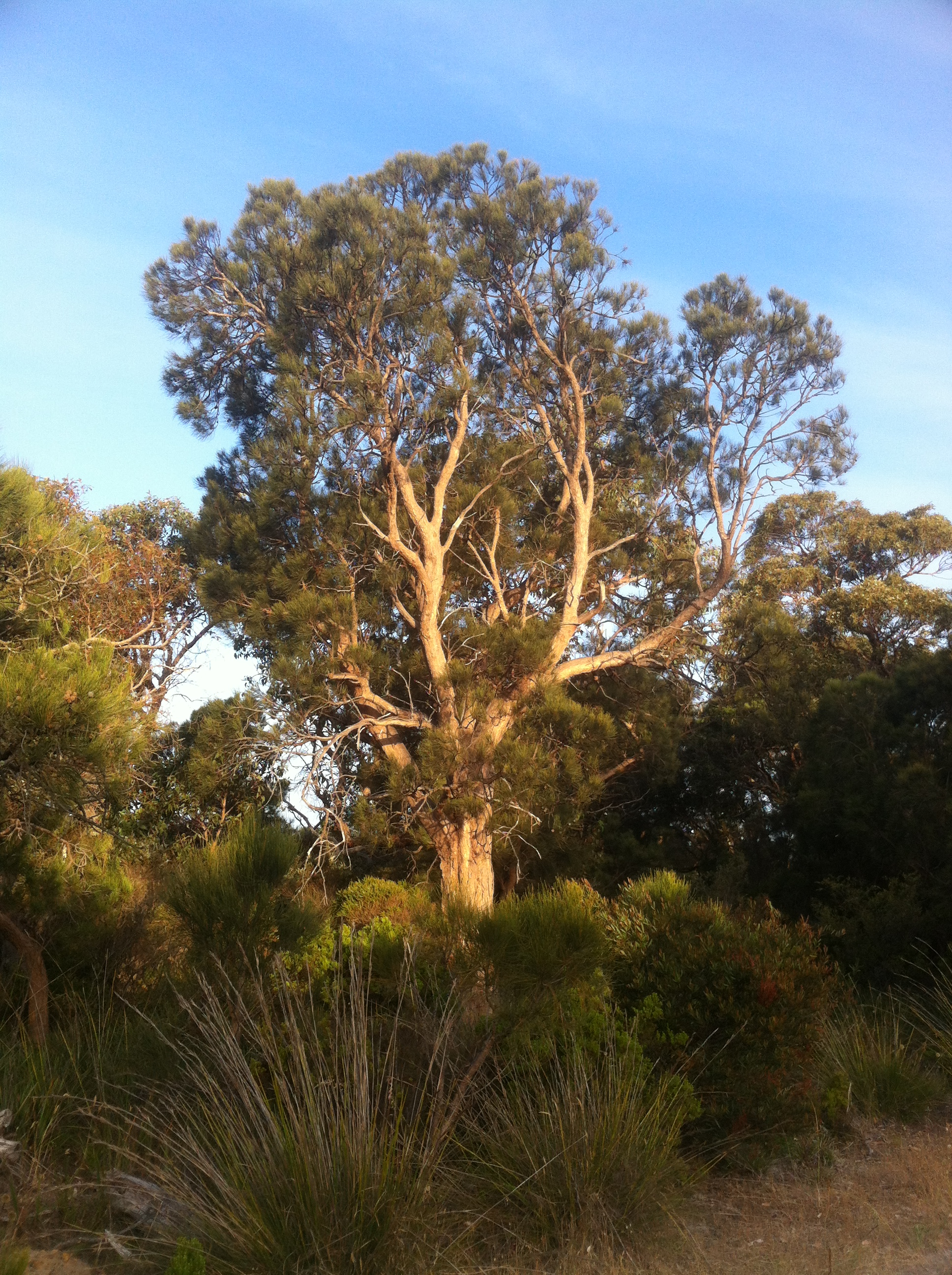
- In Albany

Conservation status
- Least Concern (IUCN 3.1)

Scientific classification
- Kingdom: Plantae
- Clade: Tracheophytes
- Clade: Angiosperms
- Clade: Eudicots
- Clade: Rosids
- Order: Fagales
- Family: Casuarinaceae
- Genus: Allocasuarina
- Species: A. fraseriana

Binomial name
- Allocasuarina fraseriana (Miq.) L.A.S.Johnson
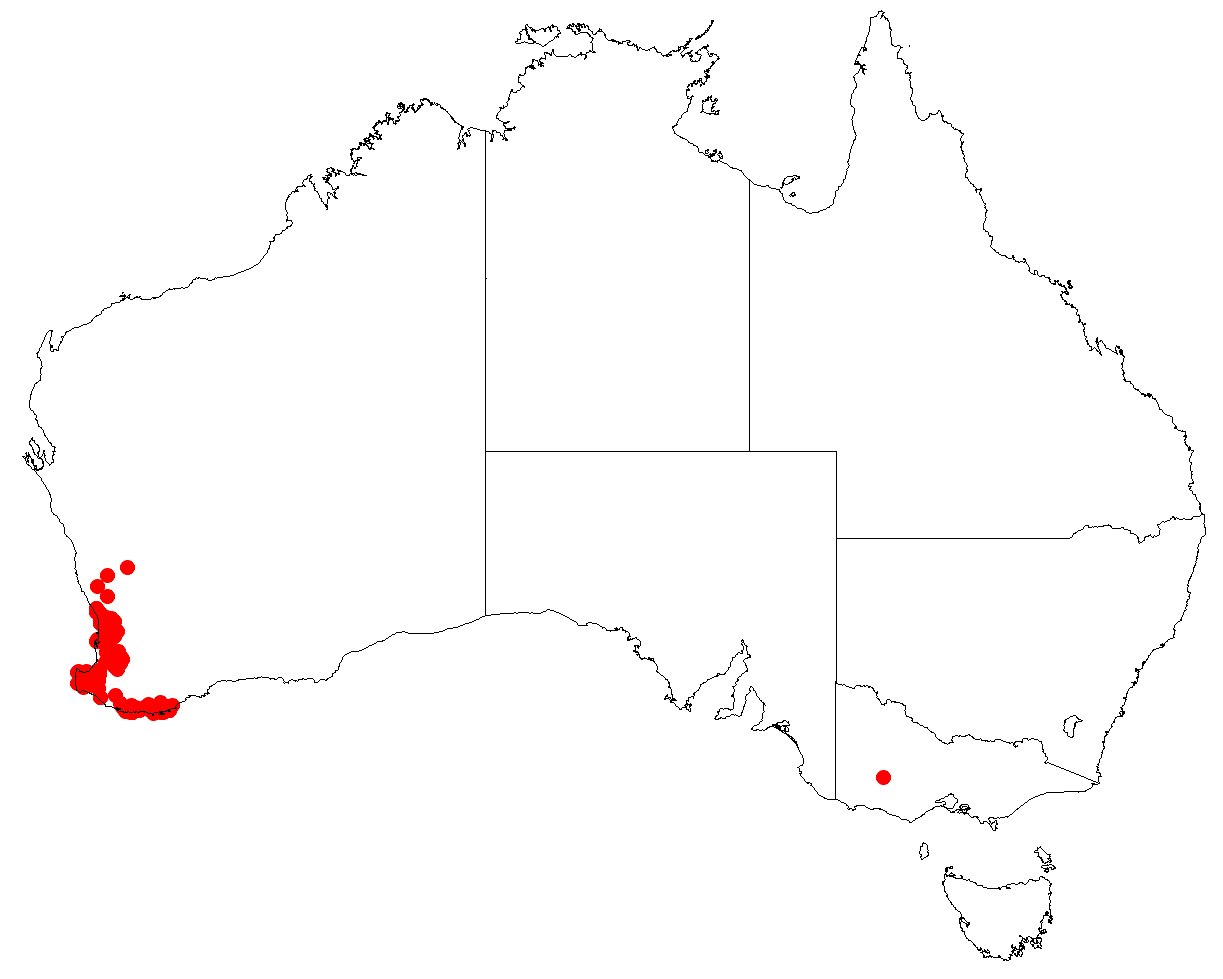
- Occurrence data from AVH

= Allocasuarina fraseriana =

Species of tree

Allocasuarina fraseriana, commonly known as western sheoak, or Fraser's sheoak is a species of flowering plant in the family Casuarinaceae, and is endemic to the south-west of Western Australia. The Noongar peoples know the tree as kondil, condil, kulli or gulli. It is a monoecious tree that has branchlets up to 300 mm (12 in) long, the leaves reduced to scales in whorls of six to eight, and the mature fruiting cones 15–40 mm (0.6–2 in) long, containing winged seeds (samaras) 10 mm (0.4 in) long.

== Description ==
Allocasuarina fraseriana is a monoecious tree that typically grows to a height of 5–15 m (16–49 ft), the trunk with a dbh of 0.5–1 m (1 ft 8 in – 3 ft 3 in). Its branchlets are more or less erect, up to 300 mm (12 in) long, the leaves reduced to spreading, scale-like teeth 0.7–1.2 mm (0.03–0.05 in) long, arranged in whorls of six to eight around the branchlets. The sections of branchlet between the leaf whorls (the "articles") are 7–15 mm (0.3–0.6 in) long and 0.8–1.3 mm (0.03–0.05 in) in diameter. Male flowers are arranged in spikes 30–80 mm (1.2–3.1 in) long, the anthers 0.7–1.2 mm (0.03–0.05 in) long. Female cones are shortly cylindrical and covered with soft hair when young, the mature cones 15–40 mm (0.6–2 in) long and 15–22 mm (0.6–0.9 in) in diameter, the samaras 10 mm (0.4 in) long. Flowering occurs from May to October.

== Taxonomy ==
This species of sheoak was first formally described in 1848 by Friedrich Anton Wilhelm Miquel, who gave it the name Casuarina fraseriana in Revisio critica Casuarinarum. It was reclassified in 1982 as Allocasuarina fraseriana by Lawrie Johnson in the Journal of the Adelaide Botanic Gardens. The specific name fraseriana honours the botanist Charles Fraser.

== Distribution and habitat ==
Allocasuarina fraseriana grows in jarrah woodland and open forest in near-coastal regions between Perth and Albany, with a disjunct population between Moora and Jurien Bay, in the Jarrah Forest, Swan Coastal Plain and Warren bioregions of south-west Western Australia.

== Conservation status ==
Western sheoak is listed as "not threatened" by the Western Australian Government Department of Biodiversity, Conservation and Attractions.

== Ecology ==
The seed of the plant is favoured by red-eared firetails (Stagonopleura oculata), an endemic grass finch.

== Uses ==
=== Indigenous uses ===
Noongar women traditionally gave birth beneath the tree, because of the soft needles. The needles were also used for bedding in shelters and often covered with a kangaroo skin cloak to make a bed. The wood was used to make boomerangs.

=== Construction ===
Early settlers of Western Australia used sheoak timber for roof shingles. Later it was used in the construction of kegs and casks. Today, the timber is prized for its broad medullary rays, and is often used for wood-turning and carving of decorative ornaments. The sapwood is a pale yellow colour and the heartwood is dark-red to brown. The texture is moderately fine and even. Green wood has a density of about 1,000 kg/m^{3} (1,700 lb/cu yd), and that of air-dried wood is about 730 kg/m^{3} (1,230 lb/cu yd).

== Gallery ==
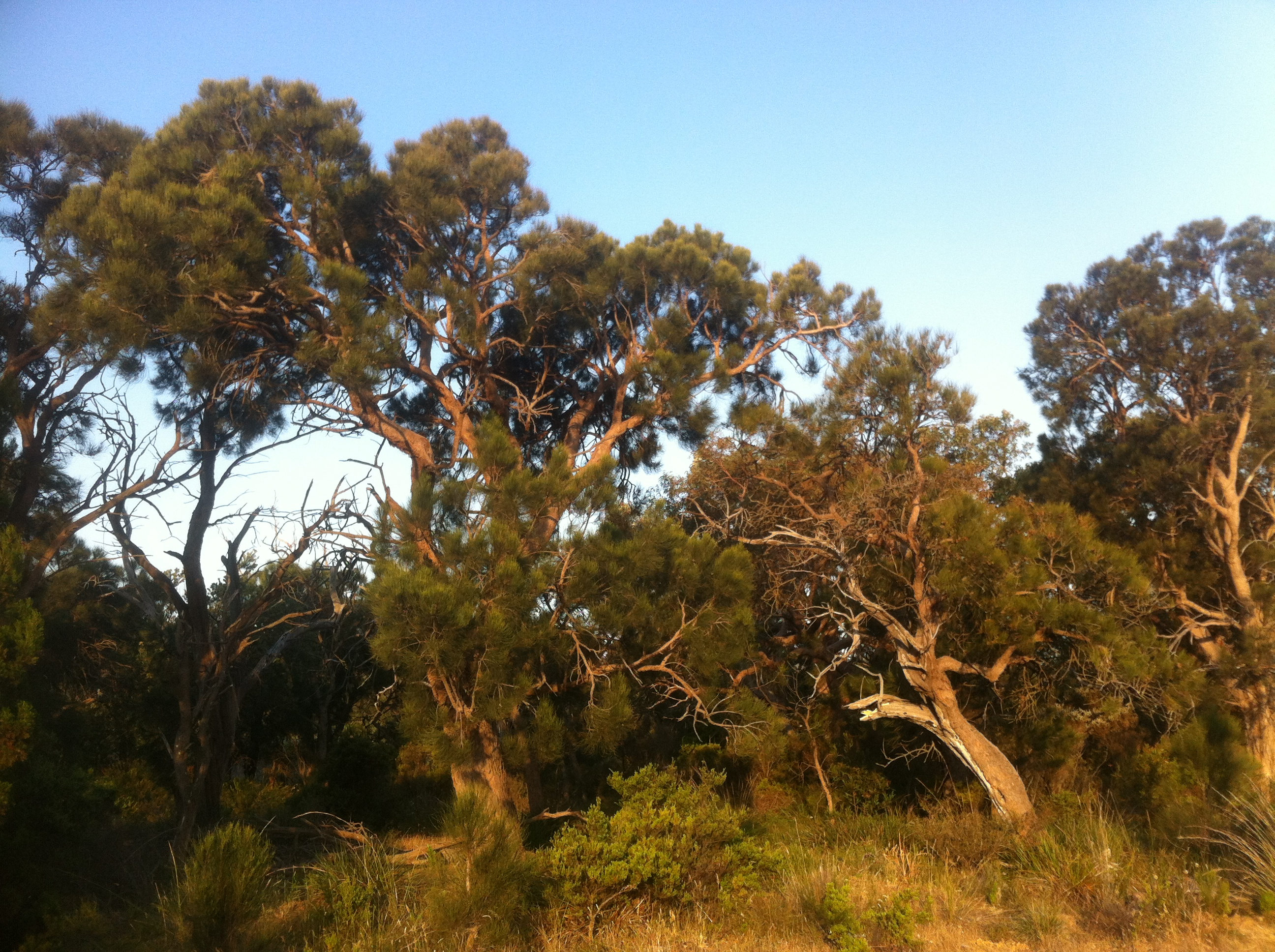
Allocasuarina fraseriana woodland in Albany

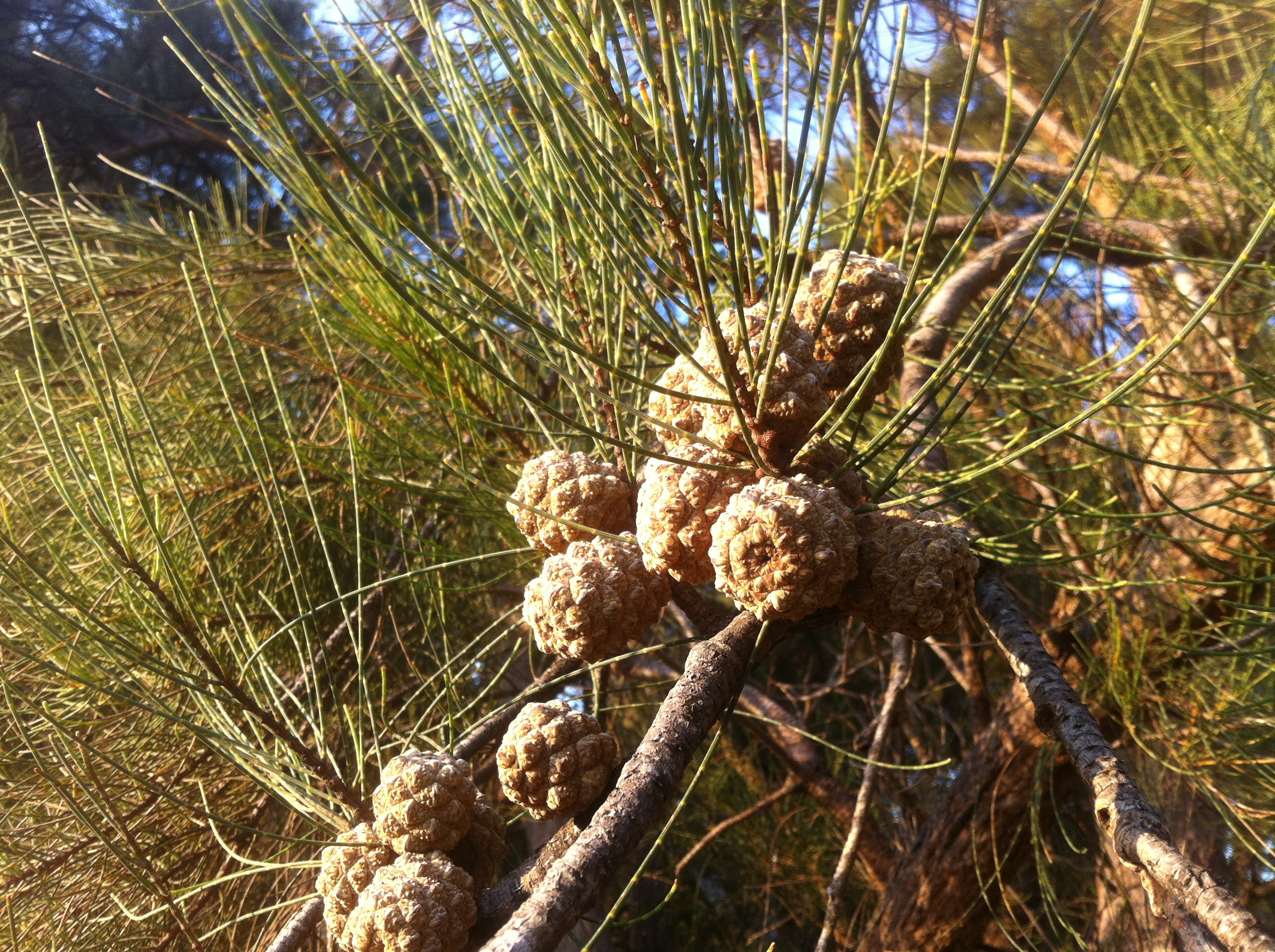
Fruit

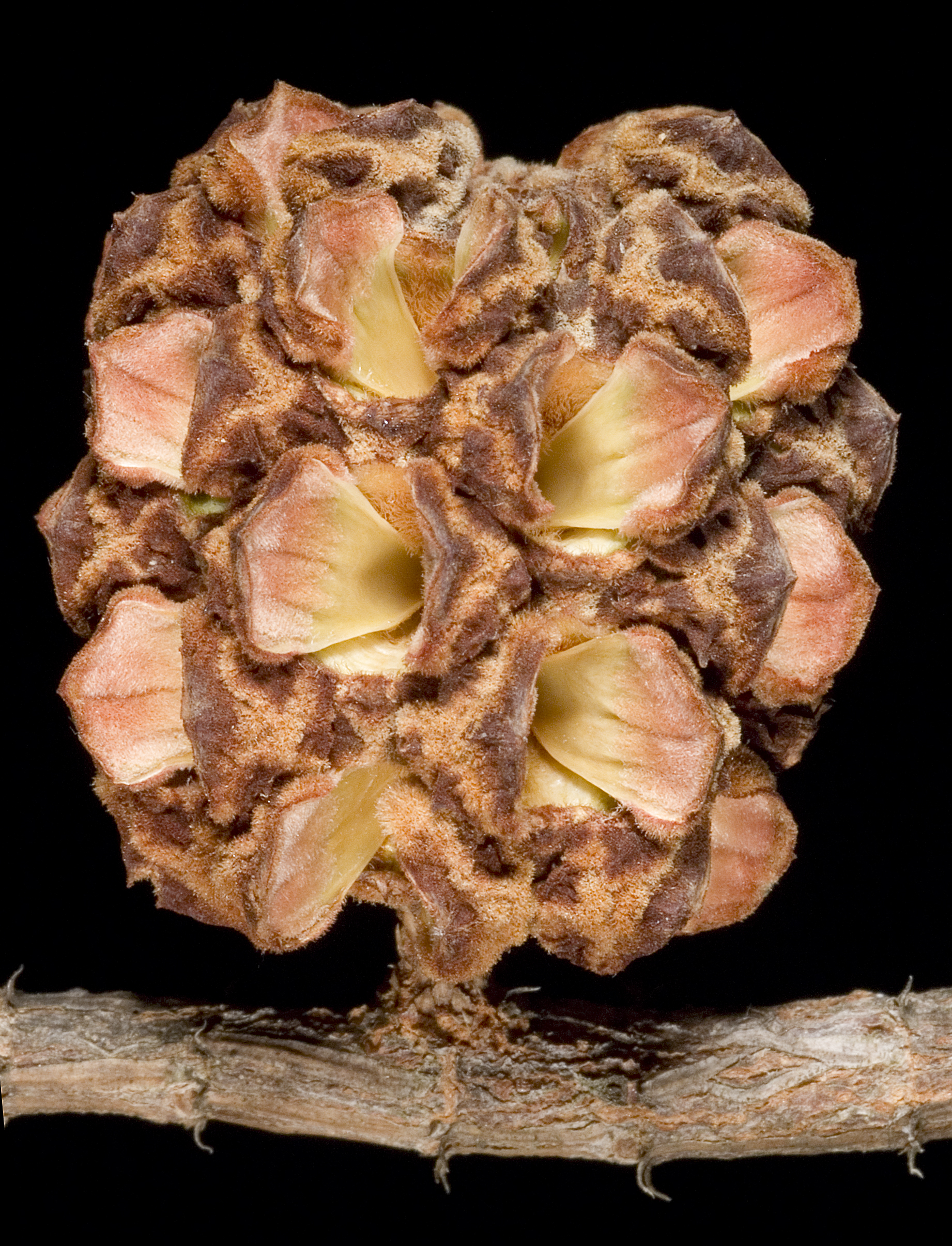
Fruit (detail)
