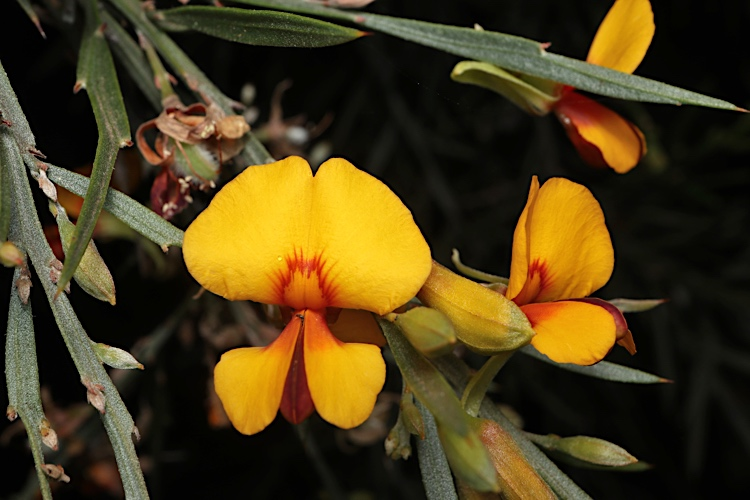
- In Leeuwin-Naturaliste National Park

Scientific classification
- Kingdom: Plantae
- Clade: Tracheophytes
- Clade: Angiosperms
- Clade: Eudicots
- Clade: Rosids
- Order: Fabales
- Family: Fabaceae
- Subfamily: Faboideae
- Genus: Jacksonia
- Species: J. horrida

Binomial name
- Jacksonia horrida DC.

Synonyms
- Acksonia mollissima W.Fitzg. orth. var.; Jacksonia horrida DC. var. horrida; Jacksonia mollissima W.Fitzg.; Jacksonia sp. Busselton (G.J.Keighery 4482); Jacksonia sparsa Chappill ms.; Piptomeris horrida (DC.) Greene

= Jacksonia horrida =

Species of legume

Jacksonia horrida is a species of flowering plant in the family Fabaceae and is endemic to the south-west of Western Australia. It is an erect or spreading to prostrate, bushy shrub with greyish-green branches ending in short, flattened, sharply-pointed side branches, the leaves reduced to scales and the flowers scattered and yellow-orange with red markings.

== Description ==
Jacksonia horrida is an erect or spreading to prostrate, bushy shrub that typically grows up to 0.1–4 m (3.9 in – 13 ft 1.5 in) high and 0.8–1.1 m (2 ft 7 in – 3 ft 7 in) wide. The branches are greyish-green, ending in short, flattened, sharply-pointed side branches 5–43 mm (0.20–1.69 in) long and 1.5–4 mm (0.059–0.157 in) wide. The penultimate branches are densely hairy. The leaves are reduced to broadly egg-shaped scale-leaves 0.7–1.7 mm (0.028–0.067 in) long and 0.5–1.6 mm (0.020–0.063 in) wide. The flowers are scattered on the branches with scale leaves at the base on a pedicel 4–7.5 mm (0.16–0.30 in) long, with egg-shaped bracteoles that fall off as the flowers open. The floral tube is 0.9–1.4 mm (0.035–0.055 in) long and the sepals are membranous, 8.0–9.7 mm (0.31–0.38 in) long and 1.5–1.8 mm (0.059–0.071 in) wide. The standard petal is yellow-orange with red markings, 8.4–8.6 mm (0.33–0.34 in) long and 11–12 mm (0.43–0.47 in) deep, the wings yellow-orange with red markings, 8.3–8.6 mm (0.33–0.34 in) long and 3.3–4.1 mm (0.13–0.16 in) deep, and the keel is red, 7.9–8.0 mm (0.31–0.31 in) long. The stamens have pink filaments 5.2–9.7 mm (0.20–0.38 in) long. Flowering occurs from throughout the year, and the fruit is a woody, densely hairy pod 6.5–11.3 mm (0.26–0.44 in) long and 2.8–4.7 mm (0.11–0.19 in) wide.

== Taxonomy ==
Jacksonia horrida was first formally described in 1825 by Augustin Pyramus de Candolle in his Prodromus Systematis Naturalis Regni Vegetabilis. The specific epithet (horrida) means 'prickly' or 'very rough'.

== Distribution and habitat ==
This species of Jacksonia grows in shrubland or woodland, often in winter-wet areas or on coastal dunes, between Lake Clifton and West Cape Howe in the Esperance Plains, Jarrah Forest, Swan Coastal Plain and Warren bioregion of south-western Western Australia.
