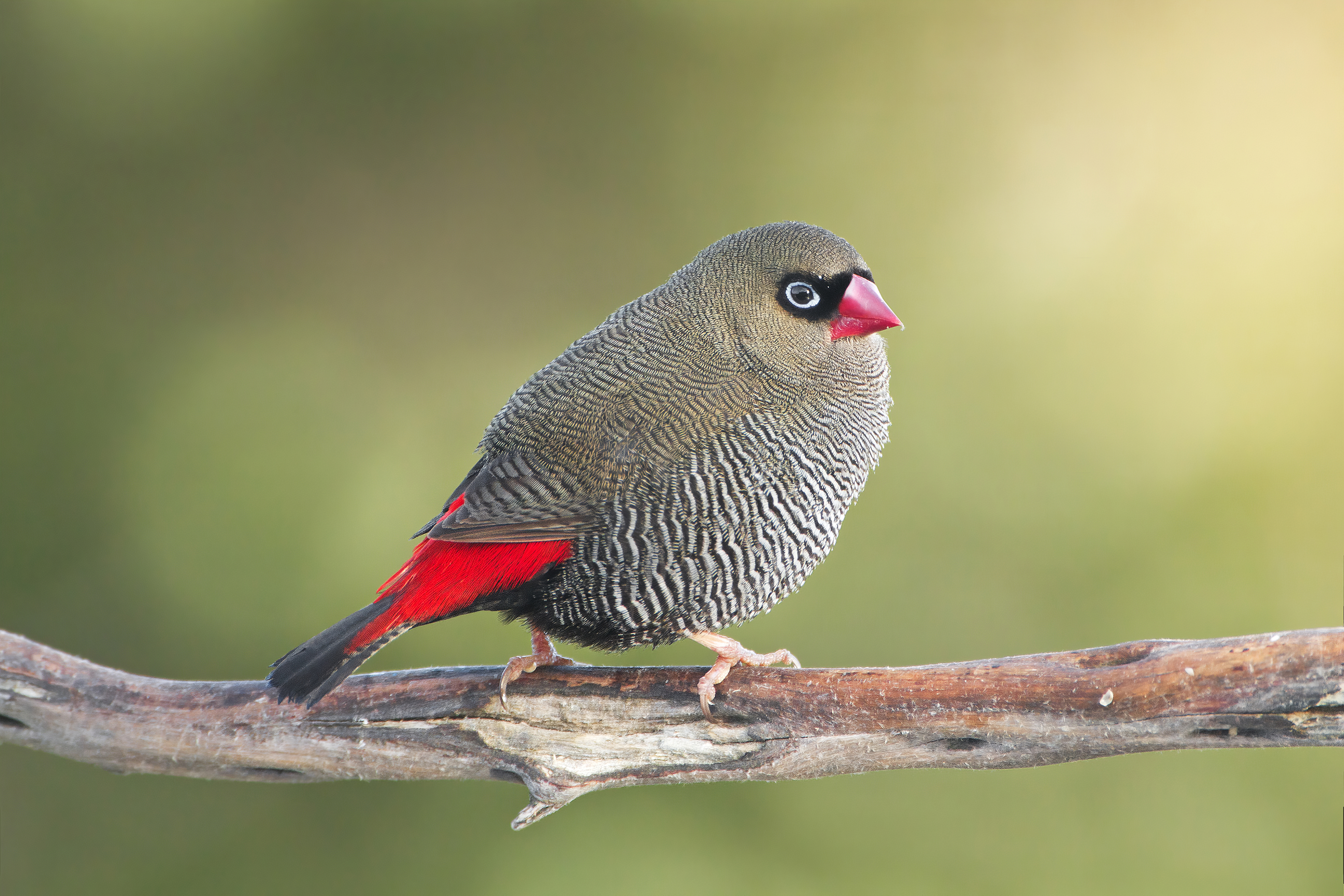
- male
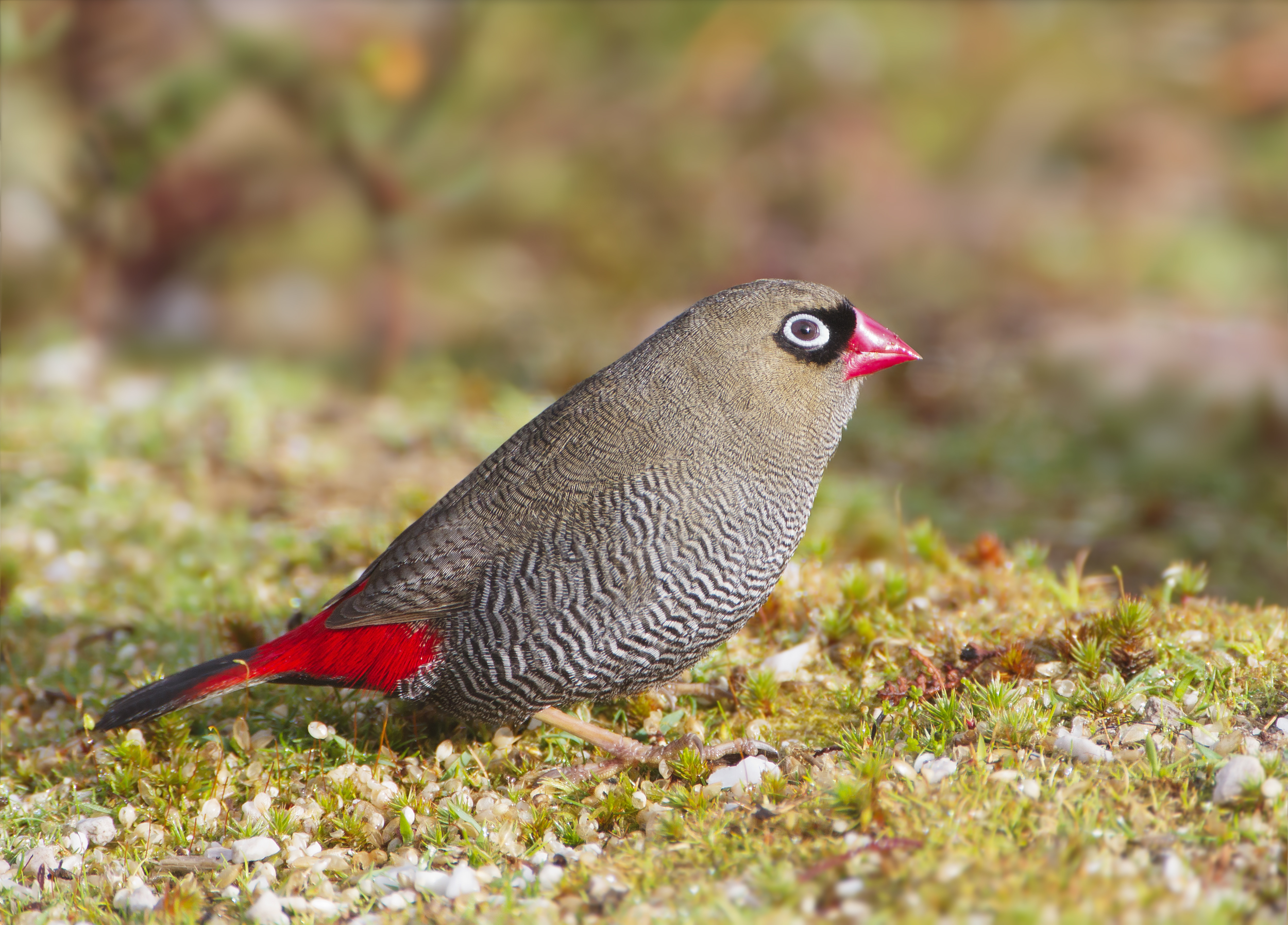
- female

Conservation status
- Least Concern (IUCN 3.1)

Scientific classification
- Kingdom: Animalia
- Phylum: Chordata
- Class: Aves
- Order: Passeriformes
- Family: Estrildidae
- Genus: Stagonopleura
- Species: S. bella

Binomial name
- Stagonopleura bella (Latham, 1801)
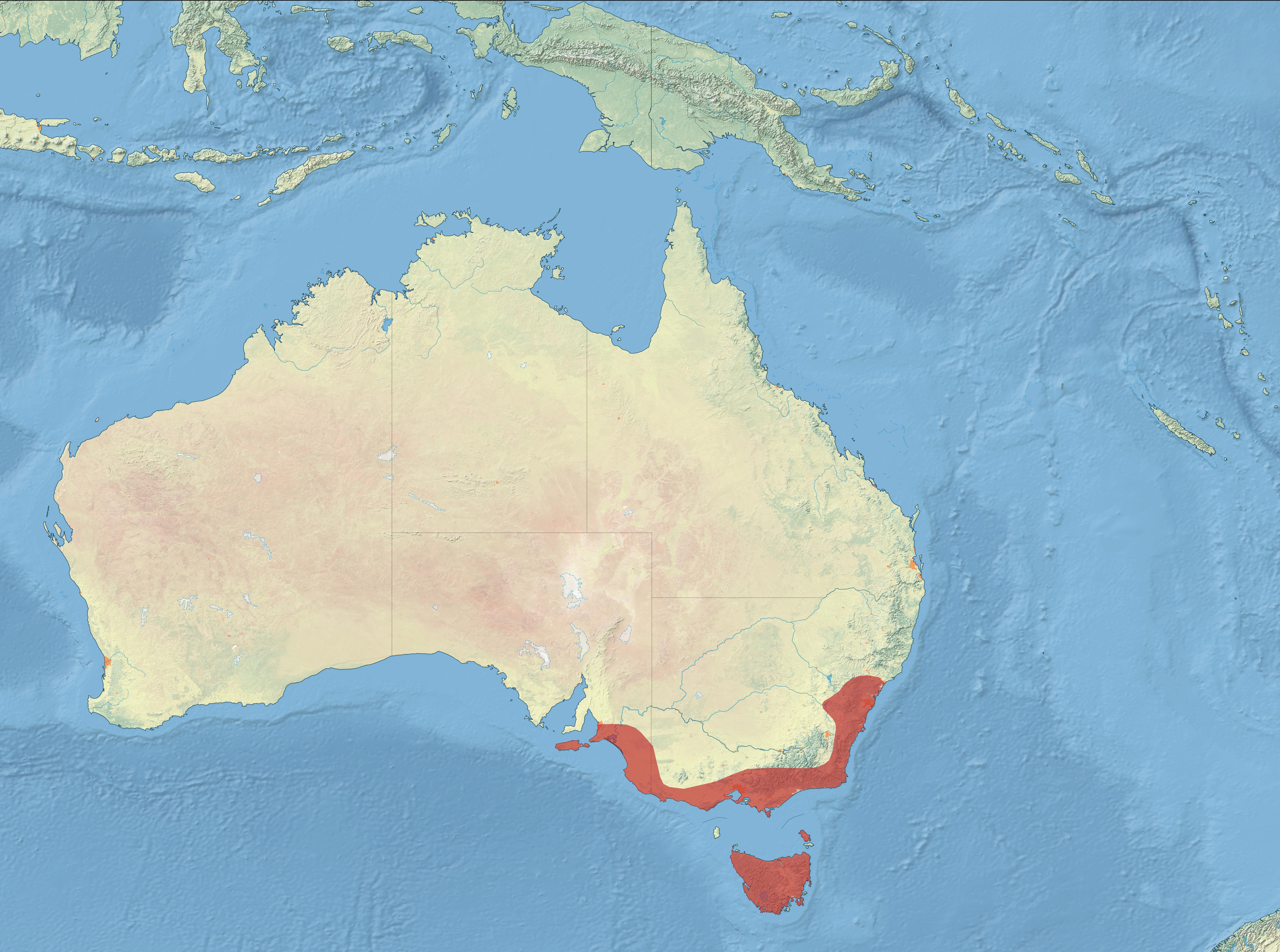
- distribution

= Beautiful firetail =

Species of bird

The beautiful firetail (Stagonopleura bella) is a common species of estrildid finch found in Australia. It has an estimated global extent of occurrence of 1,000,000 km^{2} (390,000 sq mi). The species inhabits temperate shrubland habitats in Australia. The IUCN has classified the species as being of least concern.

== Description ==
At 10 to 13 cm (3.9 to 5.1 in) long and weighing 14 g (1/2 oz) the beautiful firetail is a small plump bird, slightly smaller than the diamond firetail. Its plumage is mostly olive-brown. The white chest has a fine pattern of dark lines. The head has a black mask with pale blue rings around the eyes and a thick red beak. Its rump is a deep red, its legs and feet are creamy pink. The wings and tail are short and rounded. Juvenile birds are less colourful with a smaller face mask and a blackish beak. The male has a black abdomen.

== Distribution and habitat ==
The beautiful firetail is endemic to Southeastern Australia. Its distribution range extends from Newcastle to Kangaroo Island, however, the bird is most prolific in Tasmania and off-shore islands. It lives in coastal heathland, forests and shrubbery, never far from water. Its preference for near water habitats was shown in a study of its occurrence in intact forest areas of the Victorian Central Highlands, where it was almost exclusively found in riparian habitat.

The beautiful firetail is considered a resident bird, keeping close to home.

== Behaviour ==
The beautiful firetail mainly feeds on grass seed and Casuarina and Melaleuca seeds. It can also be found in association with Banksia ericifolia heathland in coastal New South Wales. Small insects and snails occasionally complement this herbivore diet. The birds are usually found in pairs or forming small groups of up to 20 individuals.

== Reproduction ==
In the breeding season lasting from October to January, the beautiful firetail nests in dense foliage near the ground. The nest is made of grass and thin twigs, its insides are covered in feathers. It is bottle-shaped with a long tunnel-like entrance on one side leading to a spherical nesting chamber.

Both parents build the nest together, brood the five to eight egg clutch for about 20 days, and feed the hatched chicks, which leave the nest after about another 20 days. After another four weeks the chicks are left to their own devices and reach sexual maturity at about nine to twelve months of age.
