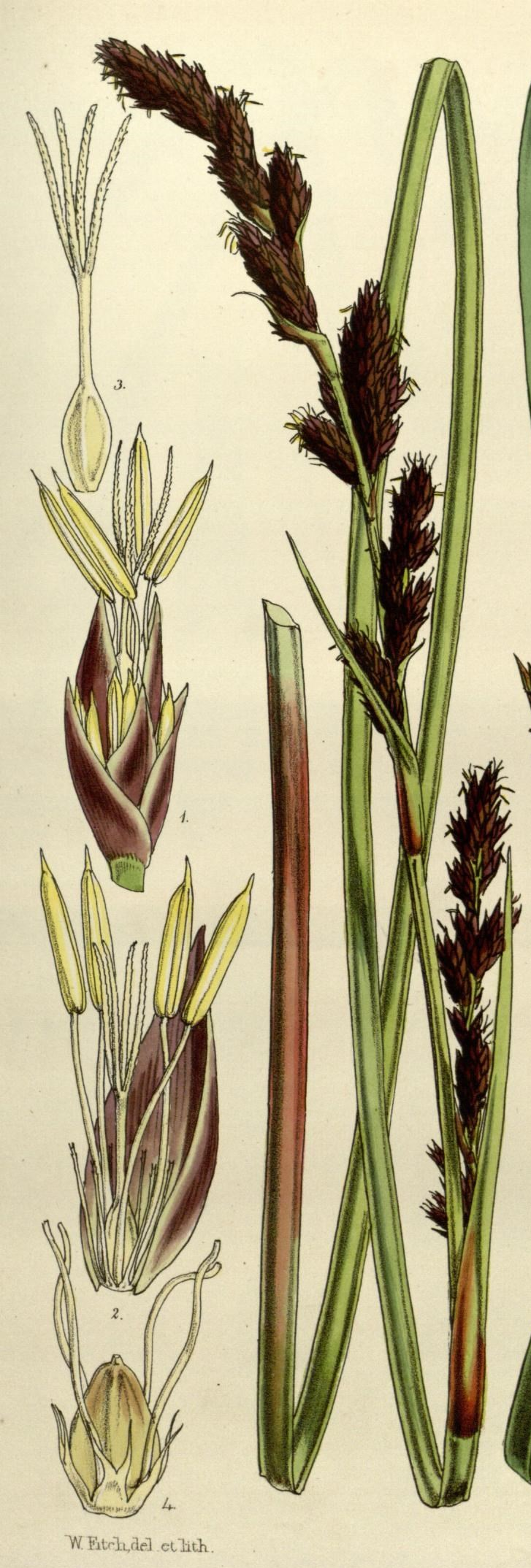
- (Fitch, 1860)

Scientific classification
- Kingdom: Plantae
- Clade: Tracheophytes
- Clade: Angiosperms
- Clade: Monocots
- Clade: Commelinids
- Order: Poales
- Family: Cyperaceae
- Genus: Lepidosperma
- Species: L. oldfieldii

Binomial name
- Lepidosperma oldfieldii Hook.f.
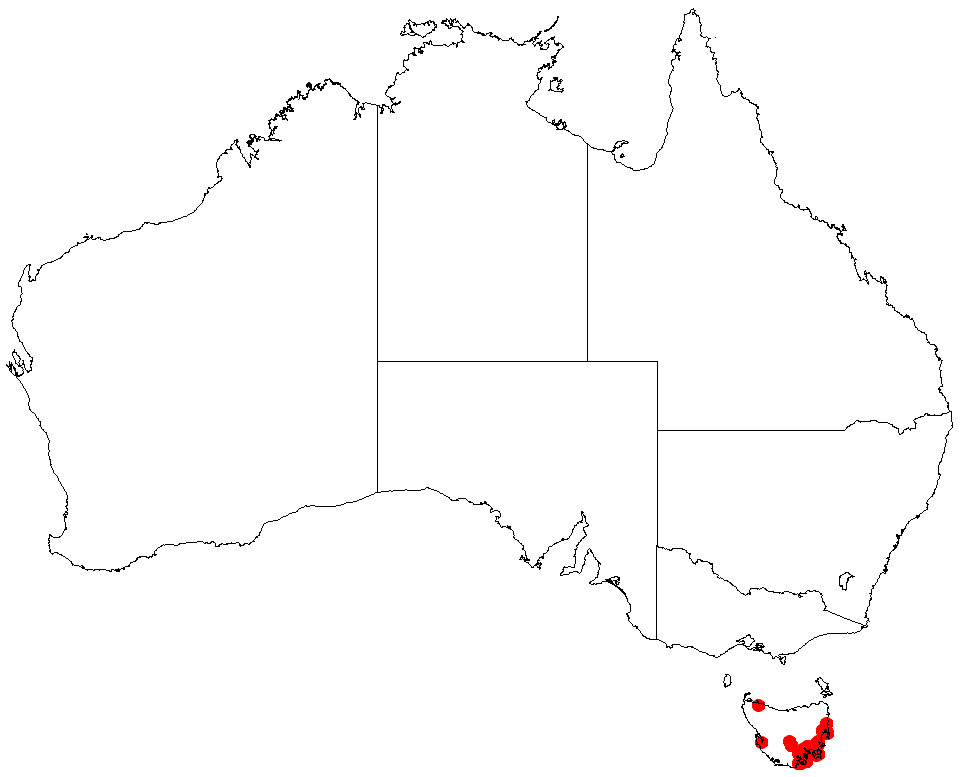
- Occurrence data from AVH

Synonyms
- Lepidosperma elatius var. oldfieldii (Hook.f.) Rodway

= Lepidosperma oldfieldii =

Species of grass-like plant

Lepidosperma oldfieldii is a sedge (in the family Cyperaceae) that is native to Tasmania. It was first described in 1860 by Joseph Hooker.

Hooker says of the species that it is similar to L. elatius, but smaller and more slender "with a different panicle, which is very long (6-18 inches), and .... covered with fascicled chesnut-brown spikelets. ... The spikelets have a subsquarrose appearance. The edges of the culms are very scabrous, and cut severely."
