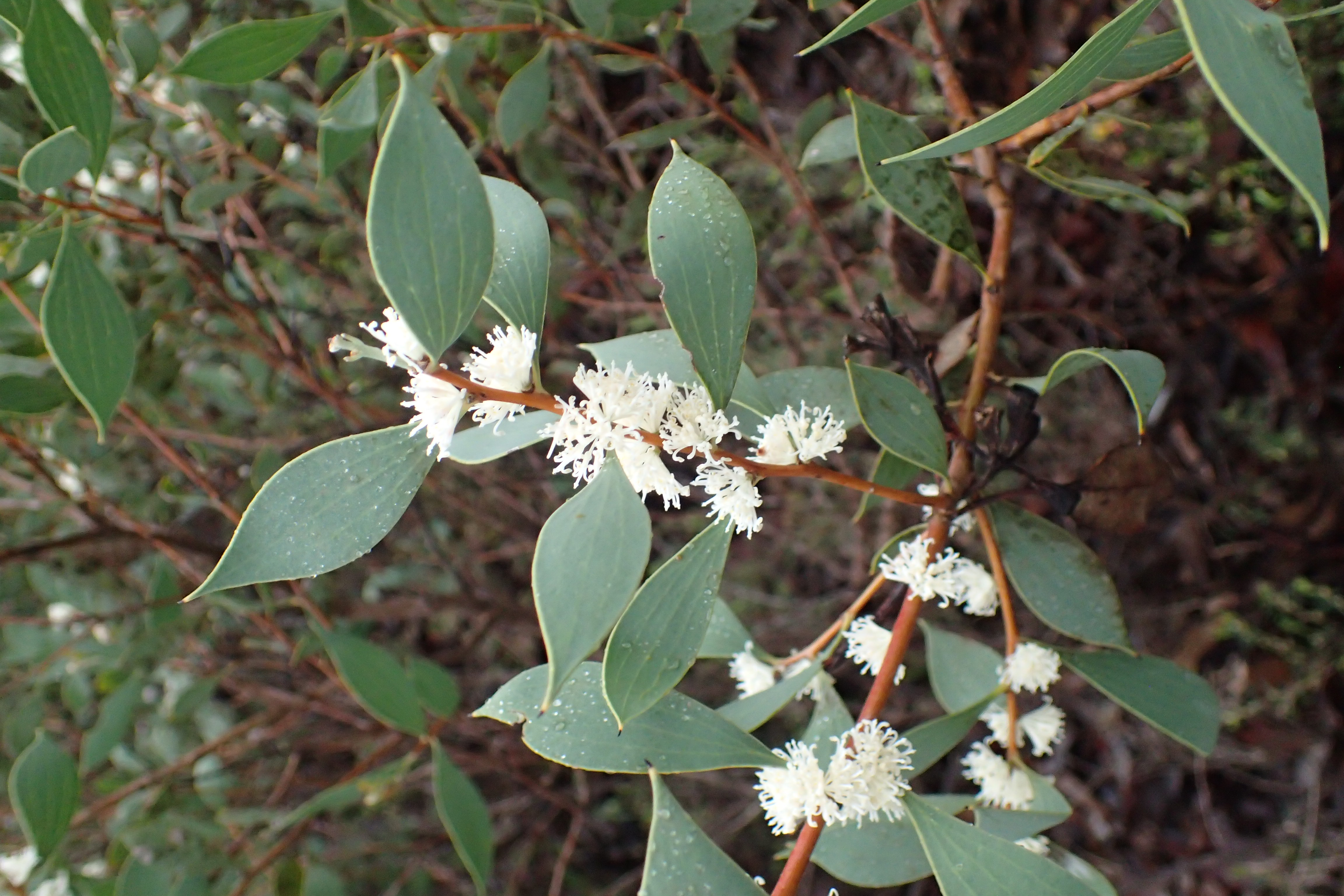

Scientific classification
- Kingdom: Plantae
- Clade: Tracheophytes
- Clade: Angiosperms
- Clade: Eudicots
- Order: Proteales
- Family: Proteaceae
- Genus: Hakea
- Species: H. loranthifolia

Binomial name
- Hakea loranthifolia Meisn.
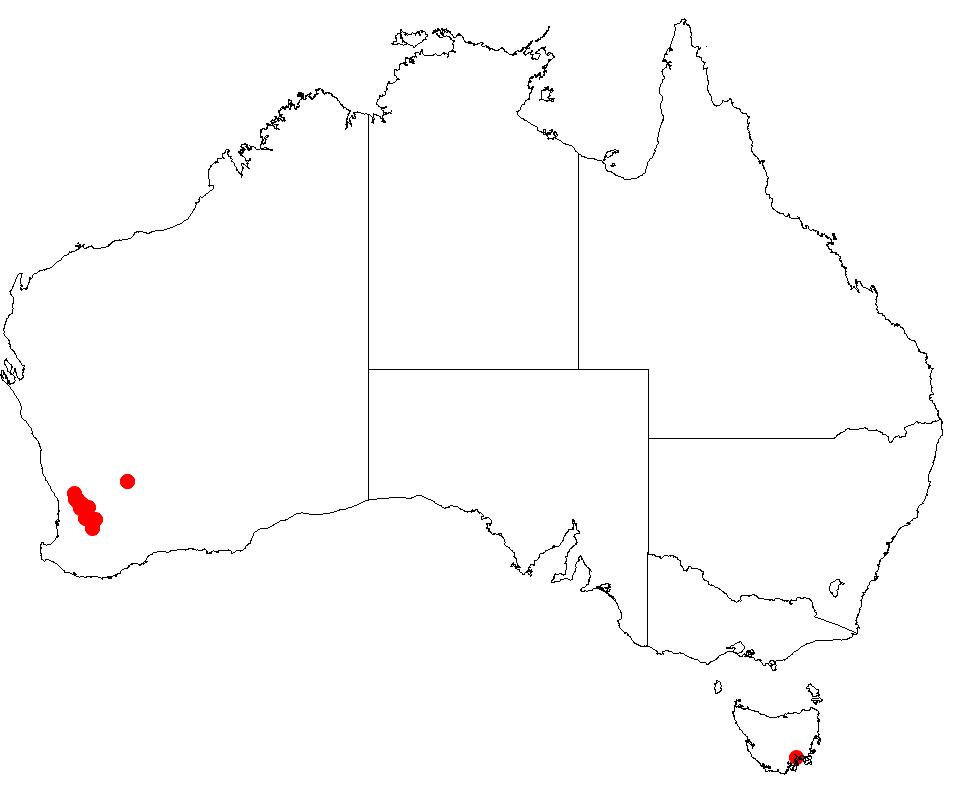
- Occurrence data from AVH

= Hakea loranthifolia =

Species of shrub endemic to Western Australia

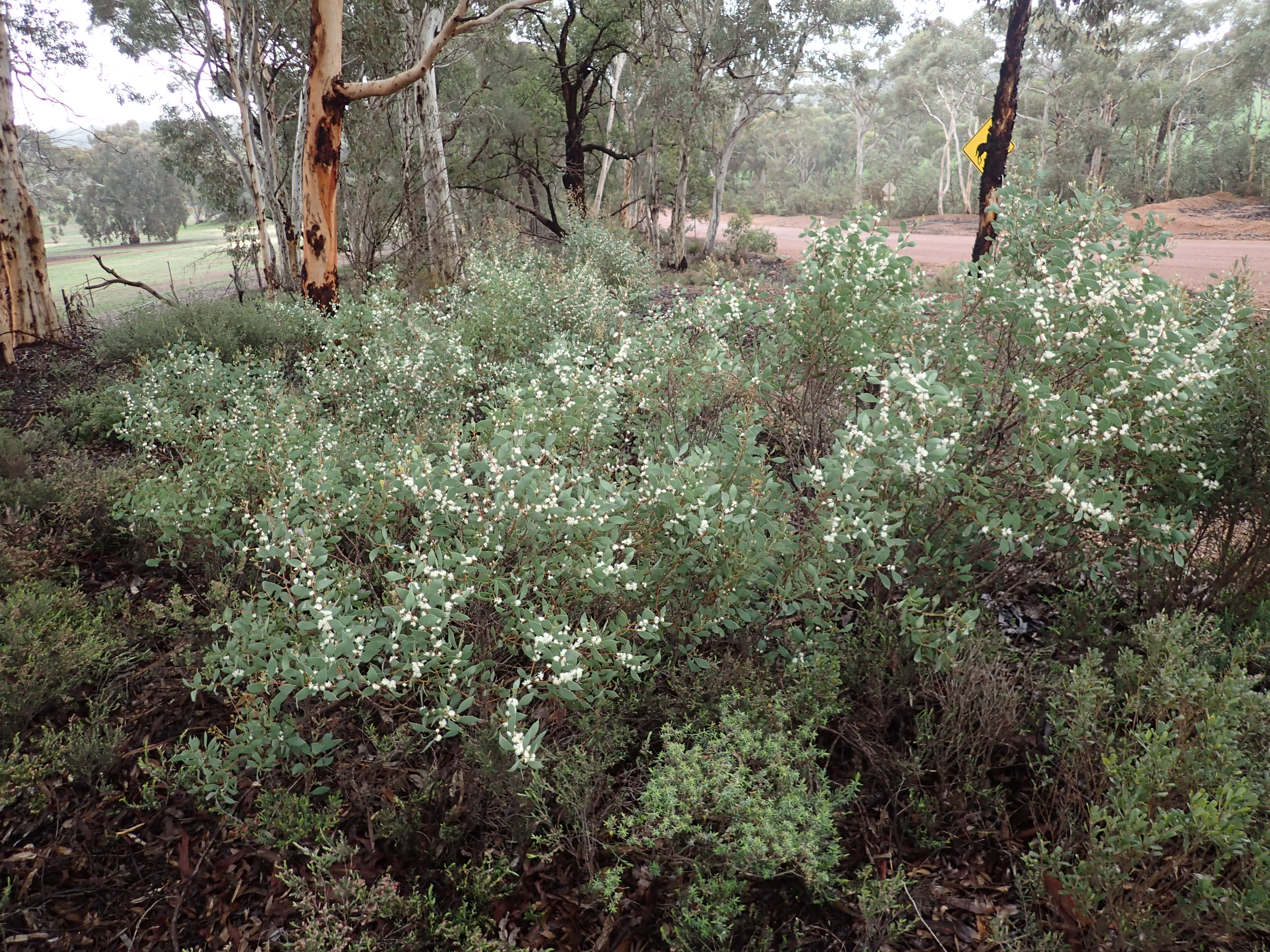
Habit near York

Hakea loranthifolia is a shrub of the family Proteaceae and is endemic to Western Australia. It has an open growth habit, stiff egg-shaped leaves with longitudinal veins, smooth grey bark and white flowers from July to September.

== Description ==
Hakea loranthifolia is an upright, open shrub typically growing to a height of 2 to 3 metres (7 to 10 ft). It is a sparingly branched shrub with smooth branchlets by flowering. The green leaves have an elliptic to egg-shape that is rarely undulate, 4.2 to 8.5 centimetres (1.7 to 3.3 in) long and 13 to 23 millimetres (0.51 to 0.91 in) wide. The leaves have one to three longitudinal veins on the top and three to five underneath, tapering at the base, smooth edges and gradually tapering at the apex. The inflorescence consists of 10–16 white flowers in a cluster of 1–3 per leaf axil. Flowering occurs from July to September. The pedicel are smooth, the perianth white and pistil 5–6.3 mm (0.20–0.25 in) long. The fruit are smooth, egg-shaped and taper to an upward curving beak, 1.6–2.5 cm (0.63–0.98 in) long and 0.9–1.8 cm (0.35–0.71 in) wide.

== Taxonomy and naming ==
The species was first formally described by the botanist Carl Meissner in 1845 as part of Johann Georg Christian Lehmann's work Proteaceae. Plantae Preissianae. The specific epithet means "Loranthus-leaved".

== Distribution ==
It is endemic to an area in the Wheatbelt region of Western Australia between Northam in the north down to Narrogin in the south. It is found in sandy gravelly soils often around laterite. It is often found on and around breakaways and is a part of the understorey in open Eucalyptus wandoo and Eucalyptus accedens woodland communities.
