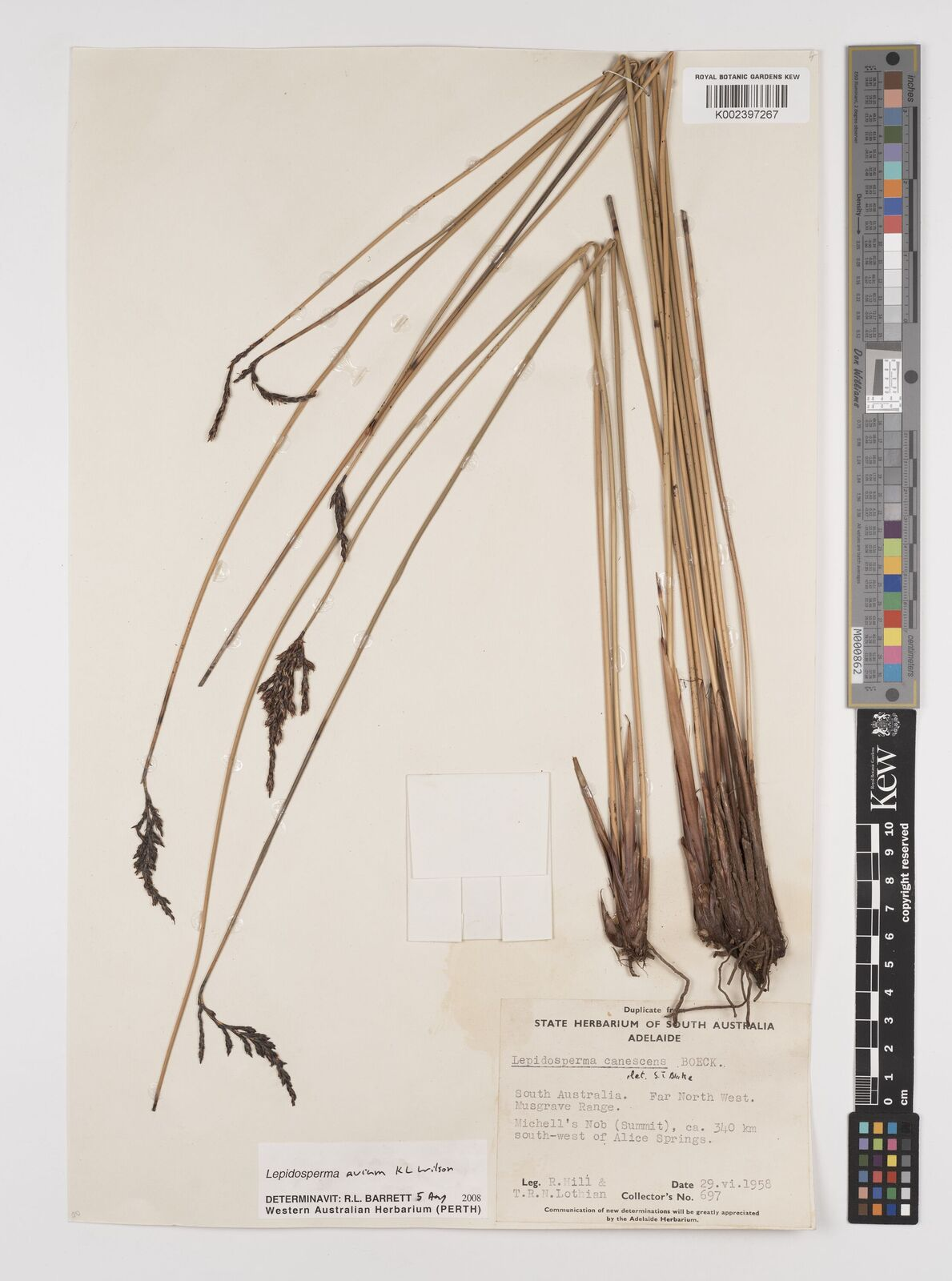

Scientific classification
- Kingdom: Plantae
- Clade: Tracheophytes
- Clade: Angiosperms
- Clade: Monocots
- Clade: Commelinids
- Order: Poales
- Family: Cyperaceae
- Genus: Lepidosperma
- Species: L. avium

Binomial name
- Lepidosperma avium K.L.Wilson
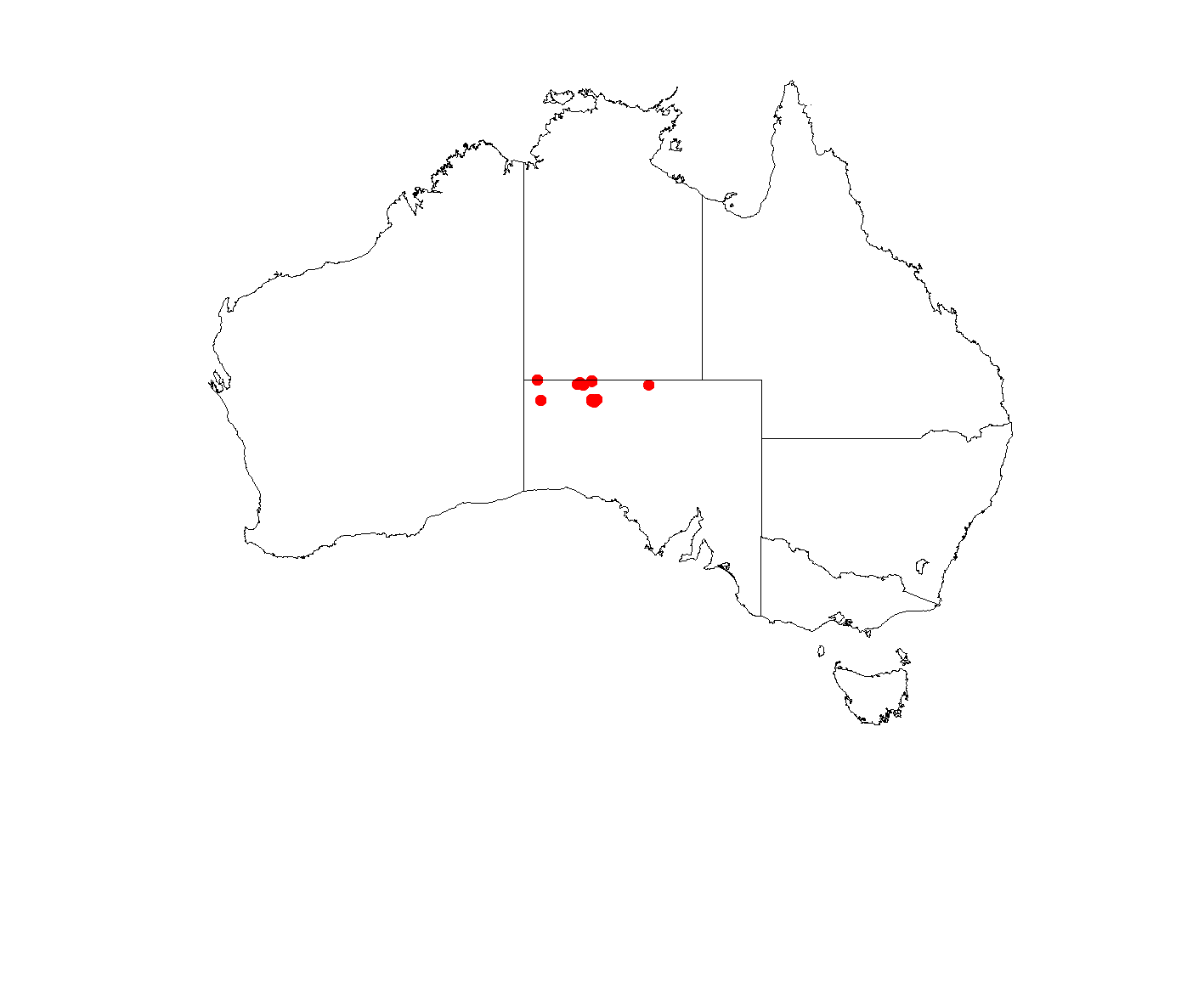

= Lepidosperma avium =

Species of sedge

Lepidosperma avium, commonly named the central Australian rapier-sedge and the desert rush, is a rare species of sedge found in the Everard Ranges of remote northern South Australia and neighbouring parts of the Northern Territory.

== Taxonomy ==
Lepidosperma avium was first scientifically described by Karen L. Wilson in 1994, from the Everard Ranges, which the species is believed to be endemic to.

L. avium shares the feature of having little, spiky branches and flattened flower clusters with several other species in the same genus: Lepidosperma clipeicola, Lepidosperma pauperum (from New Caledonia), Lepidosperma perteres, and Lepidosperma urophorum.

The species epithet refers to the species' remoteness – avium, comes from the Latin avius, meaning isolated or out of the way.

Specimens of the species are held in each of Australia's state herbariums, as well as in the Australian National Herbarium.

== Description ==
Lepidosperma avium forms clumps, between 1.2 and 2.4 metres (3.9 and 7.9 ft) tall. The stems are stiff, hairless, and smooth, less than a centimetre thick, with small lines and grooves all over the surface.

== Ecology ==
L. avium occupies a "petrophilous (rock-loving)" ecological niche. The sedges grow around rocky hills and boulders. The main threats to the species are bushfires.
