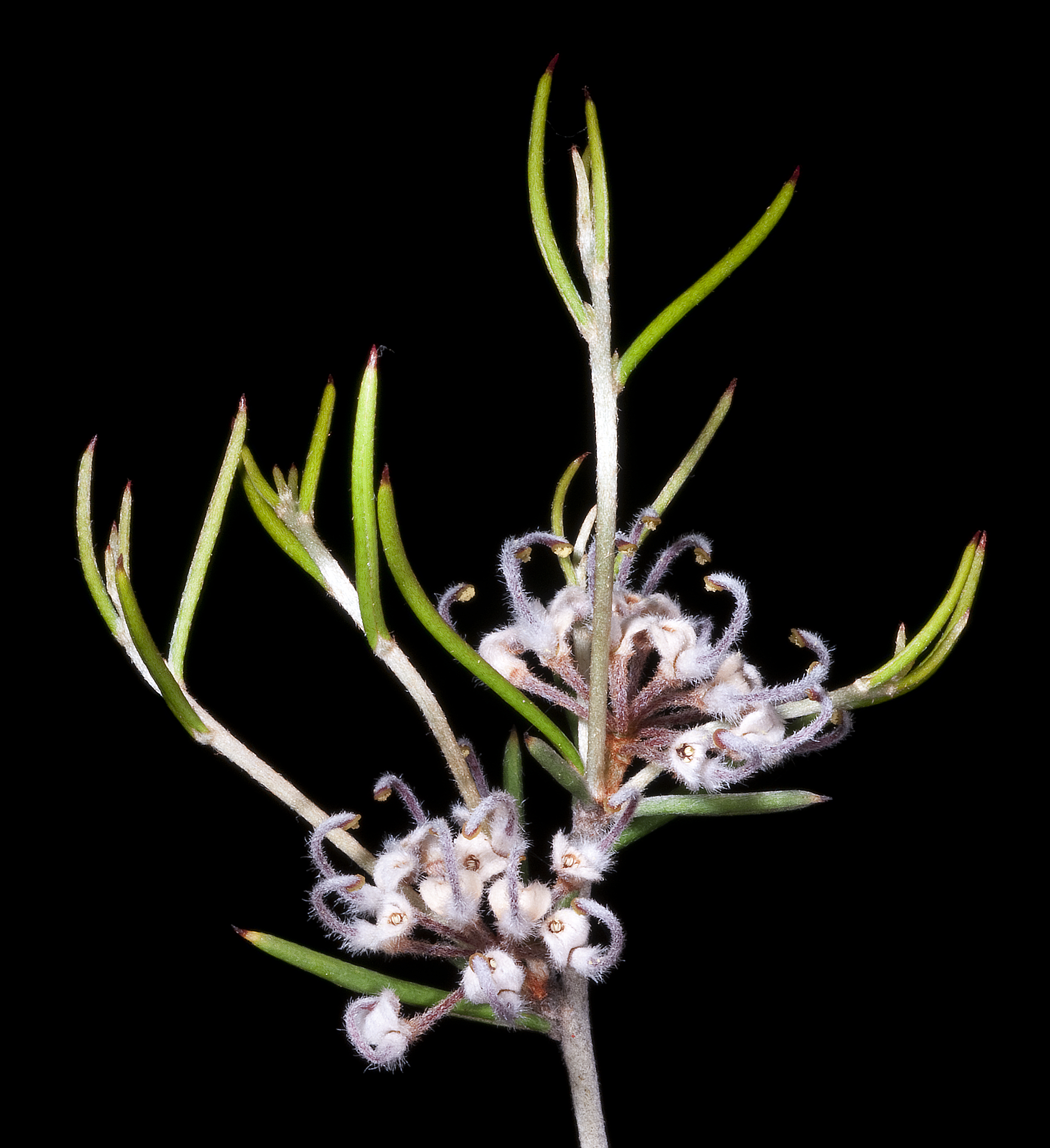

Scientific classification
- Kingdom: Plantae
- Clade: Tracheophytes
- Clade: Angiosperms
- Clade: Eudicots
- Order: Proteales
- Family: Proteaceae
- Genus: Grevillea
- Species: G. umbellulata

Binomial name
- Grevillea umbellulata Meisn.

Synonyms
- Grevillea acerosa F.Muell.; Grevillea umbellulata subsp. acerosa (F.Muell.) Olde & Marriott; Grevillea umbellulata Meisn. subsp. umbellulata

= Grevillea umbellulata =

Species of shrub endemic to Western Australia

Grevillea umbellulata is species of flowering plant in the family Proteaceae and is endemic to the south-west of Western Australia. It is a spreading shrub that forms a lignotuber, has linear to narrowly elliptic leaves, and cylindrical clusters of hairy, white to cream-coloured flowers often tinged with grey or pink.

== Description ==
Grevillea umbellulata is a spreading shrub that typically grows to a height of 0.3–1.8 m (1 ft 0 in – 5 ft 11 in) and forms a lignotuber. Its leaves are linear to narrowly elliptic, 7–50 mm (0.28–1.97 in) long and 0.6–3.5 mm (0.024–0.138 in) wide. The edges of the leaves are rolled under, usually concealing most of the lower surface. The flowers are arranged in umbel-like clusters, the flowers nearer the base of the rachis flowering first. The flowers are hairy, white to cream-coloured often with a pale grey or pink tinge, the pistil 5.5–8.0 mm (0.22–0.31 in) long. Flowering occurs from July to November, and the fruit is a shaggy-hairy, narrowly oblong to oval follicle 8–12 mm (0.31–0.47 in) long.

== Taxonomy ==
Grevillea umbellulata was first formally described in 1848 by Carl Meissner in Lehmann's Plantae Preissianae, the type specimen collected by James Drummond in the Swan River Colony. The specific epithet (umbellulata) means "umbel-like".

== Distribution and habitat ==
This grevillea grows in a variety of habitats including in wandoo or marri woodland, mallee scrub and low heath, on sandplains, slopes, swamps, river banks and railway verges growing in sandy, clay or gravel soils around or over granite, limestone or laterite. It is widespread in the Avon Wheatbelt, Esperance Plains, Geraldton Sandplains, Jarrah Forest, Mallee and Swan Coastal Plain bioregions of south-western Western Australia.

== See also ==
- List of Grevillea species
