= Lepidosperma bungalbin =

Conservation status
- Priority One — Poorly Known Taxa (DEC)

Scientific classification
- Kingdom: Plantae
- Clade: Tracheophytes
- Clade: Angiosperms
- Clade: Monocots
- Clade: Commelinids
- Order: Poales
- Family: Cyperaceae
- Genus: Lepidosperma
- Species: L. bungalbin

Binomial name
- Lepidosperma bungalbin R.L.Barrett
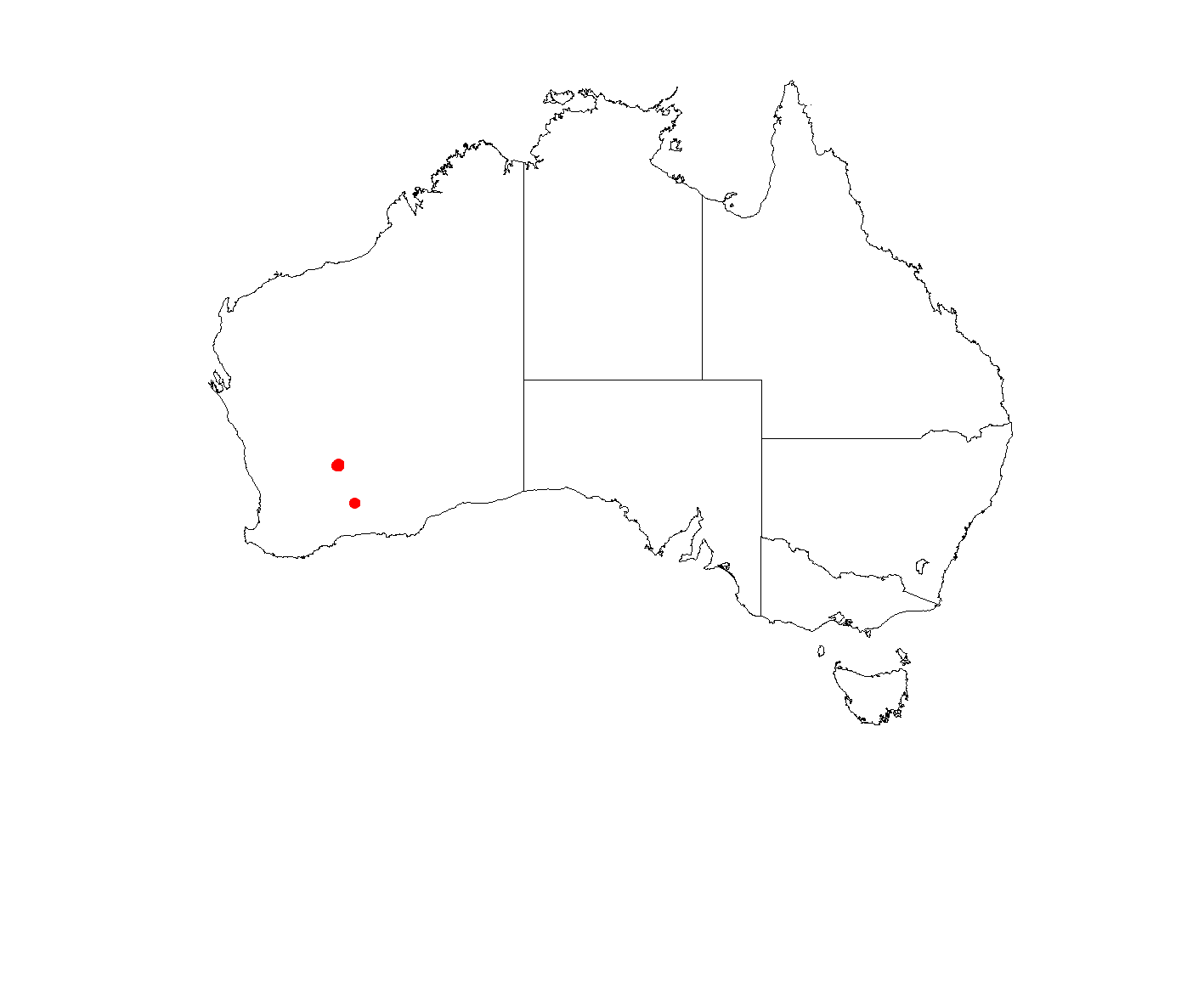

Species of sedge

Lepidosperma bungalbin is a rare species of sedge endemic to one mountain range in Western Australia. It was described in 1995 by RusselL L. Barrett.

Lepidosperma bungalbin is found exclusively on hillsides in the banded ironstone Helena and Aurora Range in Western Australia, an area in danger of potential mining operations. The species is accordingly classified as conservation priority one in Western Australia. It survives in its rocky habitat owing to water runoff from occasional precipitation.

Lepidosperma bungalbin grows between 23 and 64 centimetres (9.1 and 25.2 in) in height, with bright green to yellow leaves.
