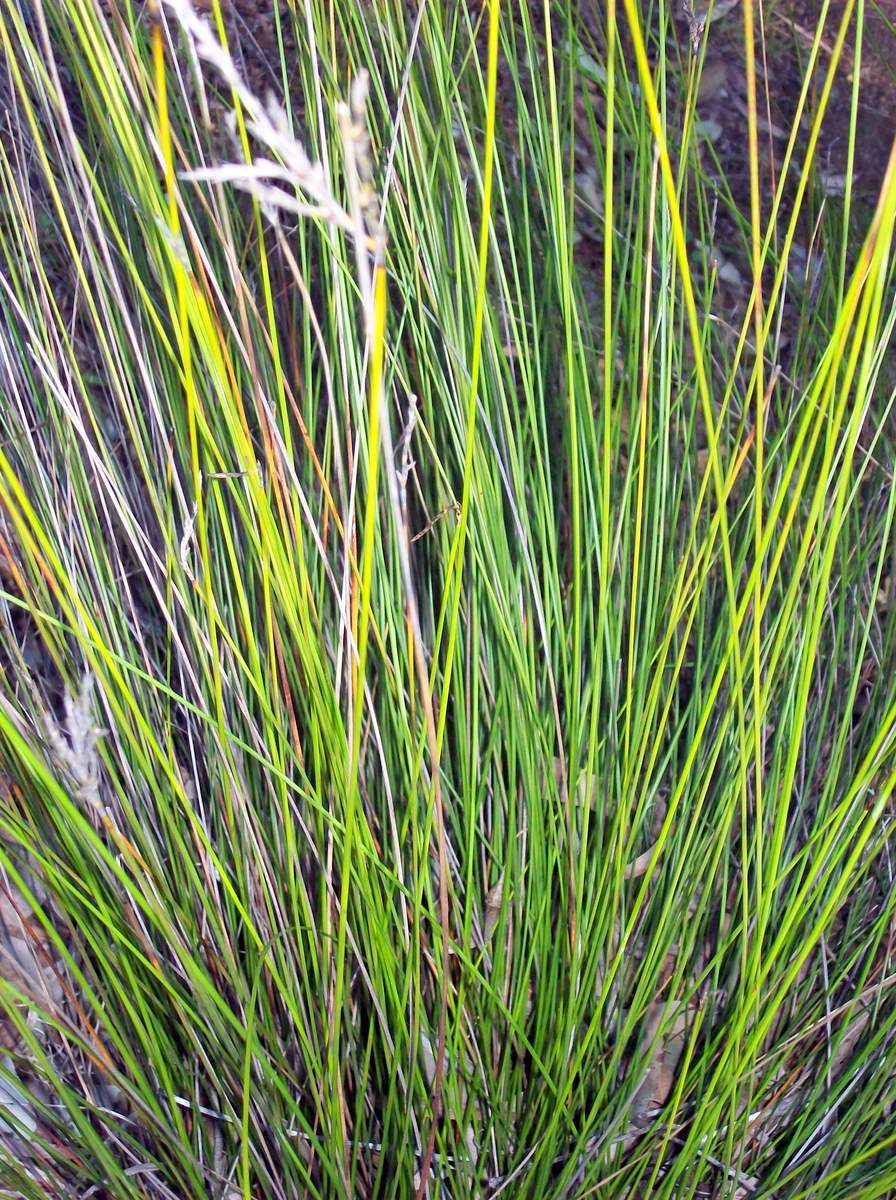

Scientific classification
- Kingdom: Plantae
- Clade: Tracheophytes
- Clade: Angiosperms
- Clade: Monocots
- Clade: Commelinids
- Order: Poales
- Family: Cyperaceae
- Genus: Lepidosperma
- Species: L. urophorum

Binomial name
- Lepidosperma urophorum N.A.Wakef.
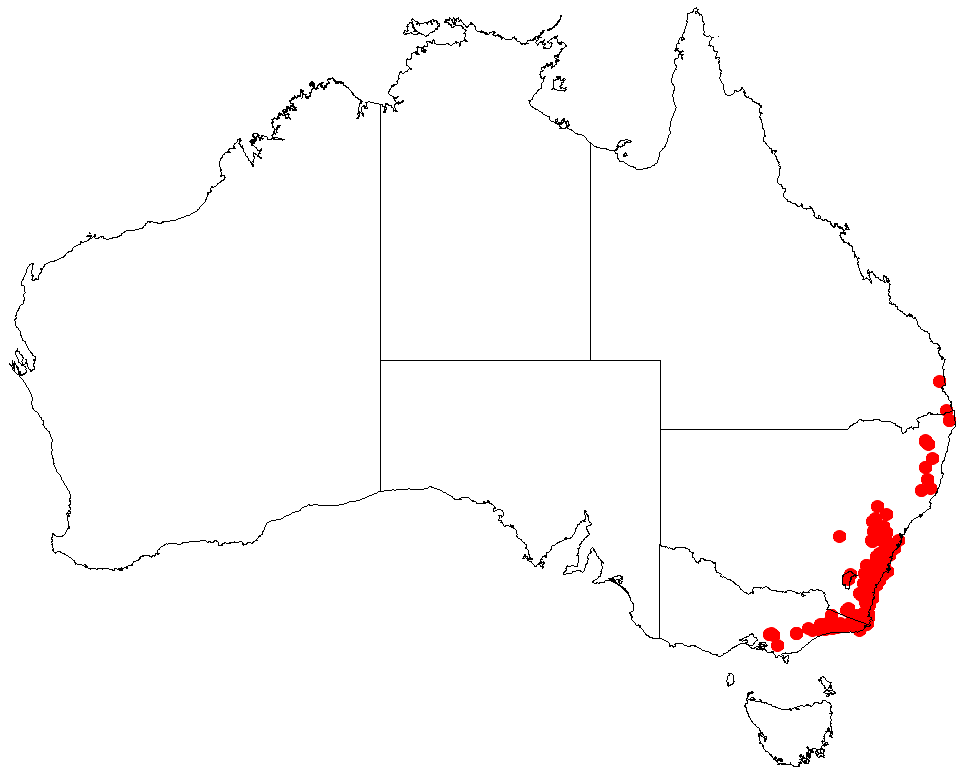
- Occurrence data from AVH

= Lepidosperma urophorum =

Rapier saw sedge

Species of grass-like plant

Lepidosperma urophorum, the rapier saw sedge is a forest dwelling plant found in south eastern Australia. Often found on sandy soils near streams. It may grow to 1.5 metres high.

The specific epithet urophorum is derived from the Greek meaning "tail-bearing". Which refers to the slender inflorescence. It is distinguished from Lepidosperma flexuosum by the flower panicle branchlets being straight, rather than crooked.
