= Lepidosperma angustatum =

Scientific classification
- Kingdom: Plantae
- Clade: Tracheophytes
- Clade: Angiosperms
- Clade: Monocots
- Clade: Commelinids
- Order: Poales
- Family: Cyperaceae
- Genus: Lepidosperma
- Species: L. angustatum

Binomial name
- Lepidosperma angustatum R.Br.
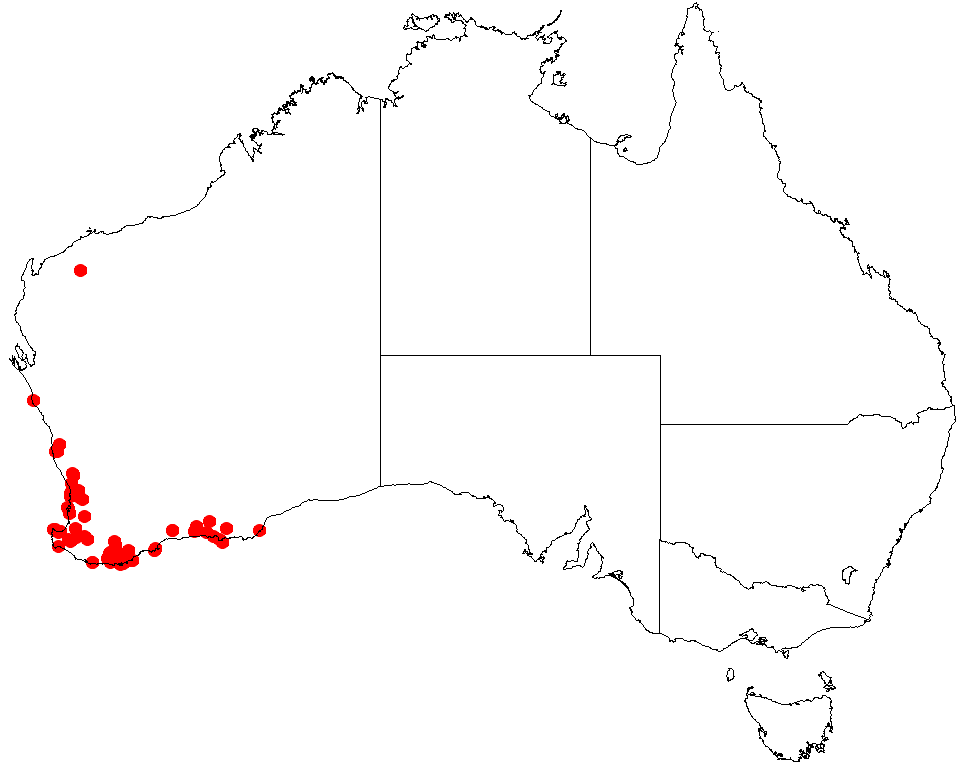
- Occurrence data from AVH

Species of grass-like plant

Lepidosperma angustatum is a sedge of the family Cyperaceae that is native to Western Australia.

The rhizomatous sedge typically grows to a height of 0.5 metres (1.6 ft) and to about 0.3 m (1.0 ft) wide. In Western Australia it is found along the coast on steep slopes as two separate populations in the Peel and Great Southern regions where it grows in sandy-clay-loam soils over or around granite.
