= Lepidosperma amantiferrum =

Conservation status
- Priority One — Poorly Known Taxa (DEC)

Scientific classification
- Kingdom: Plantae
- Clade: Tracheophytes
- Clade: Angiosperms
- Clade: Monocots
- Clade: Commelinids
- Order: Poales
- Family: Cyperaceae
- Genus: Lepidosperma
- Species: L. amantiferrum

Binomial name
- Lepidosperma amantiferrum R.L.Barrett
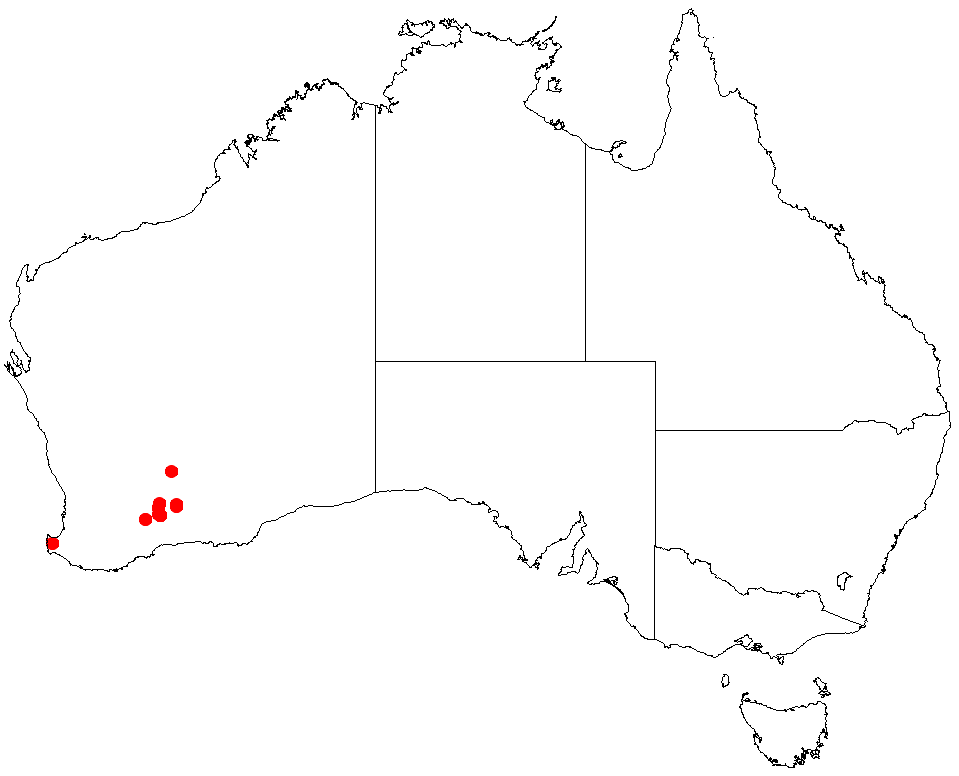
- Occurrence data from AVH

Species of grass-like plant

Lepidosperma amantiferrum is a sedge of the family Cyperaceae that is endemic to Western Australia. It has no synonyms.

Lepidosperma amantiferrum is a tufted, rhizomatous sedge which typically grows to a height of 0.42 metres (1.4 ft). Its leaves and culms are distichous (i.e., arranged in two rows on opposite sides of a stem and in the same plane). In Western Australia it is found in the IBRA Mallee biogeographic region where it grows in yellow sandy loam with banded ironstone gravel and rocks on gentle lower slopes.
