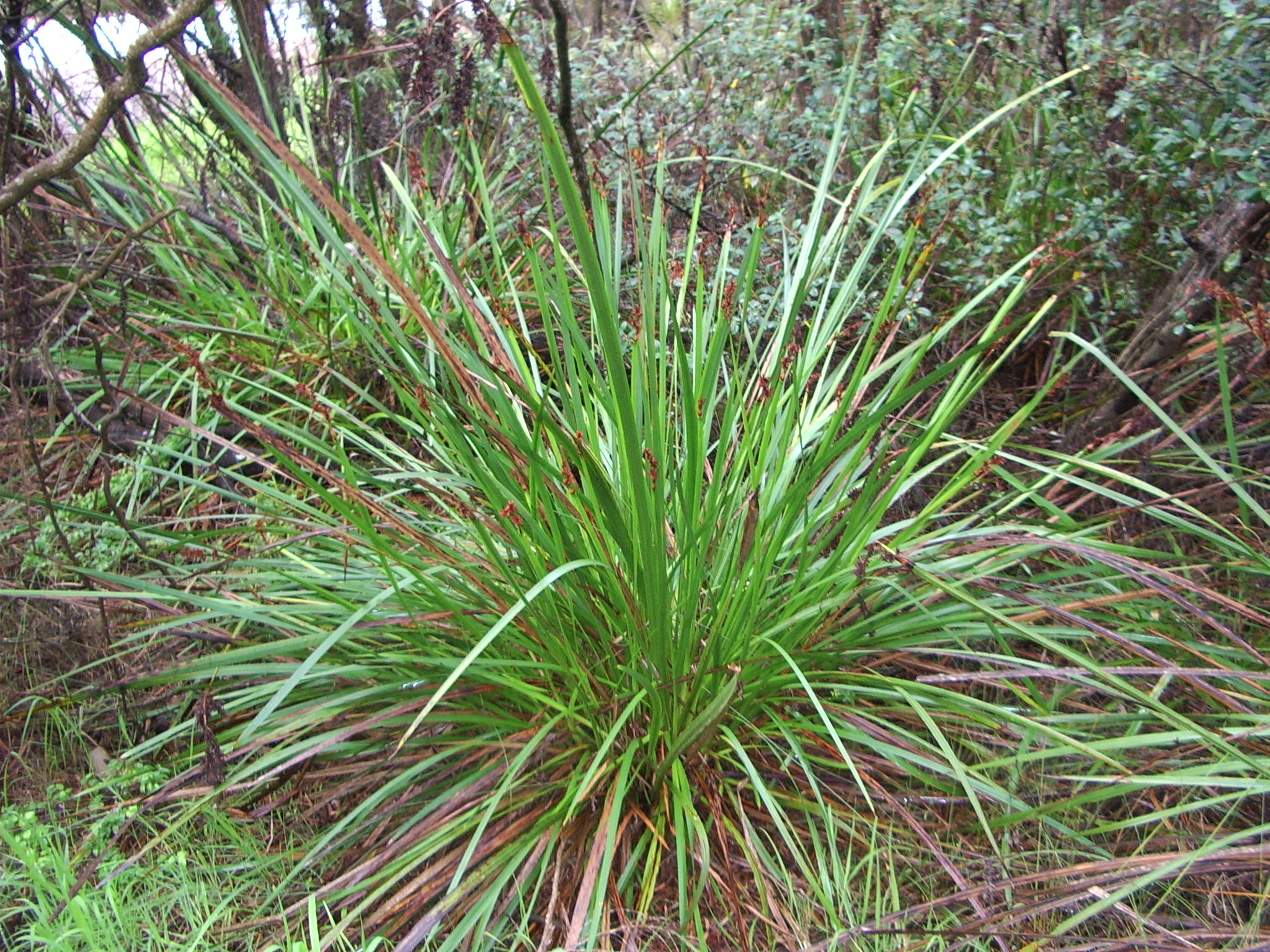
- Lepidosperma gladiatum

Scientific classification
- Kingdom: Plantae
- Clade: Tracheophytes
- Clade: Angiosperms
- Clade: Monocots
- Clade: Commelinids
- Order: Poales
- Family: Cyperaceae
- Genus: Lepidosperma; Labill.

Synonyms
- Lepidotosperma Roem. & Schult.; Machaerina Nees; Vauthiera A.Rich. in J.S.C.Dumont d'Urville

= Lepidosperma =

Genus of grass-like plants

Lepidosperma is a genus of flowering plant of the family Cyperaceae. Most of the species are endemic to Australia, with others native to southern China, southeast Asia, New Guinea, New Caledonia and New Zealand.

== Species ==
The following species are recognised in the genus Lepidosperma:

Abbreviations in capital letters after the names represent states in Australia.

- Lepidosperma amantiferrum R.L.Barrett - WA
- Lepidosperma angustatum R.Br. - WA
- Lepidosperma angustifolium Hook.f. - TAS
- Lepidosperma apricola R.L.Barrett - WA
- Lepidosperma asperatum (Kük.) R.L.Barrett -WA
- Lepidosperma australe (A.Rich.) Hook.f - New Zealand incl Chatham Island
- Lepidosperma avium K.L.Wilson - NT, SA
- Lepidosperma benthamianum C.B.Clarke - WA
- Lepidosperma bungalbin R.L.Barrett - WA
- Lepidosperma calcicola R.L.Barrett & K.L.Wilson - WA
- Lepidosperma canescens Boeck. - SA, VIC
- Lepidosperma carphoides F.Muell. ex Benth. Black Rapier Sedge - WA, SA, VIC
- Lepidosperma chinense Nees & Meyen ex Kunth - Fujian, Guangdong, Guangxi, Hainan, Hunan, Zhejiang, Indonesia, Malaysia, Papua New Guinea, Vietnam
- Lepidosperma clipeicola K.L.Wilson - NSW QLD
- Lepidosperma concavum R.Br. Sandhill Sword-sedge - NSW
- Lepidosperma congestum R.Br. - SOA, VIC
- Lepidosperma costale Nees - WA
- Lepidosperma curtisiae K.L.Wilson & D.I.Morris - NSW SOA TAS VIC
- Lepidosperma diurnum R.L.Barrett - WA
- Lepidosperma drummondii Benth. - WA
- Lepidosperma effusum Benth. Spreading Sword-sedge - WA
- Lepidosperma elatius Labill. - NSW TAS VIC
- Lepidosperma ensiforme (Rodway) D.I.Morris - TAS
- Lepidosperma evansianum K.L.Wilson - NSW
- Lepidosperma fairallianum R.L.Barrett - WA
- Lepidosperma ferricola R.L.Barrett - WA
- Lepidosperma ferriculmen R.L.Barrett - WA
- Lepidosperma filiforme Labill. Common Rapier-sedge - NSW TAS VIC New Zealand
- Lepidosperma fimbriatum Nees in J.G.C.Lehmann - WA
- Lepidosperma flexuosum R.Br. - NSW
- Lepidosperma forsythii A.A.Ham. - NSW TAS VIC
- Lepidosperma gahnioides R.L.Barrett- SA, WA
- Lepidosperma gibsonii R.L.Barrett - WA
- Lepidosperma gladiatum Labill. Coast Sword-sedge - NSW SA TAS VIC WA
- Lepidosperma globosum Labill - TAS
- Lepidosperma gracile R.Br. - WA
- Lepidosperma gunnii Boeckeler - NSW QLD TAS VIC
- Lepidosperma hispidulum G.T.Plunkett, J.J.Bruhl & K.L.Wilson. - SA
- Lepidosperma hopperi R.L.Barrett - WA
- Lepidosperma humile (Nees) Boeckeler - WA
- Lepidosperma inops F.Muell. ex Rodway - TAS
- Lepidosperma jacksonense R.L.Barrett - WA
- Lepidosperma laeve R.Br. - VIC
- Lepidosperma latens K.L.Wilson - NSW
- Lepidosperma laterale R.Br. Variable Sword-sedge - NSW QLD SA TAS VIC, New Zealand North Island
- Lepidosperma leptophyllum Benth. - WA
- Lepidosperma leptostachyum Benth. - WA
- Lepidosperma limicola N.A.Wakef. - NSW QLD VIC
- Lepidosperma lineare R.Br - NSW QLD TAS VIC
- Lepidosperma longitudinale Labill. Pithy Sword-sedge - Australia (all 6 states)
- Lepidosperma lyonsii R.L.Barrett - WA
- Lepidosperma monticola G.T.Plunkett & J.J.Bruhl
- Lepidosperma muelleri Boeckeler - SA VIC
- Lepidosperma neesii Kunth - NSW SA VIC
- Lepidosperma neozelandicum (Kük.) R.L.Barrett & K.L.Wilson - New Zealand
- Lepidosperma obtusum Kük - WA
- Lepidosperma oldfieldii Hook.f. - TAS
- Lepidosperma oldhamii R.L.Barrett - WA
- Lepidosperma pauperum Kük - New Caledonia
- Lepidosperma perplanum Guillaumin - New Caledonia
- Lepidosperma persecans S.T.Blake - WA
- Lepidosperma perteres C.B.Clarke - New Caledonia
- Lepidosperma prospectum G.T.Plunkett & R.L.Barrett - NSW
- Lepidosperma pruinosum Kuk. - WA
- Lepidosperma pubisquameum Steud. - WA
- Lepidosperma quadrangulatum A.A.Ham. - NSW QLD
- Lepidosperma resinosum (Lehm.) F.Muell. - WA
- Lepidosperma rigidulum (Kük.) K.L.Wilson - WA
- Lepidosperma rostratum S.T.Blake - WA
- Lepidosperma rupestre Benth Kalbarri Lepidosperma - WA
- Lepidosperma sanguinolentum K.L.Wilson - WA
- Lepidosperma scabrum Nees - WA
- Lepidosperma semiteres Boeck. - NSW SA VIC
- Lepidosperma sieberi Kunth - NSW TAS VIC
- Lepidosperma squamatum Labill. - WA
- Lepidosperma striatum R.Br. - WA
- Lepidosperma tenue Benth. - WA
- Lepidosperma tetraquetrum Nees - WA
- Lepidosperma tortuosum F.Muell.) - NSW TAS VIC
- Lepidosperma tuberculatum Nees - NSW QLD WAU
- Lepidosperma urophorum N.A.Wakef. - NSW QLD VIC
- Lepidosperma ustulatum Steud. - WA
- Lepidosperma viscidum R.Br. Sticky Sword Sedge - NSW QLD VIC
