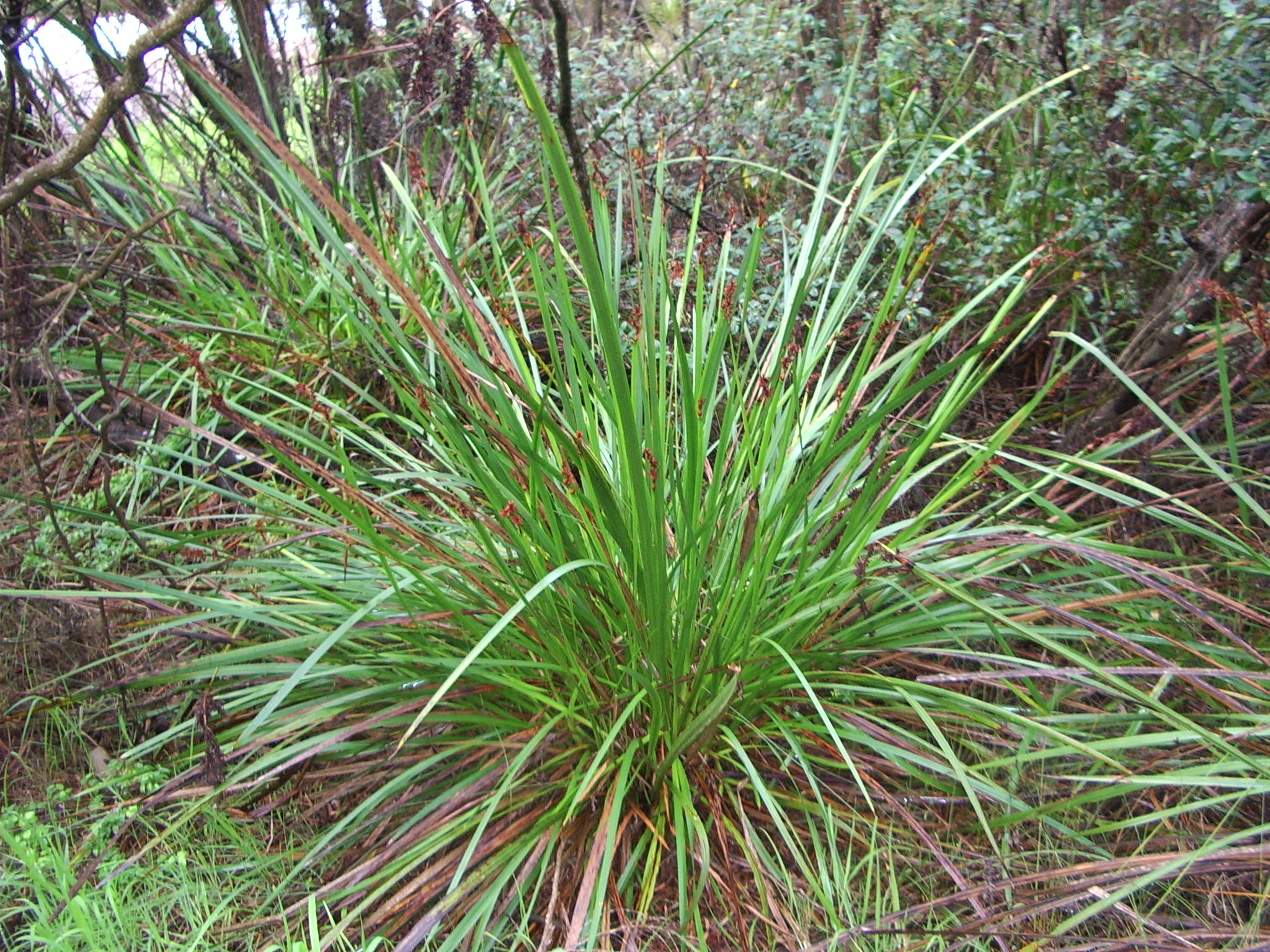

Scientific classification
- Kingdom: Plantae
- Clade: Tracheophytes
- Clade: Angiosperms
- Clade: Monocots
- Clade: Commelinids
- Order: Poales
- Family: Cyperaceae
- Genus: Lepidosperma
- Species: L. gladiatum

Binomial name
- Lepidosperma gladiatum Labill.
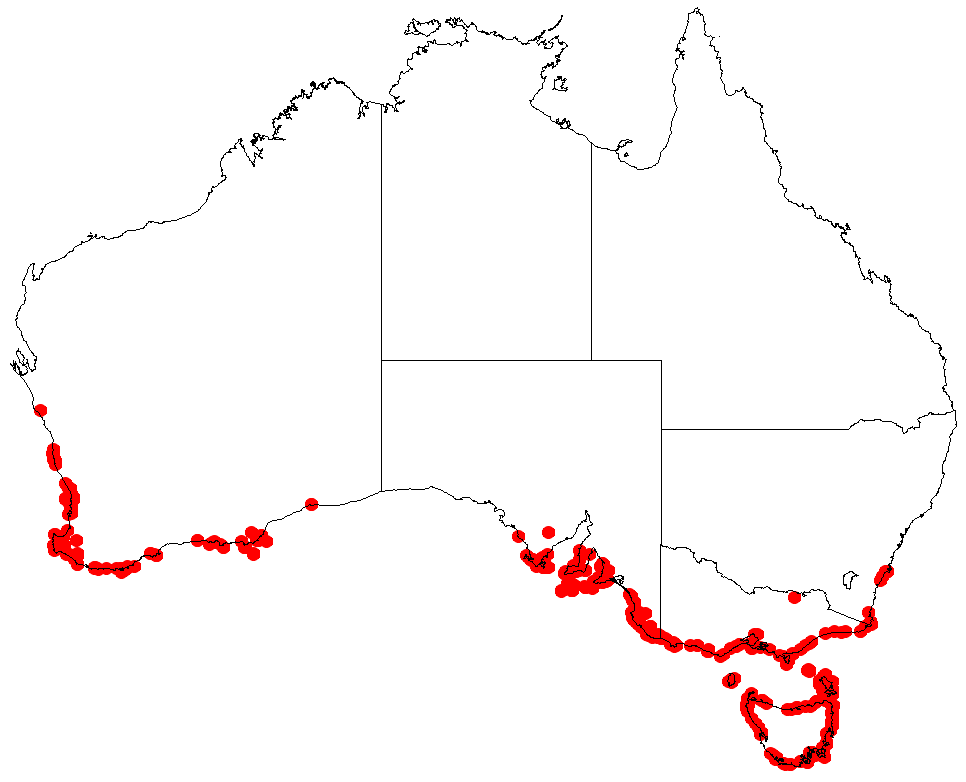
- Occurrence data from AVH

= Lepidosperma gladiatum =

Coast sword-sedge

Species of plant

Lepidosperma gladiatum is commonly known as the coast sword-sedge or coastal sword-sedge. It is an evergreen species of sedge that is native to southern coastal areas of Australia. It was described by French botanist Jacques Labillardière in 1805. The Noongar name for the plant is kerbein.

== Description ==
L. gladiatum occurs mostly as a dense sedge that favours dunes and creek lines. Described as clump-forming perennial with stout vertical rhizome. Forms dense canopy with large clumps of dark green strap-like leaves. The flat leaves are 150mm long and 25mm wide with a sharp pointed end. The plant can be as tall and wide as 3m (though typically it is smaller).

L. gladiatum produces brown spiky flowers on long central stalks. The flowers are hermaphroditic.

== Distribution and habitat ==
L. gladiatum in coastal regions around Australia in the States of New South Wales, Victoria (Australia), Tasmania, South Australia and Western Australia. In Southwest Australia it can be found as far north as Cervantes and as far east as Cape Arid National Park.

== Uses ==
The seedheads have been used to feed captive red-eared firetails, the finch-like species Stagonopleura oculata, their deft extraction and enthusiasm for the seed suggests it is consumed in its usual habitat.
