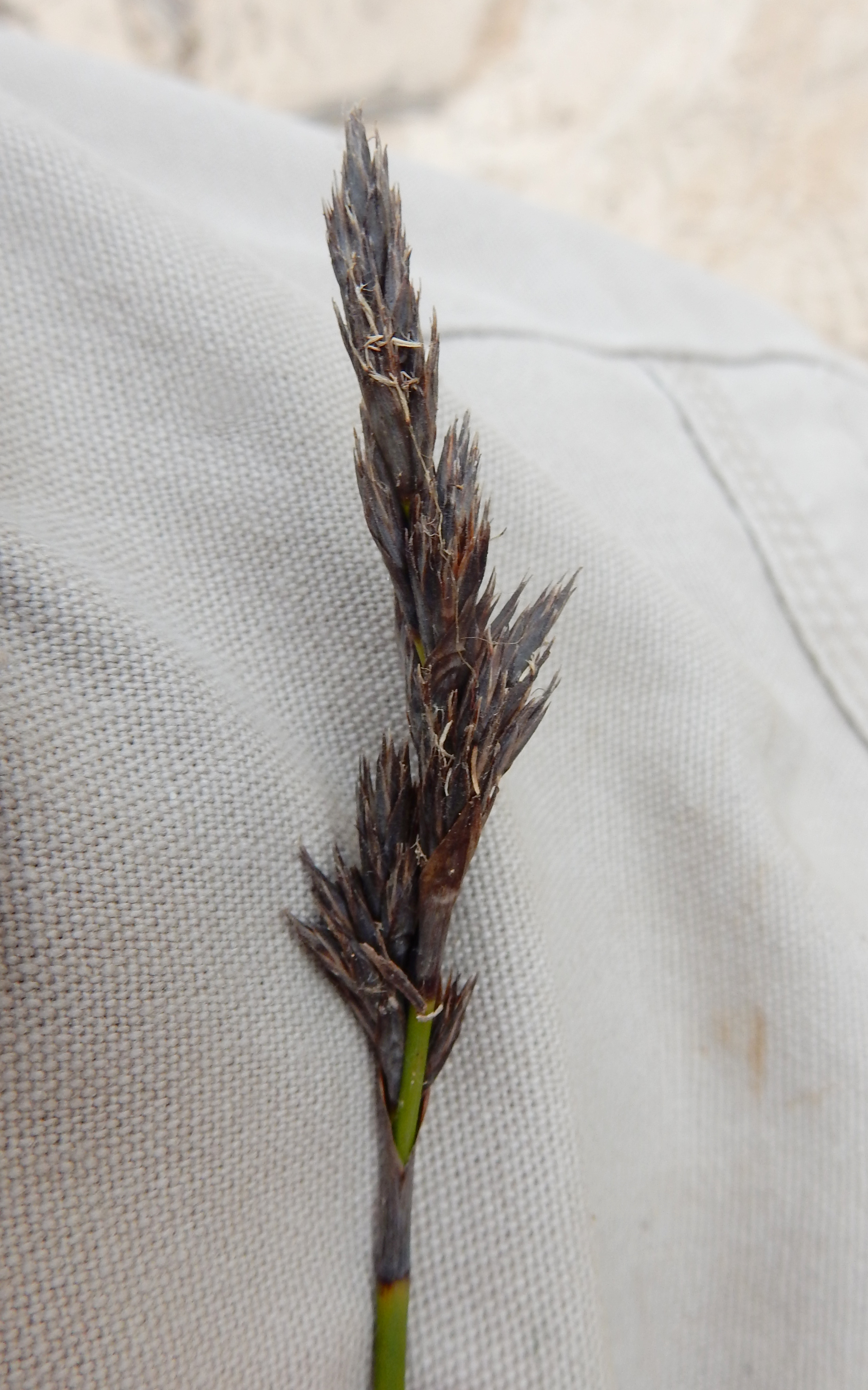

Scientific classification
- Kingdom: Plantae
- Clade: Tracheophytes
- Clade: Angiosperms
- Clade: Monocots
- Clade: Commelinids
- Order: Poales
- Family: Cyperaceae
- Genus: Lepidosperma
- Species: L. neesii

Binomial name
- Lepidosperma neesii Kunth
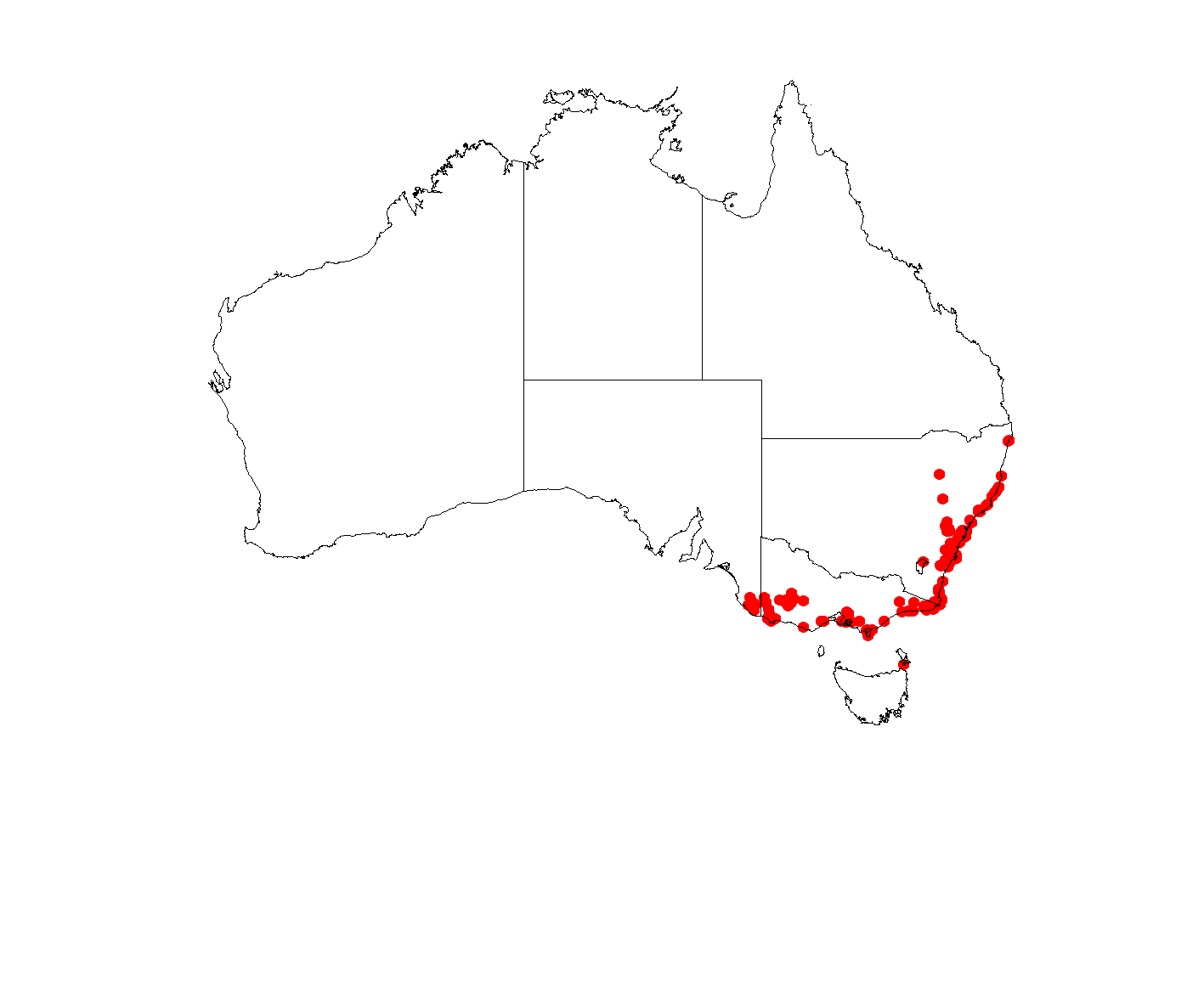
- Occurrence data from AVH

= Lepidosperma neesii =

saw sedge

Species of plant

Lepidosperma neesii is a grass-like plant found in south eastern Australia. Usually seen in heath and woodland on moist sites, it may grow to 80 centimetres tall. The specific epithet neesii honours the botanist Christian Gottfried Daniel Nees von Esenbeck.
