= Lepidosperma asperatum =

Scientific classification
- Kingdom: Plantae
- Clade: Tracheophytes
- Clade: Angiosperms
- Clade: Monocots
- Clade: Commelinids
- Order: Poales
- Family: Cyperaceae
- Genus: Lepidosperma
- Species: L. asperatum

Binomial name
- Lepidosperma asperatum (Kük.) R.L.Barrett
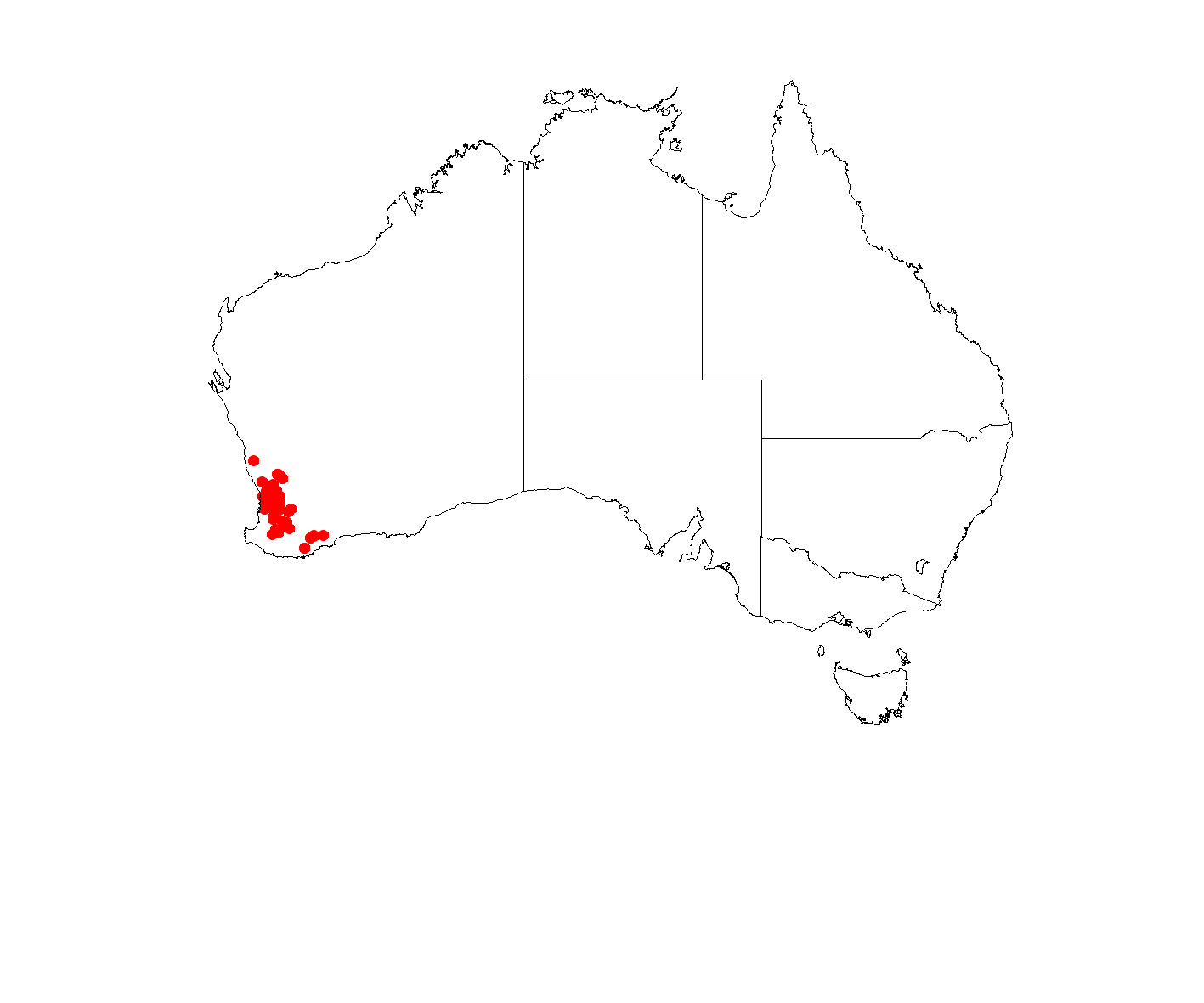
- Occurrence data from AVH

Synonyms
- Lepidosperma leptostachyum var. asperatum Kük.

Species of grass-like plant

Lepidosperma asperatum is a sedge (in the family Cyperaceae) that is endemic to Western Australia. It was first described in 1941 by Georg Kükenthal as Lepidosperma leptostachyum var. asperatum, but was elevated to species status in 2012 by Karen Wilson and Russell Barrett.

== Distribution ==
It is found in the IBRA regions of the Avon Wheatbelt, the Geraldton Sandplains, the Jarrah Forest, the Mallee biogeographic region, and the Swan Coastal Plain.
