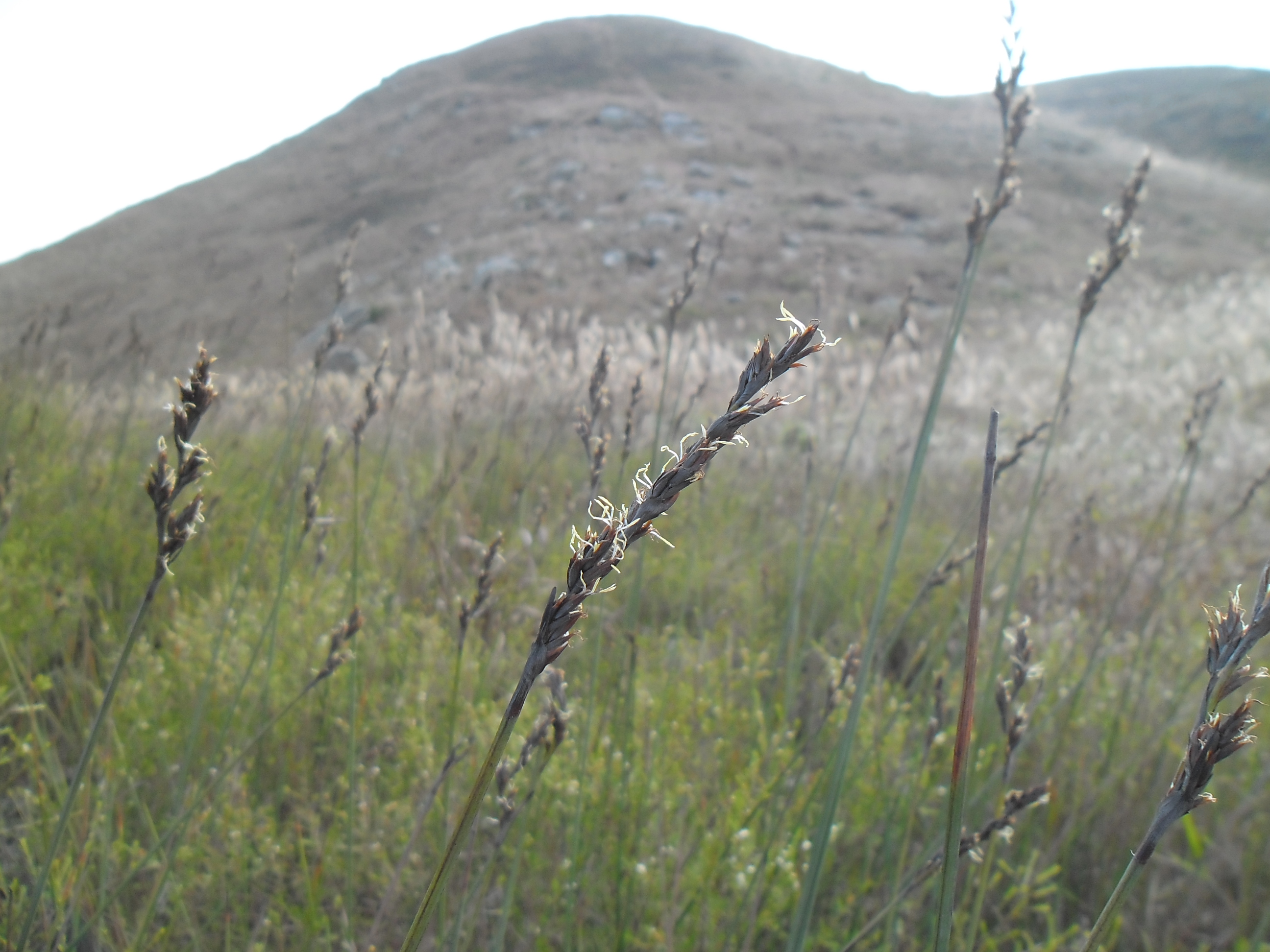
- Lepidosperma chinense, flowering in Pat Sin Leng, Hong Kong.

Scientific classification
- Kingdom: Plantae
- Clade: Tracheophytes
- Clade: Angiosperms
- Clade: Monocots
- Clade: Commelinids
- Order: Poales
- Family: Cyperaceae
- Genus: Lepidosperma
- Species: L. chinense

Binomial name
- Lepidosperma chinense Nees & Meyen ex Kunth

= Lepidosperma chinense =

Chinese scaleseed sedge

Species of grass-like plant

Lepidosperma chinense, also known as the Chinese scaleseed sedge, is a plant widely distributed across Fujian, Guangdong, Guangxi, Hainan, Hunan, Zhejiang, Indonesia, Malaysia, Papua New Guinea, and Vietnam.

It is common in Hong Kong.
