= Lepidosperma benthamianum =

Scientific classification
- Kingdom: Plantae
- Clade: Tracheophytes
- Clade: Angiosperms
- Clade: Monocots
- Clade: Commelinids
- Order: Poales
- Family: Cyperaceae
- Genus: Lepidosperma
- Species: L. benthamianum

Binomial name
- Lepidosperma benthamianum C.B.Clarke

Species of grass-like plant

Lepidosperma benthamianum is a sedge of the family Cyperaceae that is native to Western Australia.

The rhizomatous perennial sedge with a tufted habit typically grows to a height of 0.3 metres (1.0 ft) which blooms between May and October producing brown flowers.

It is found in parts of the northern Wheatbelt region.
