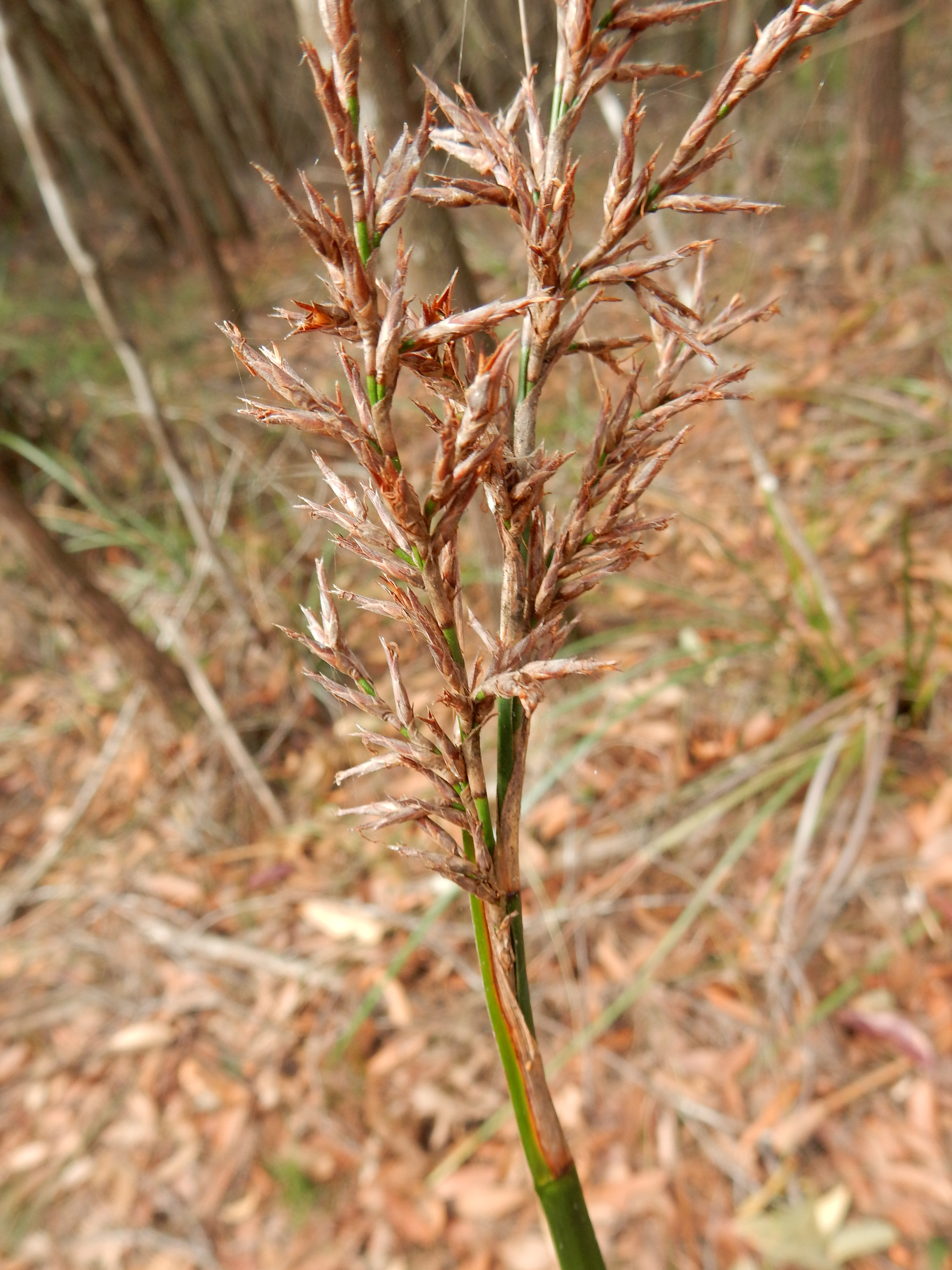

Scientific classification
- Kingdom: Plantae
- Clade: Tracheophytes
- Clade: Angiosperms
- Clade: Monocots
- Clade: Commelinids
- Order: Poales
- Family: Cyperaceae
- Genus: Lepidosperma
- Species: L. sieberi

Binomial name
- Lepidosperma sieberi Kunth
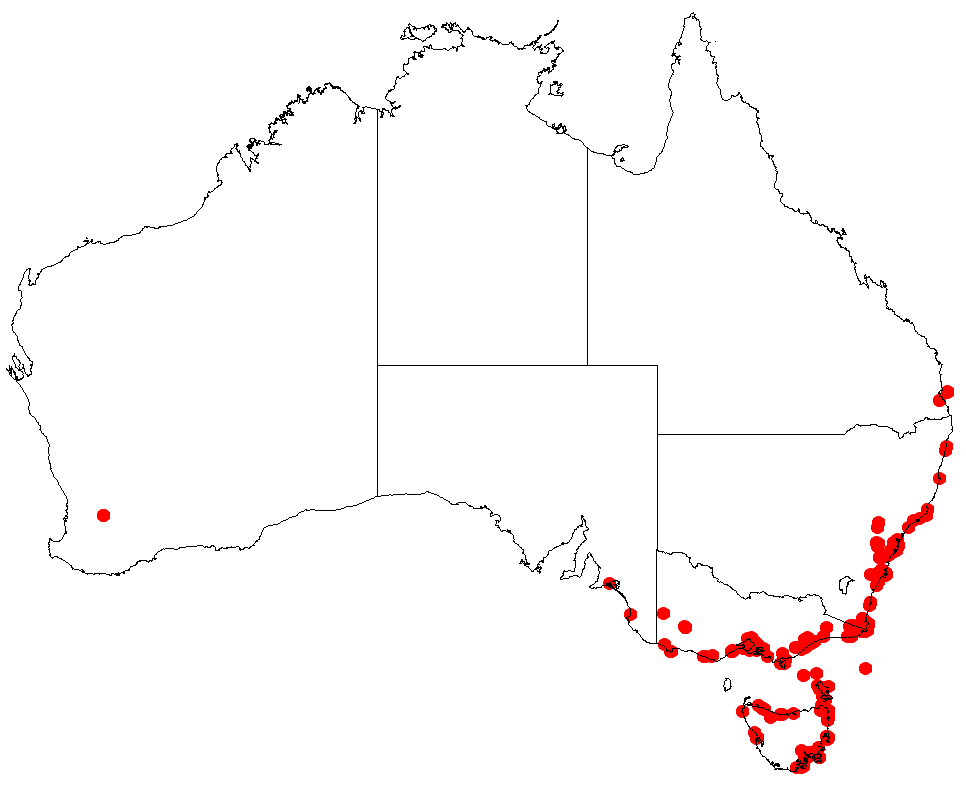
- Occurrence data from AVH

= Lepidosperma sieberi =

saw sedge

Species of plant

Lepidosperma sieberi is a grass-like plant found in southern Australia. Usually seen in heath, forest and woodland, often on moist sandy sites, it may grow to 60 centimetres tall. The specific epithet sieberi honours the botanist and collector Franz Sieber.
