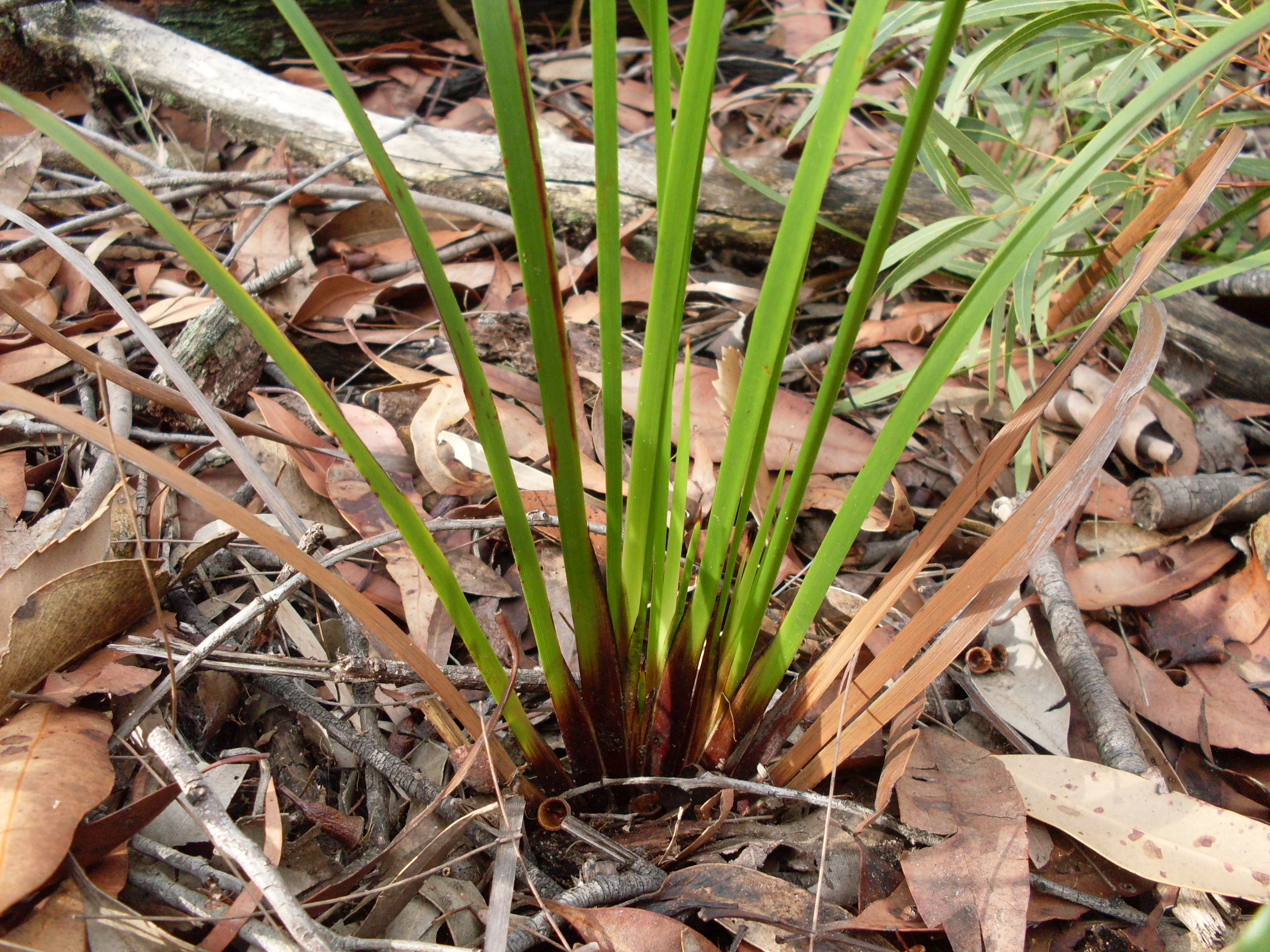

Scientific classification
- Kingdom: Plantae
- Clade: Tracheophytes
- Clade: Angiosperms
- Clade: Monocots
- Clade: Commelinids
- Order: Poales
- Family: Cyperaceae
- Genus: Lepidosperma
- Species: L. viscidum

Binomial name
- Lepidosperma viscidum R.Br.
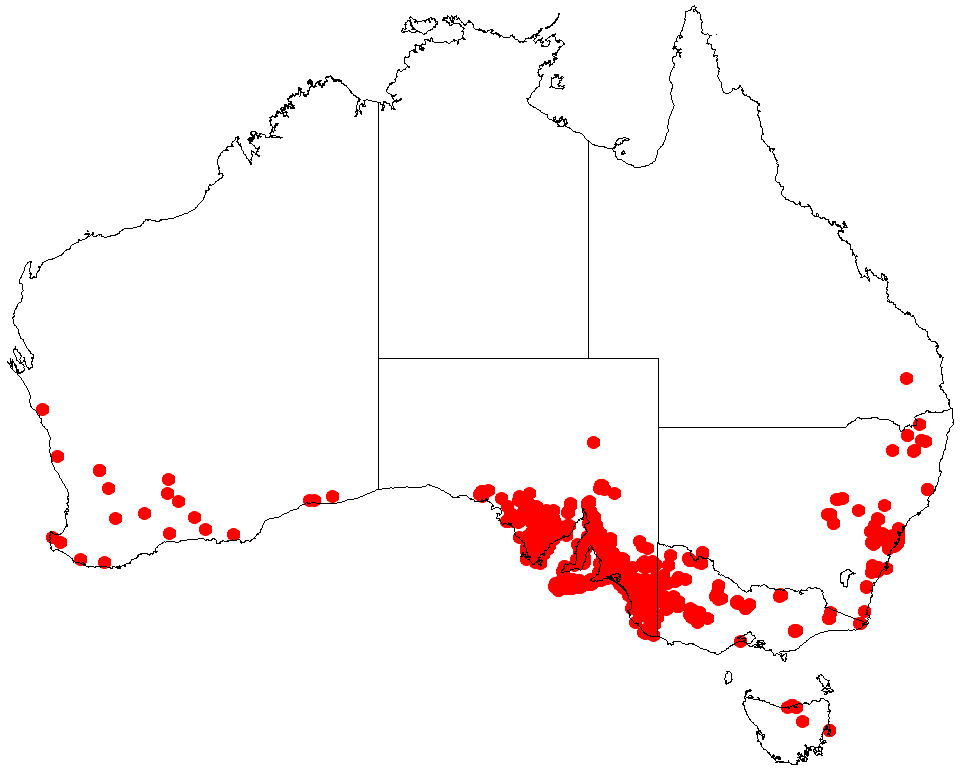
- Occurrence data from AVH

= Lepidosperma viscidum =

sticky saw sedge

Species of plant

Lepidosperma viscidum, the sticky saw sedge, is a grass-like plant found in south eastern Australia. Usually seen in heath and woodland on sandy and rocky sites, it may grow to 60 centimetres high. This is one of the many plants first published by Robert Brown with the type known as "(M.) v.v." appearing in his Prodromus Florae Novae Hollandiae et Insulae Van Diemen in 1810. The specific epithet viscidum is derived from the Latin with a meaning of "sticky", which refers to the sticky resin from the base and margins of the leaves and stem margins. On drying, the resin turns a red colour.
