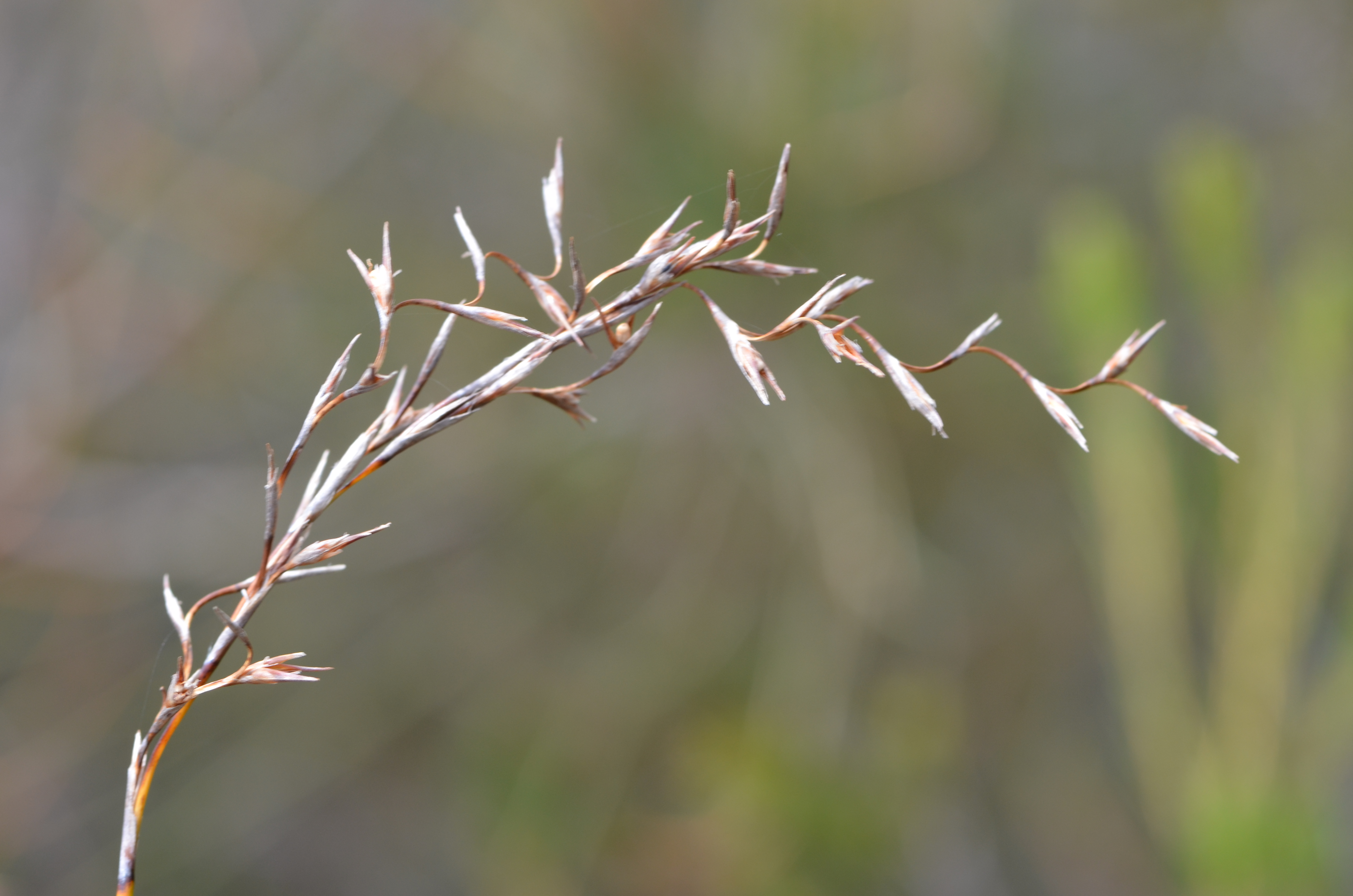

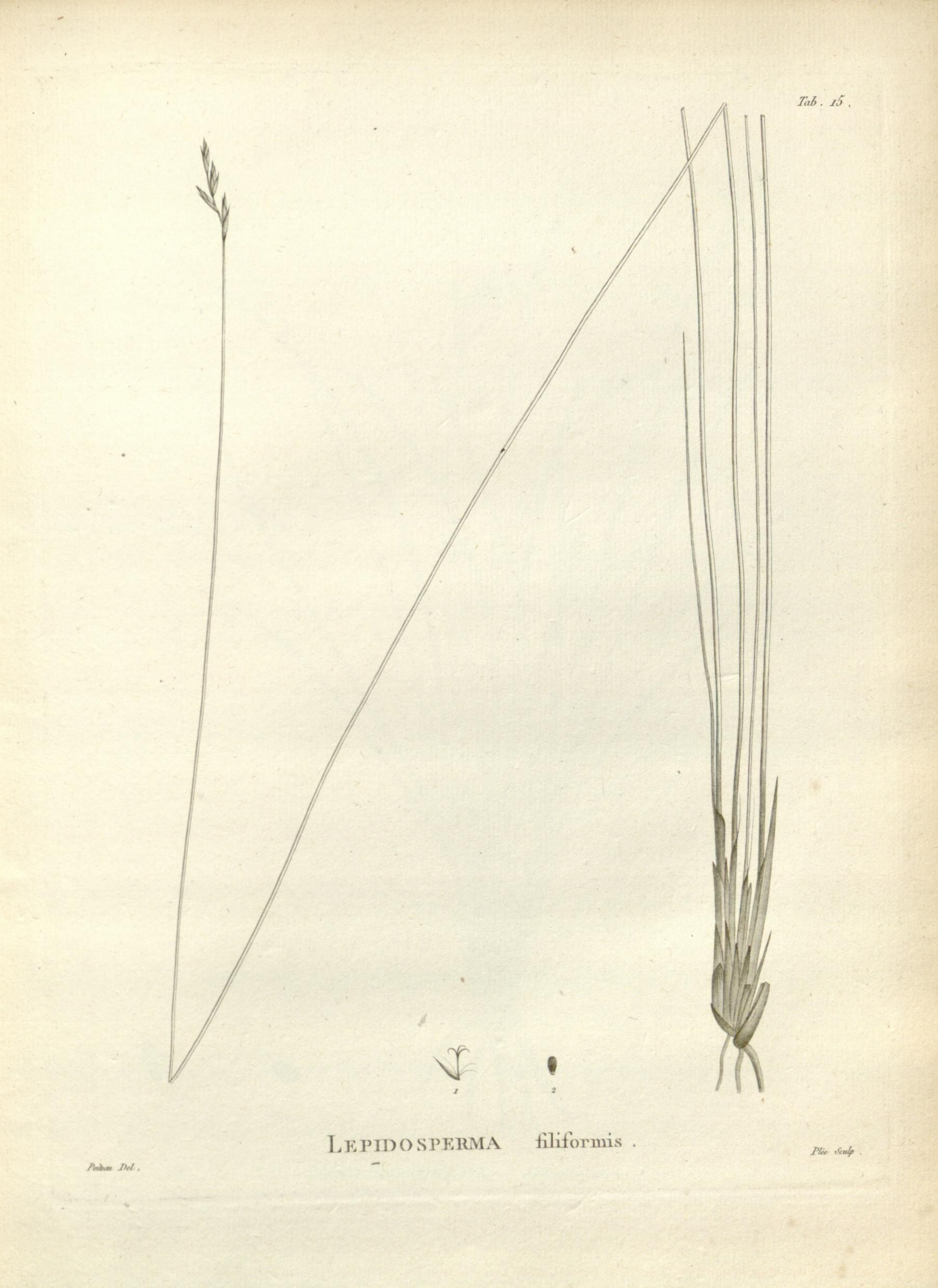
- (Labillardière, Tab 15)

Scientific classification
- Kingdom: Plantae
- Clade: Tracheophytes
- Clade: Angiosperms
- Clade: Monocots
- Clade: Commelinids
- Order: Poales
- Family: Cyperaceae
- Genus: Lepidosperma
- Species: L. filiforme

Binomial name
- Lepidosperma filiforme Labill.
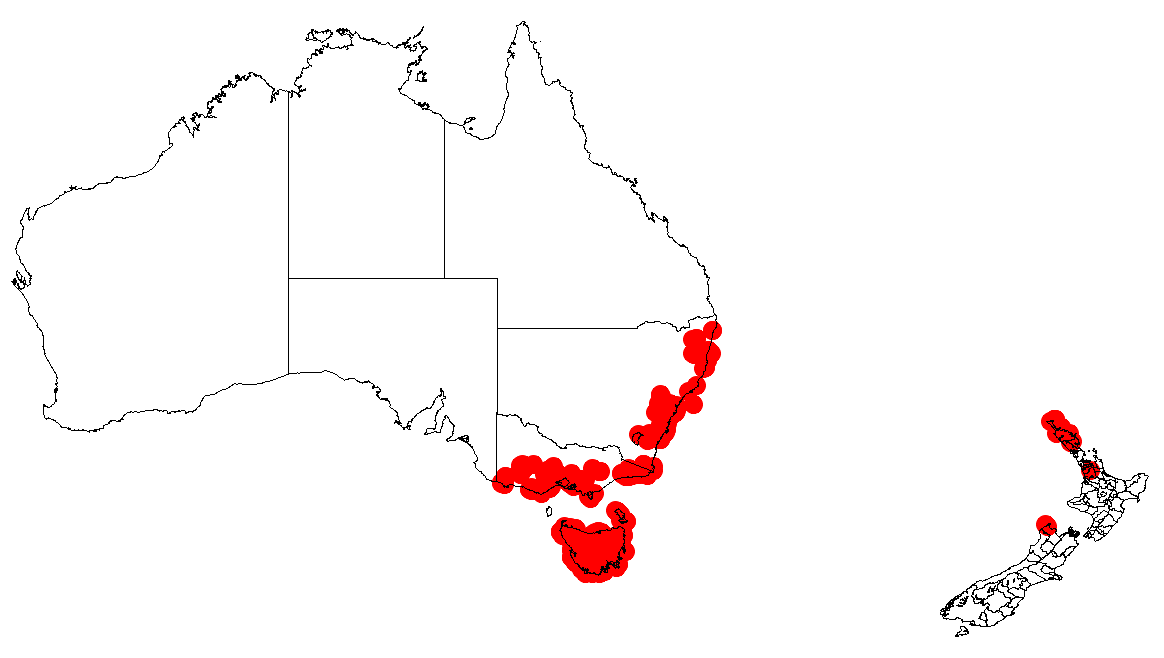
- Occurrence data from AVH

= Lepidosperma filiforme =

Common rapier-sedge

Species of grass-like plant

Lepidosperma filiforme, also known as the common rapier-sedge, is a sedge that occurs in coastal regions of south-eastern Australia and New Zealand. Plants grow to between 0.3 and 1 metre high. The culms are smooth, rigid, terete and between 0.7 and 2 mm in diameter. The leaves are also terete and about 1 mm in diameter, with sheaths that are straw coloured or reddish.

The species was formally described in 1805 by French botanist Jacques Labillardière in 1805 based on plant material collected from Tasmania.
