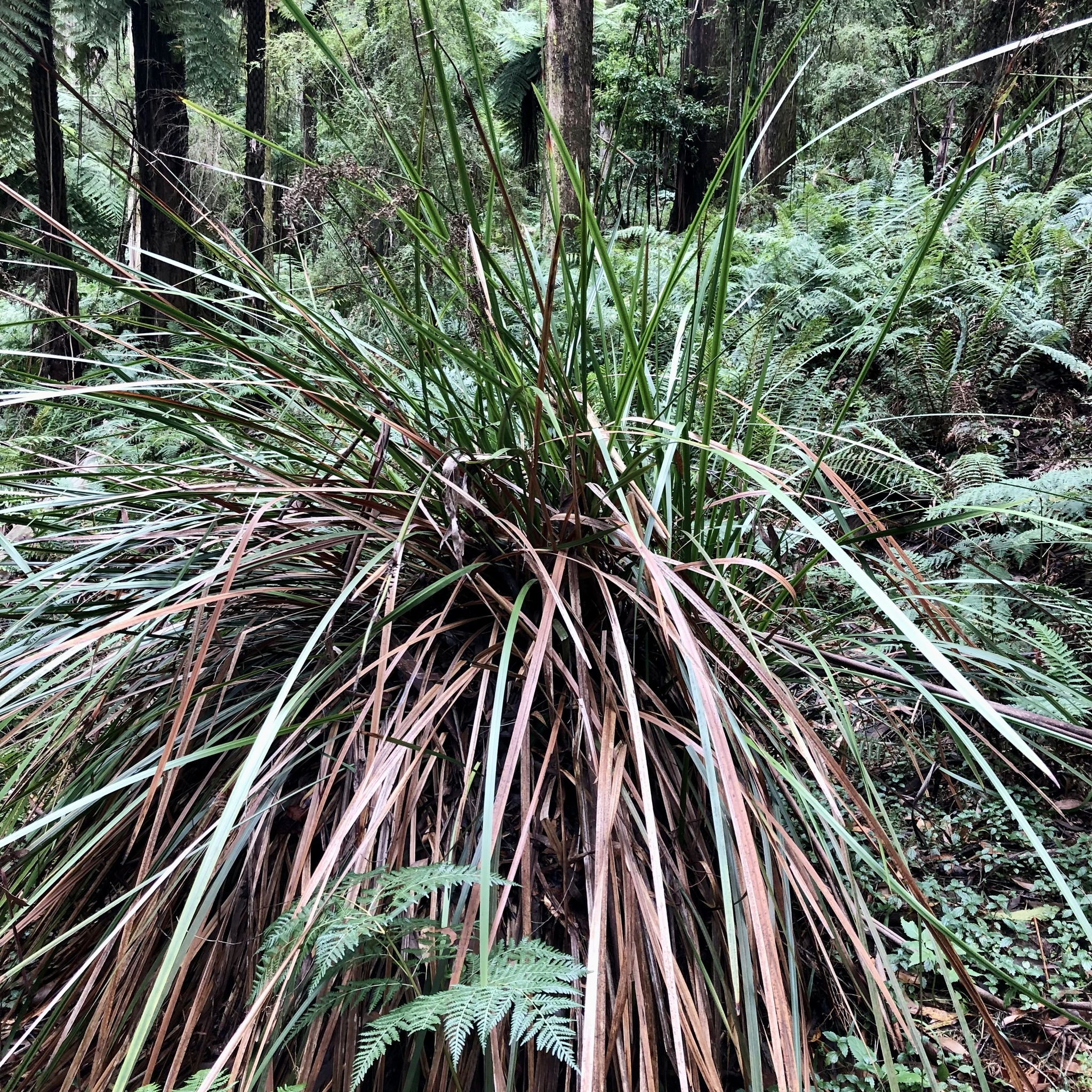

Scientific classification
- Kingdom: Plantae
- Clade: Tracheophytes
- Clade: Angiosperms
- Clade: Monocots
- Clade: Commelinids
- Order: Poales
- Family: Cyperaceae
- Genus: Lepidosperma
- Species: L. elatius

Binomial name
- Lepidosperma elatius Labill.
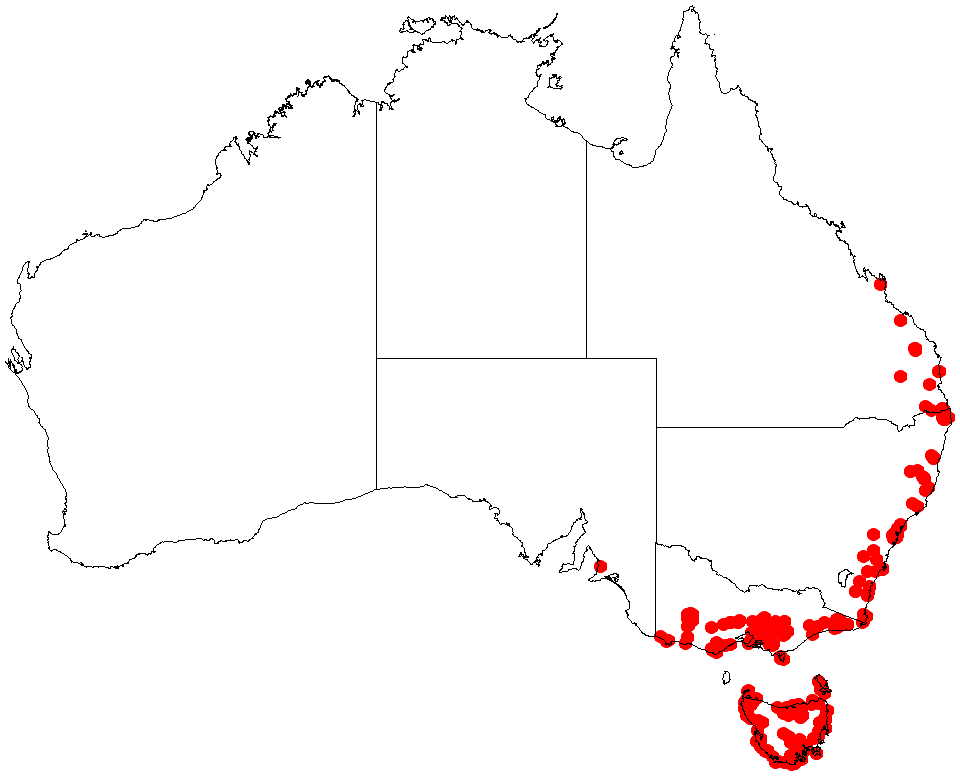
- Occurrence data from AVH

= Lepidosperma elatius =

Species of grass-like plant

Lepidosperma elatius is a species of plant from the sedge family that can be found in Australia (in New South Wales, Victoria, Queensland and Tasmania). The plant grows to a height of 1–2.5 metres (3 ft 3 in – 8 ft 2 in), with leaves 5–15 millimetres (0.20–0.59 in) in width, and which are convex on both sides, with sharp margins. The spikelets have a drooping spray with a length of 18–65 centimetres (7.1–25.6 in). The plant flowers from November to April.
