= Lepidosperma leptostachyum =

Scientific classification
- Kingdom: Plantae
- Clade: Tracheophytes
- Clade: Angiosperms
- Clade: Monocots
- Clade: Commelinids
- Order: Poales
- Family: Cyperaceae
- Genus: Lepidosperma
- Species: L. leptostachyum

Binomial name
- Lepidosperma leptostachyum Benth.
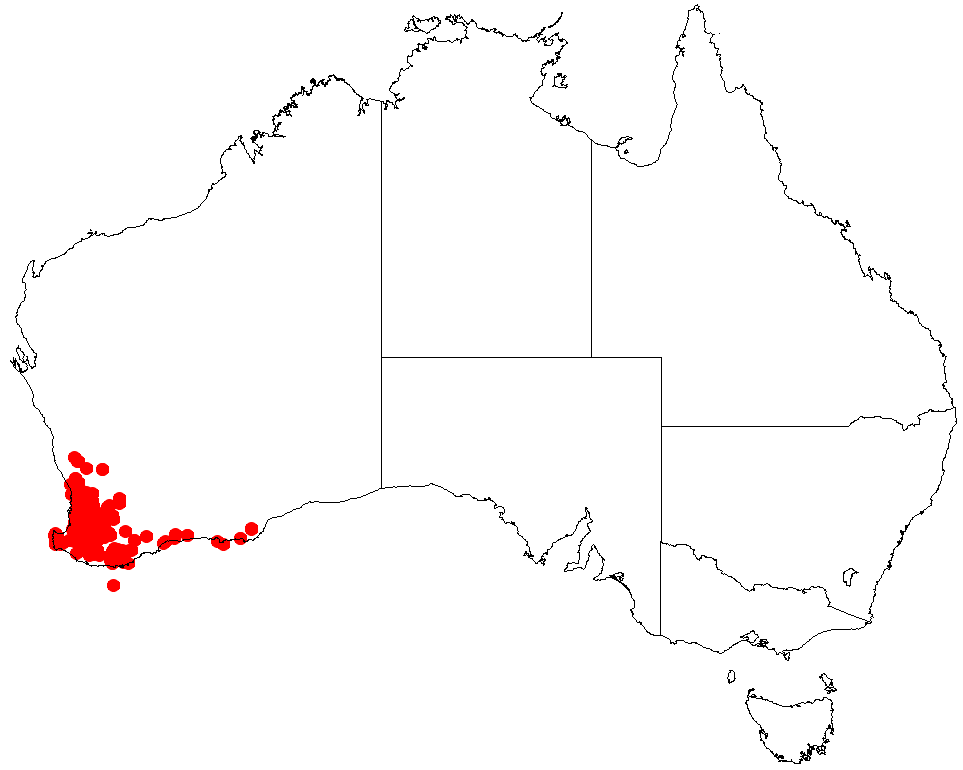
- Occurrence data from AVH

Species of grass-like plant

Lepidosperma leptostachyum is a species of flowering plant in the sedge family, Cyperaceae, a native of Southwest Australia.

== Taxonomy ==
The first description was given in an 1878 monograph by George Bentham, published in the Flora of Australia series.

The diversity of the genus Lepidosperma has been the subject of frequent revision, and a variety of this species is recognised, Lepidosperma leptostachyum var. asperatum Kük. The name has been applied to populations later recognised as a new species, Lepidosperma apricola R.L. Barrett, in 2013.

== Description ==
Lepidosperma leptostachyum is herbaceous or grass-like in form, growing as clumps around 600 millimetres across. The height is an equivalent size or as low as 100 mm, the plant may be up to 1 metre in height. The brownish inflorescence appears from April to June.

== Distribution and habitat ==
The species is found in the Southwest Australia region, in a variety of soil types. They occur on slopes, on black and grey sands, lateritic and peaty soils, or clay, and on gravel.

The conservation status of L. leptostachyum is noted at FloraBase as not threatened.
