= Swan Coastal Plain Shrublands and Woodlands =

Indigenous woodland community in Perth, Australia

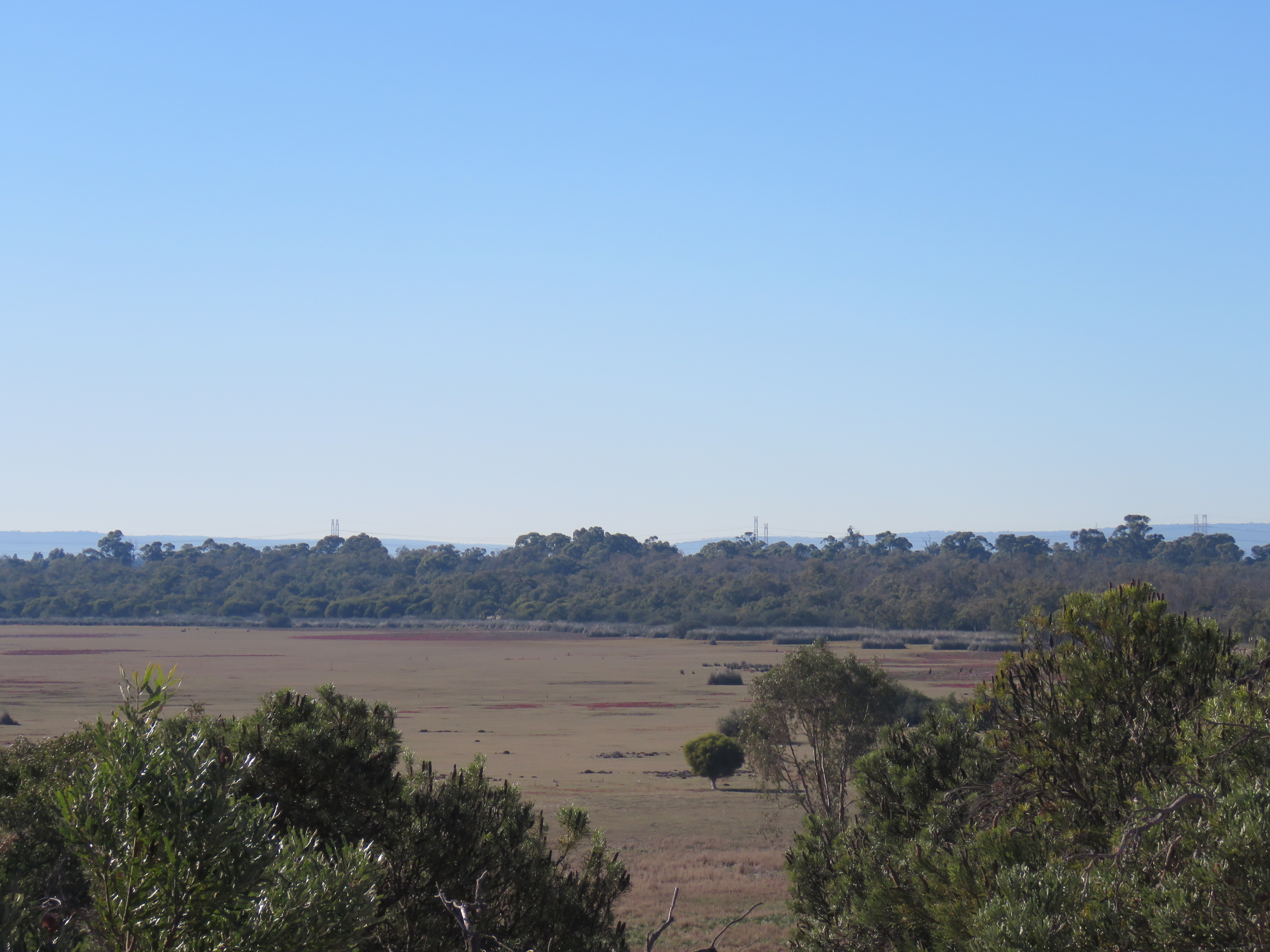
- Beeliar Regional Park

Ecology
- Realm: Australasia
- Biome: Mediterranean forests, woodlands, and scrub
- Borders: Banksia Woodlands of the Swan Coastal Plain; Jarrah Forest

Geography
- Country: Australia
- Elevation: 60–70 metres (200–230 ft)
- Coordinates: 31.51°S 115.91°E
- Geology: Ironstone
- Climate type: Mediterranean climate (Csa)
- Soil types: Clay, sand, loam

The Swan Coastal Plain Shrublands and Woodlands is a sclerophyll-woodland vegetation community that stretch from Kalbarri in the north to Busselton in the south, passing through Perth, in Western Australia. Situated on the Swan Coastal Plain, it is listed as Endangered under the Commonwealth Environment Protection and Biodiversity Conservation Act 1999. The woodlands also incorporate Perth–Gingin Shrublands and Woodlands.

== Geography ==
The community sits on poorly drained plains with greyish sandy benches and disjunctive swamps, in addition to areas that lie on bog iron ore, marl or solonetz soils, and as well as heavy clay soils. The Perth–Gingin Shrublands and Woodlands are located on inundated ironstone and heavy clay soils. The community occurs at parts near Kalbarri, City of Swan, City of Gosnells, Eneabba, the Perth area, at Gingin and Busselton and in the Scott River area, even though 97% of it is cleared.

== Ecology ==
Native species include shrubs and small trees such as Melaleuca viminea, Grevillea curviloba, Kunzea recurva, Grevillea evanescens, Dryandra sessilis, Acacia saligna, Jacksonia furcellata, with Rhodanthe spp, being in the understorey, and the herbs Rhodanthe manglesii and Tribonanthes australis.

Other species in the community include Banksia attenuata, Banksia menziesii, sometimes with Allocasuarina fraseriana with a shrub layer that may include Adenanthos cygnorum, Hibbertia huegelii, Scaevola repens, Allocasuarina humilis, Bossiaea eriocarpa, Hibbertia hypericoides and Stirlingia latifolia. Herbs and forbs include Conostylis aurea, Burchardia congesta and Patersonia occidentalis.
