= Banksia Woodlands of the Swan Coastal Plain =

Indigenous woodland community in Western Australia

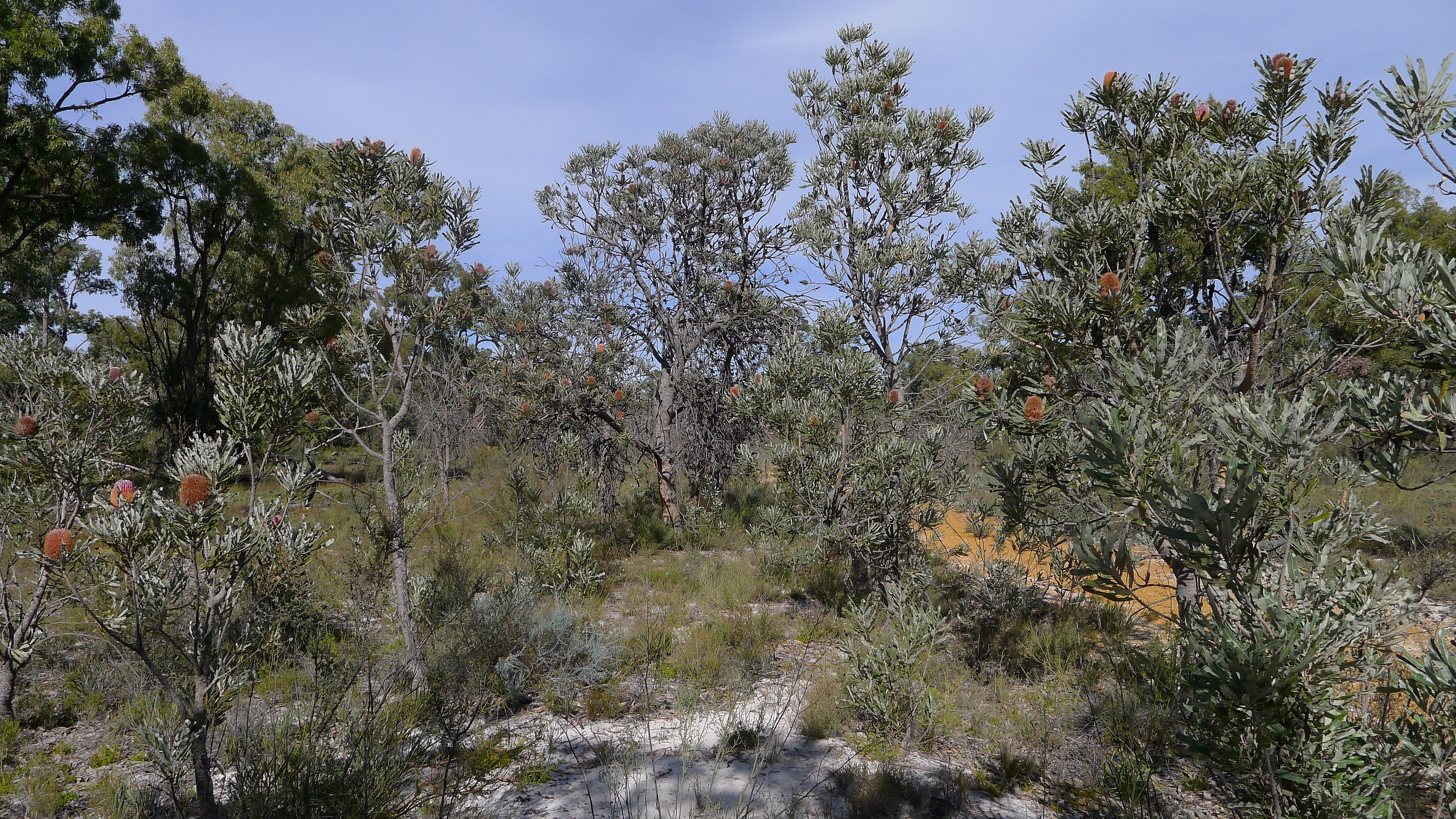

Ecology
- Realm: Australasia
- Biome: Mediterranean forests, woodlands, and scrub
- Borders: Swan Coastal Plain Shrublands and Woodlands; Jarrah Forest

Geography
- Area: 0.016 km^{2} (0.0062 sq mi)
- Country: Australia
- Elevation: 10–50 metres (33–164 ft)
- Coordinates: 31.51°S 115.61°E
- Climate type: Mediterranean climate (Csa)
- Soil types: Sand

The Banksia Woodlands of the Swan Coastal Plain is a protected sclerophyll community situated in the Swan Coastal Plain, Western Australia that predominantly consists of banksias. Listed as endangered under the Environment Protection and Biodiversity Conservation Act 1999, it was once a near-incessant band of large shrub patches around Perth and other nearby coastal areas.

== Geography ==
The woodland is associated with the Swan Coastal Plain (and a few neighbouring areas) of southwest Western Australia on well drained, poor nutrient soils in dune landforms, especially deep Bassendean and Spearwood sands, or at times on Quindalup sand. It is also common on sandy colluvium and aeolian sand. Before the 19th century, they had a size estimated at 146 hectare, but since then the area has been significantly cleared for farming, housing and related infrastructure, and now 60% of the banksia woodland is lost with small patches remaining.

Today, the woodlands assist with cooling down temperatures in the encompassing region; collect carbon; filter and keep aquifers (such as drinking water for Perth), in addition to extenuating local flooding, damaging winds, soil loss, and pollution. They also provide amenity and recreation, as they feature scenic areas for bushwalking.

== Ecology ==
Banksia species dominate the vegetation community; Banksia attenuata, Banksia littoralis, Banksia menziesii, Banksia prionotes an Banksia ilicifolia. Secondary tree species can be present, such as, Eucalyptus todtiana, Nuytsia floribunda, Allocasuarina fraseriana, Callitris arenaria, Callitris pyramidalis, Corymbia calophylla, Eucalyptus gomphocephala, Eucalyptus marginata and Xylomelum occidentale.

Shrubs include Adenanthos cygnorum, Allocasuarina humilis, Bossiaea eriocarpa, Conostephium pendulum, Eremaea pauciflora, Gompholobium tomentosum, Hibbertia hypericoides, Kunzea glabrescens, Petrophile linearis, Phlebocarya ciliata, Philotheca spicata, Stirlingia latifolia and Xanthorrhoea preissii.

=== Fauna ===
This ecological community provides habitats for many nationally threatened native animals including; Dasyurus geoffroii, Calyptorhynchus latirostris, Calyptorhynchus banksii, and several species of native bees.
