= Milkmaid (disambiguation) =

Historically, a milkmaid was a woman who milked cows and supplied milk.

Milkmaid may also refer to:

- Milkmaid (horse), a racehorse
- The Milkmaid (1953 film) (Hilja maitotyttö), a Finnish film
- The Milkmaid (film), a 2020 Nigerian film
- The Milkmaid (Vermeer), a painting by Johannes Vermeer
- The Milkmaid of Bordeaux, a painting by Francisco Goya
- Burchardia umbellata, an herb of native woodlands and heath from southern Australia
- Cardamine californica, a flowering plant in the family Brassicaceae, native to California
- Nestlé Milkmaid (La Lechera in Spanish, Leite Moça in Portuguese), a dairy product brand by Nestlé
