= Stirlingia seselifolia =

Scientific classification
- Kingdom: Plantae
- Clade: Tracheophytes
- Clade: Angiosperms
- Clade: Eudicots
- Order: Proteales
- Family: Proteaceae
- Genus: Stirlingia
- Species: S. seselifolia

Binomial name
- Stirlingia seselifolia Domin

Species of Australian plant in the family Proteaceae

Stirlingia seselifolia is a herb or shrub endemic to Western Australia.

The erect perennial herb or shrub typically grows to a height of 0.3 to 1 metre (1.0 to 3.3 ft). It blooms between September and October producing yellow-cream-brown flowers.

It is found on low-lying areas in the South West and Great Southern regions of Western Australia where it grows in sandy soils over laterite.
