= Stirlingia tenuifolia =

Scientific classification
- Kingdom: Plantae
- Clade: Tracheophytes
- Clade: Angiosperms
- Clade: Eudicots
- Order: Proteales
- Family: Proteaceae
- Genus: Stirlingia
- Species: S. tenuifolia

Binomial name
- Stirlingia tenuifolia (R.Br.) Steud.

Species of Australian plant in the family Proteaceae

Stirlingia tenuifolia is a herb or shrub endemic to Western Australia.

The erect perennial herb or shrub typically grows to a height of 0.25 to 1.5 metres (0.8 to 4.9 ft). It blooms between September and November producing yellow-cream flowers.

It is found on dunes, sand plains, swamps and hillsides in the South West, Great Southern and Goldfields-Esperanceregions of Western Australia where it grows in sandy-gravelly soils.
