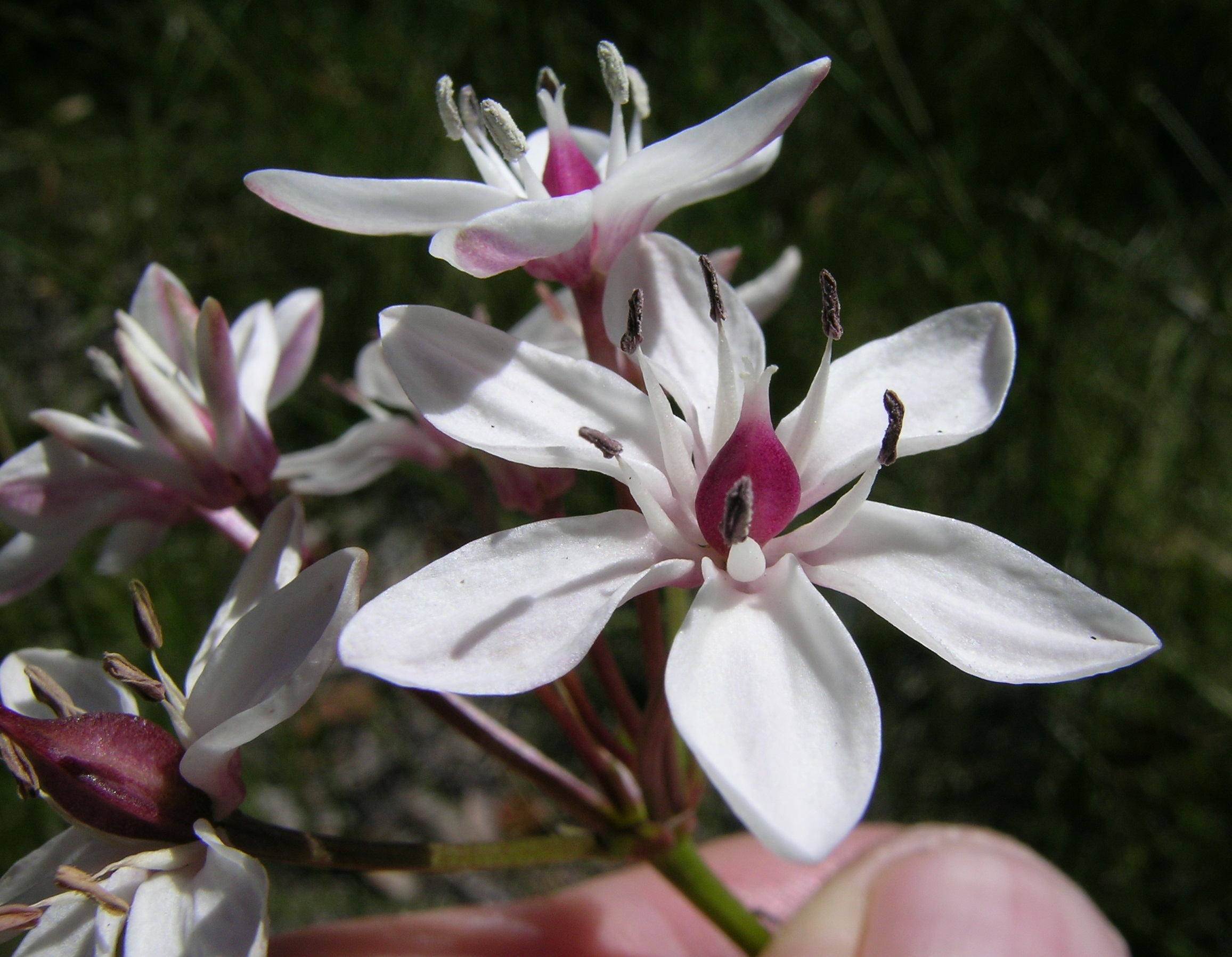
- Burchardia umbellata

Scientific classification
- Kingdom: Plantae
- Clade: Embryophytes
- Clade: Tracheophytes
- Clade: Spermatophytes
- Clade: Angiosperms
- Clade: Monocots
- Order: Liliales
- Family: Colchicaceae
- Genus: Burchardia; R.Br.

Synonyms
- Burckhardia T.Post & Kuntze, spelling variant; Reya Kuntze

= Burchardia =

Genus of flowering plants

Burchardia is a genus of herbs that are endemic to Australia. The genus is named for Johann Heinrich Burkhardt, a German botanist.

Species

- Burchardia bairdiae Keighery
- Burchardia congesta Lindl.
- Burchardia monantha Domin
- Burchardia multiflora Lindl.
- Burchardia rosea Keighery
- Burchardia umbellata R.Br. (milkmaids)

The last of these occurs in Tasmania, South Australia, Victoria, New South Wales and Queensland; the other five are endemic to Western Australia.
