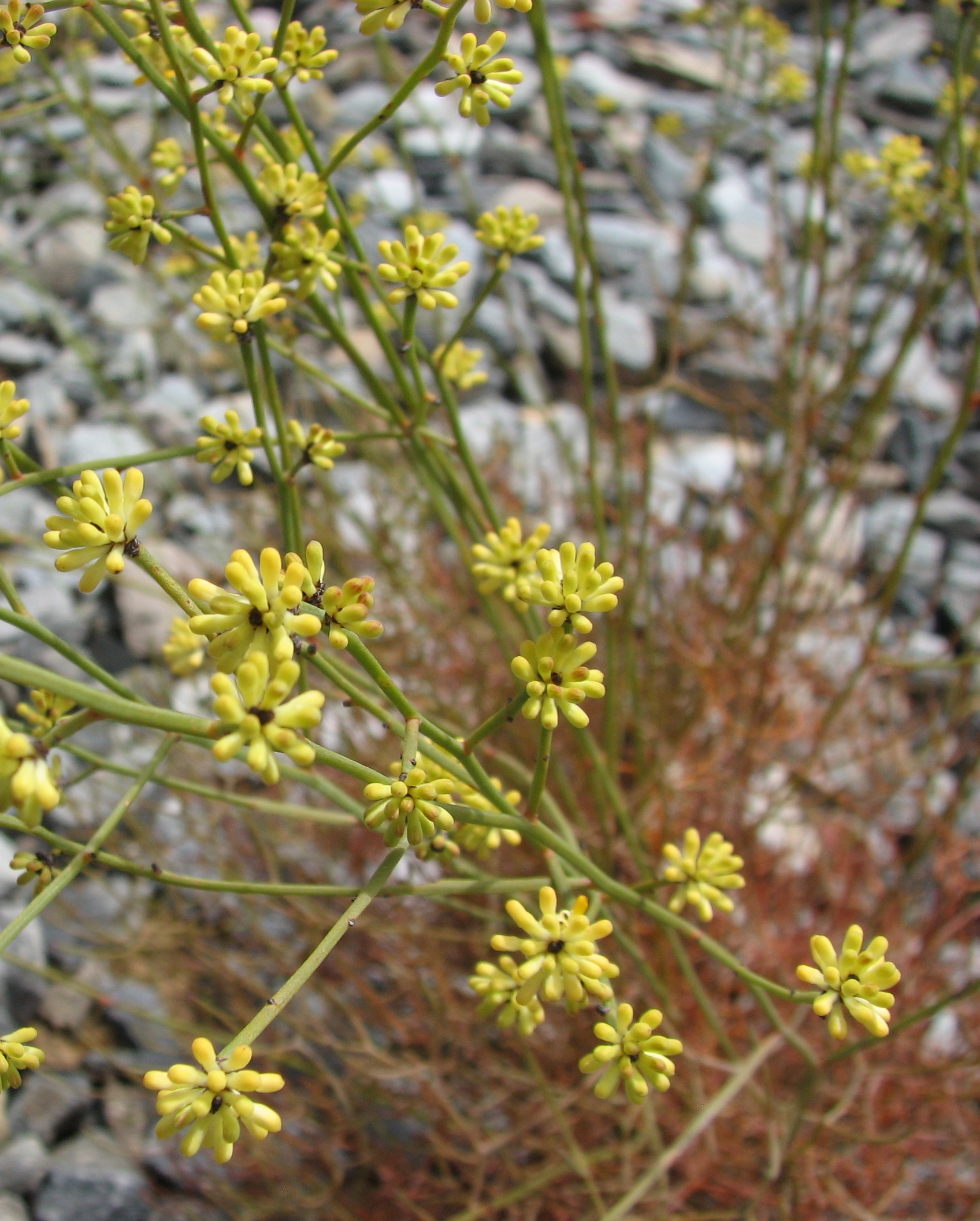

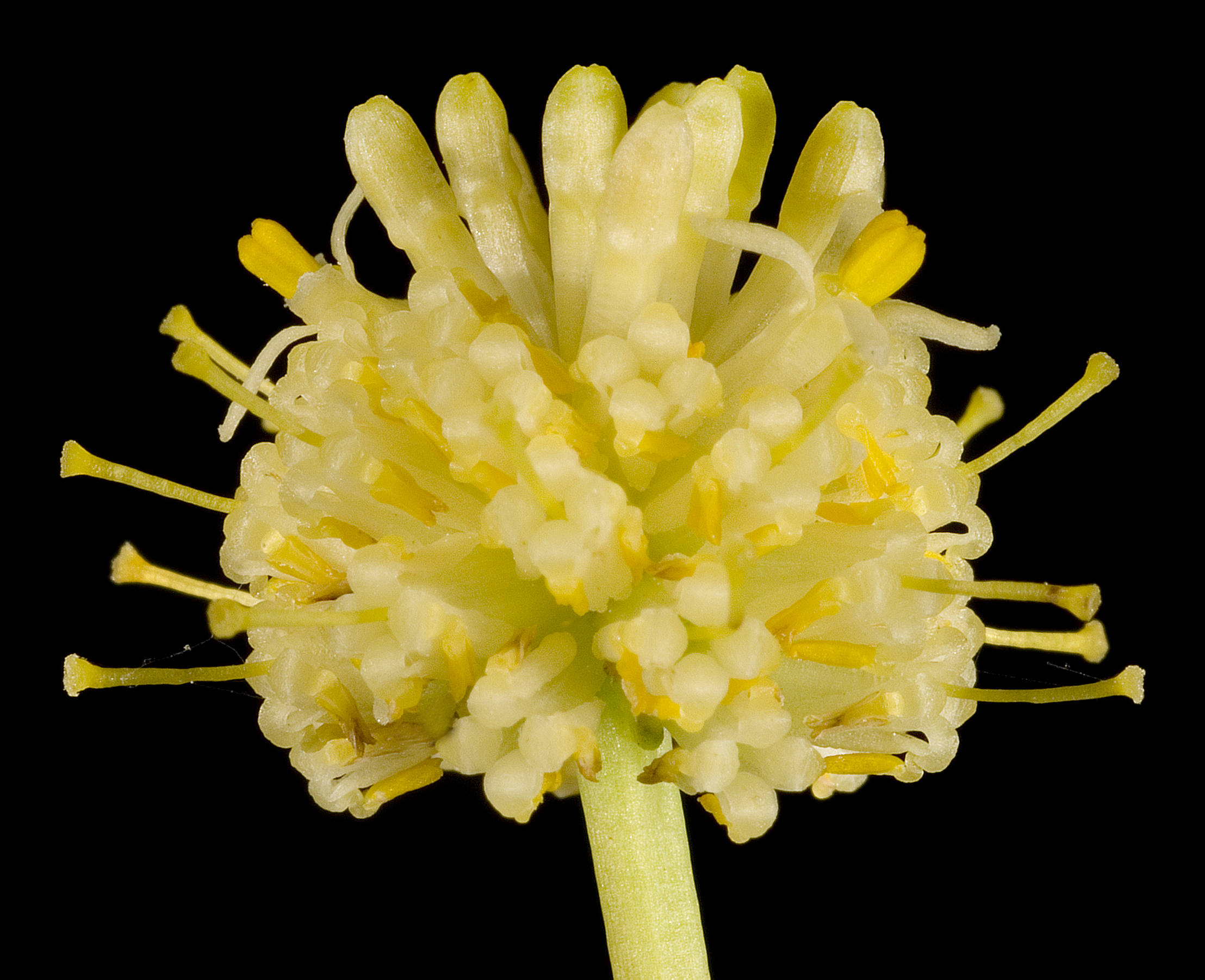

Scientific classification
- Kingdom: Plantae
- Clade: Tracheophytes
- Clade: Angiosperms
- Clade: Eudicots
- Order: Proteales
- Family: Proteaceae
- Genus: Stirlingia
- Species: S. simplex

Binomial name
- Stirlingia simplex Lindl.

= Stirlingia simplex =

Species of plant native to Australia

Stirlingia simplex is a species of flowering plant in the family Proteaceae. It is endemic to Western Australia.

== Description ==
A woody perennial, S. simplex can grow as a shrub or as suckering herb with short-lived stems arising from a perennial rootstock. Stems may be up to 10 centimetres (3.9 in) long, and the plant as a whole grows to a height of 10 to 60 centimetres (4 to 24 in), rarely to 1 metre (3 ft 3 in). It has soft leaves that bifurcate repeatedly into lobes, with the final lobes measuring from 2 to 20 millimetres (0.079 to 0.79 in) long. Flowers are cream or yellow, and occur in dense heads from 10 to 15 millimetres (0.39 to 0.59 in) in diameter, atop scapes up to 60 centimetres (24 in) tall.

== Taxonomy ==
The species was first published by John Lindley in his 1839 A Sketch of the Vegetation of the Swan River Colony, based on unspecified material. Lindley commented that it "resembles a Sanicula".

Since that time, it has had a fairly straightforward taxonomic history. It has only two synonyms:

- Carl Meissner published S. capillifolia in 1855, but this was declared a taxonomic synonym of S. simplex by Alex George in 1995.
- In 1884 Ferdinand von Mueller proposed to transfer Stirlingia to Simsia, the original, albeit illegal, name for the genus. His transfer was not accepted, and Simsia simplex is now a nomenclatural synonym of Stirlingia simplex.

== Distribution and habitat ==
It occurs throughout much of the Southwest Botanic Province of Western Australia, from Eneabba in the north, south to Waroona and east to Hyden. It grows in a variety of soils, amongst proteaceous-myrtaceous heath and eucalypt woodland, and prefers seasonally wet areas.

== Ecology ==
It is not considered threatened.
