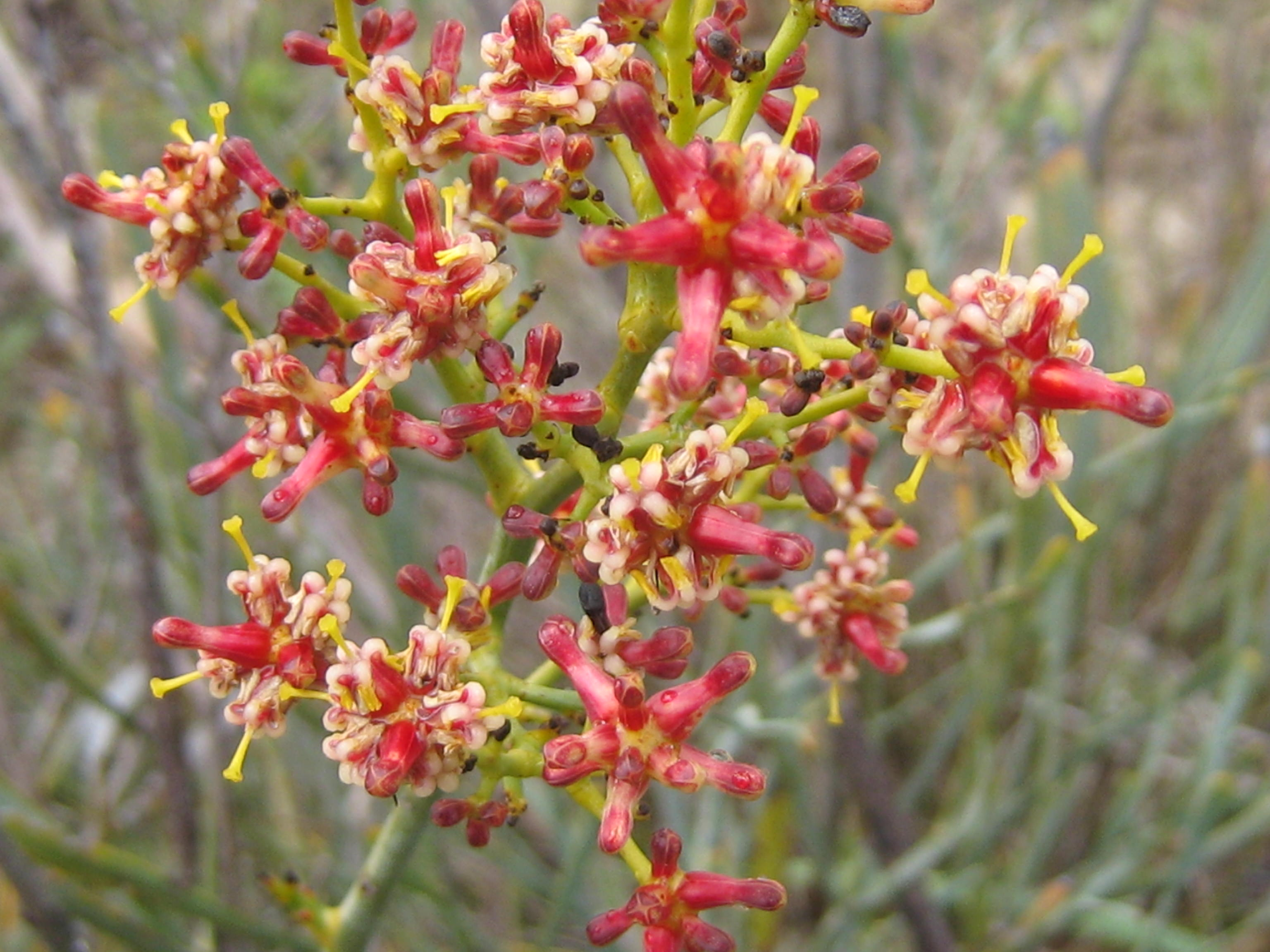
- Stirlingia latifolia flowering

Scientific classification
- Kingdom: Plantae
- Clade: Tracheophytes
- Clade: Angiosperms
- Clade: Eudicots
- Order: Proteales
- Family: Proteaceae
- Subfamily: Proteoideae
- Tribe: Conospermeae
- Subtribe: Stirlingiinae; L.A.S.Johnson & B.G.Briggs
- Genus: Stirlingia; Endl.

Species
- 7 species; see text.

= Stirlingia =

Blueboy

Genus of plants native to Australia

Stirlingia, commonly known as blueboy, is a genus of 7 species in the family Proteaceae, all of which are endemic to Western Australia.

== Description ==
Stirlingia grows as a shrub or herb arising from a perennial tap root or woody root stock; the herbaceous nature of some species is unique to Stirlingia among the Proteaceae. They grow to heights ranging from 10 centimetres (3.9 in) to 1.5 metres (4 ft 11 in). Leaves are soft and leathery, and bifurcated along their length. They occur mostly on lower parts of the stems. Flowers occur in inflorescences that are either heads or very short spikes.

== Taxonomy ==
The genus was first published by Robert Brown in 1810, under the name Simsia. Brown initially published two species, Simsia anethifolia and Simsia tenuifolia, adding a third, Simsia latifolia in 1830. It was later discovered that Brown's generic name was illegal, as the name Simsia had already been published in 1807 by Christian Hendrik Persoon. Therefore, in 1838 Stephan Endlicher published a new name for the genus. He chose the name Stirlingia, in honour of James Stirling, explorer of the Swan River and first Governor of Western Australia.

Despite publishing a new name for the genus, Endlicher omitted to formally transfer Brown's three species. In 1838, John Lindley published two more names, Stirlingia paniculata and Stirlingia simplex. Two years later Endlicher transferred Simsia anethifolia to Stirlingia anethifolia, and Ernst Steudel transferred the other two of Brown's species, as Stirlingia latifolia and Stirlingia tenuifolia.

Two more species, Stirlingia abrotanoides and Stirlingia teretifolia, were published by Carl Meissner in 1845. In 1848, some confusion was caused by an orthographic error in a work of Endlicher's, referring to Stirlingia anethifolia as Stirlingia acutifolia. Also that year, Meissner published an eighth species, Stirlingia affinis. He continued to publish new species publishing Stirlingia capillifolia in 1855, and Stirlingia intricata in 1856.

In 1870, George Bentham published a treatment of the Stirlingia in his Flora Australiensis, reducing the number of species to five, plus one variety: S. simplex, S. abrotanoides, S. teretifolia, S. tenuifolia, S. tenuifolia var. anethifolia, and S. latifolia. Fourteen years later, Ferdinand von Mueller somewhat disrupted the nomenclature of the genus by proposing to revert to the name Simsia, publishing Simsia abrotanoides, Simsia teretifolia and Simsia simplex for the first time. This was accepted as late as 1921, when Carl Ostenfeld published a further variety under Simsia, Simsia latifolia var. gracilis. In 1923, however, Karel Domin published a new species under Stirlingia as Stirlingia seselifolia.

In 1995, Alex George published a thorough treatment of the Stirlingia for the Flora of Australia series of monographs. He reduced numerous names to synonymy, and published a further new species, Stirlingia divaricatissima.

== Species ==
Seven species are currently recognised:

Image	Scientific name	Distribution
	Stirlingia abrotanoides	Wheatbelt region of Western Australia.
	Stirlingia anethifolia	Western Australia
	Stirlingia divaricatissima	Western Australia
	Stirlingia latifolia	Southwest Botanical Province, ranging from Kalbarri in the north, south to Albany
	Stirlingia seselifolia	South West and Great Southern regions of Western Australia
	Stirlingia simplex	Southwest Botanic Province of Western Australia
	Stirlingia tenuifolia	Western Australia

No infrageneric arrangement has been proffered.

This genus is placed alone in subtribe Stirlingiinae, within the tribe Conospermeae of the subfamily Proteoideae.

The common name Blueboy is used sometimes for the genus, but most often refers to the species S. latifolia. The name comes from the fact that wall plaster turns blue if made using sand taken from where S. latifolia occurs.

== Distribution and habitat ==
They are endemic to the Southwest Botanical Province of Western Australia. They occur in a range of soil types, including sand, clay, and laterite; most species prefer low-lying areas that are seasonally wet.

== Ecology ==
Although none of the species are declared rare, S. divaricatissima has been declared "Priority Three - Poorly Known Taxa" on the Department of Environment and Conservation's Declared Rare and Priority Flora List.
