= Stirlingia divaricatissima =

Conservation status
- Priority Three — Poorly Known Taxa (DEC)

Scientific classification
- Kingdom: Plantae
- Clade: Tracheophytes
- Clade: Angiosperms
- Clade: Eudicots
- Order: Proteales
- Family: Proteaceae
- Genus: Stirlingia
- Species: S. divaricatissima

Binomial name
- Stirlingia divaricatissima A.S.George

Species of Australian shrub in the family Proteaceae

Stirlingia divaricatissima is a shrub endemic to Western Australia.

The non-lignotuberous shrub typically grows to a height of 1.7 metres (5.6 ft). It blooms in October producing yellow flowers.

It is found on wet depressions in the Great Southern region of Western Australia where it grows in sandy-clay soils.
