= Stirlingia abrotanoides =

Scientific classification
- Kingdom: Plantae
- Clade: Tracheophytes
- Clade: Angiosperms
- Clade: Eudicots
- Order: Proteales
- Family: Proteaceae
- Genus: Stirlingia
- Species: S. abrotanoides

Binomial name
- Stirlingia abrotanoides Meisn.

Species of plant native to Australia

Stirlingia abrotanoides is a herb or shrub of the genus Stirlingia endemic to the Wheatbelt region of Western Australia.
