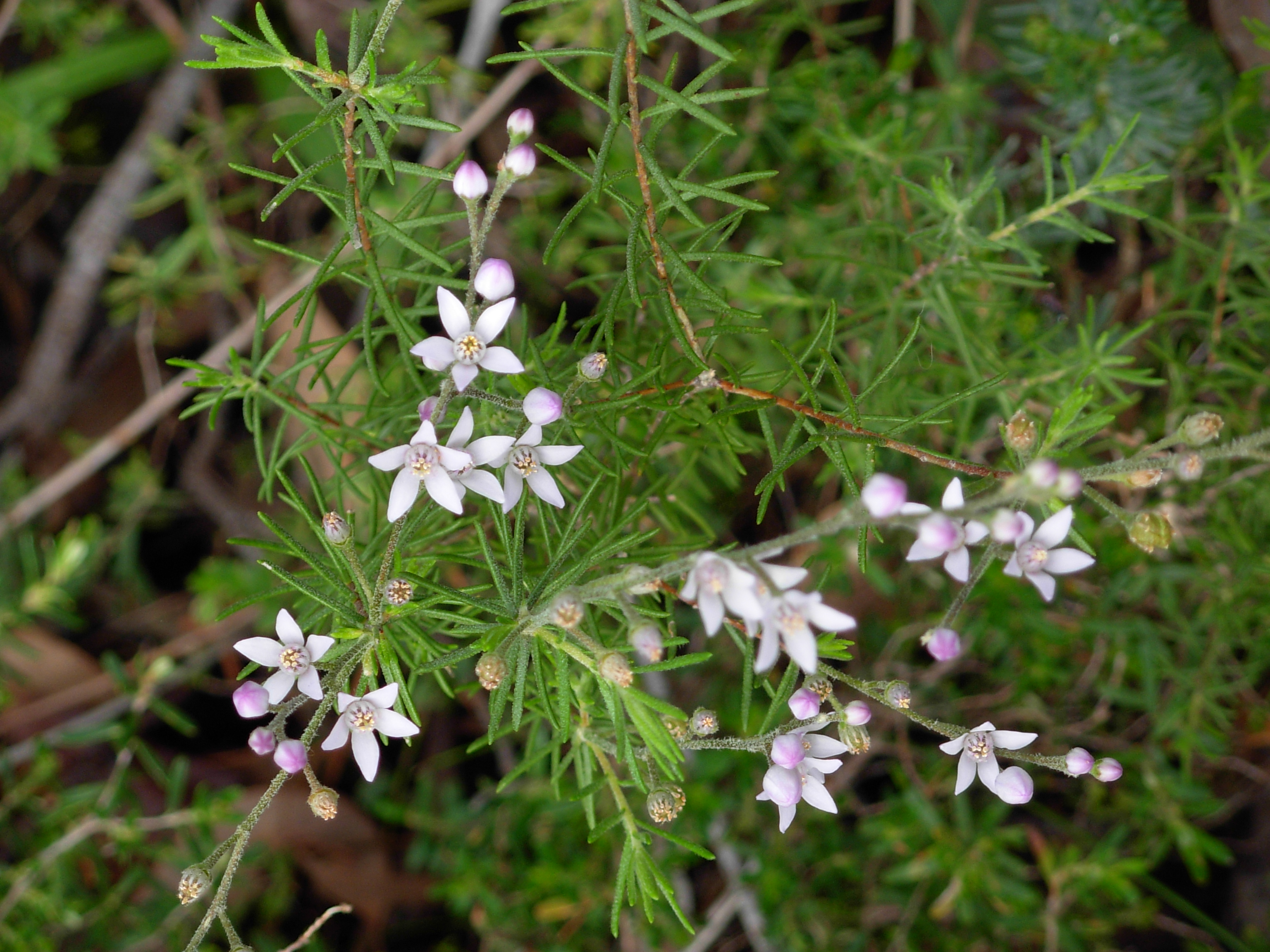
- In Kalamunda National Park

Scientific classification
- Kingdom: Plantae
- Clade: Tracheophytes
- Clade: Angiosperms
- Clade: Eudicots
- Clade: Rosids
- Order: Sapindales
- Family: Rutaceae
- Genus: Philotheca
- Species: P. spicata

Binomial name
- Philotheca spicata (A.Rich.) Paul G.Wilson

Synonyms
- Eriostemon ebracteatum Endl. orth. var.; Eriostemon ebracteatus Endl.; Eriostemon effusus Turcz.; Eriostemon racemosum Endl. orth. var.; Eriostemon racemosus Endl.; Eriostemon spicatus A.Rich.

= Philotheca spicata =

Pepper and salt

Species of flowering plant

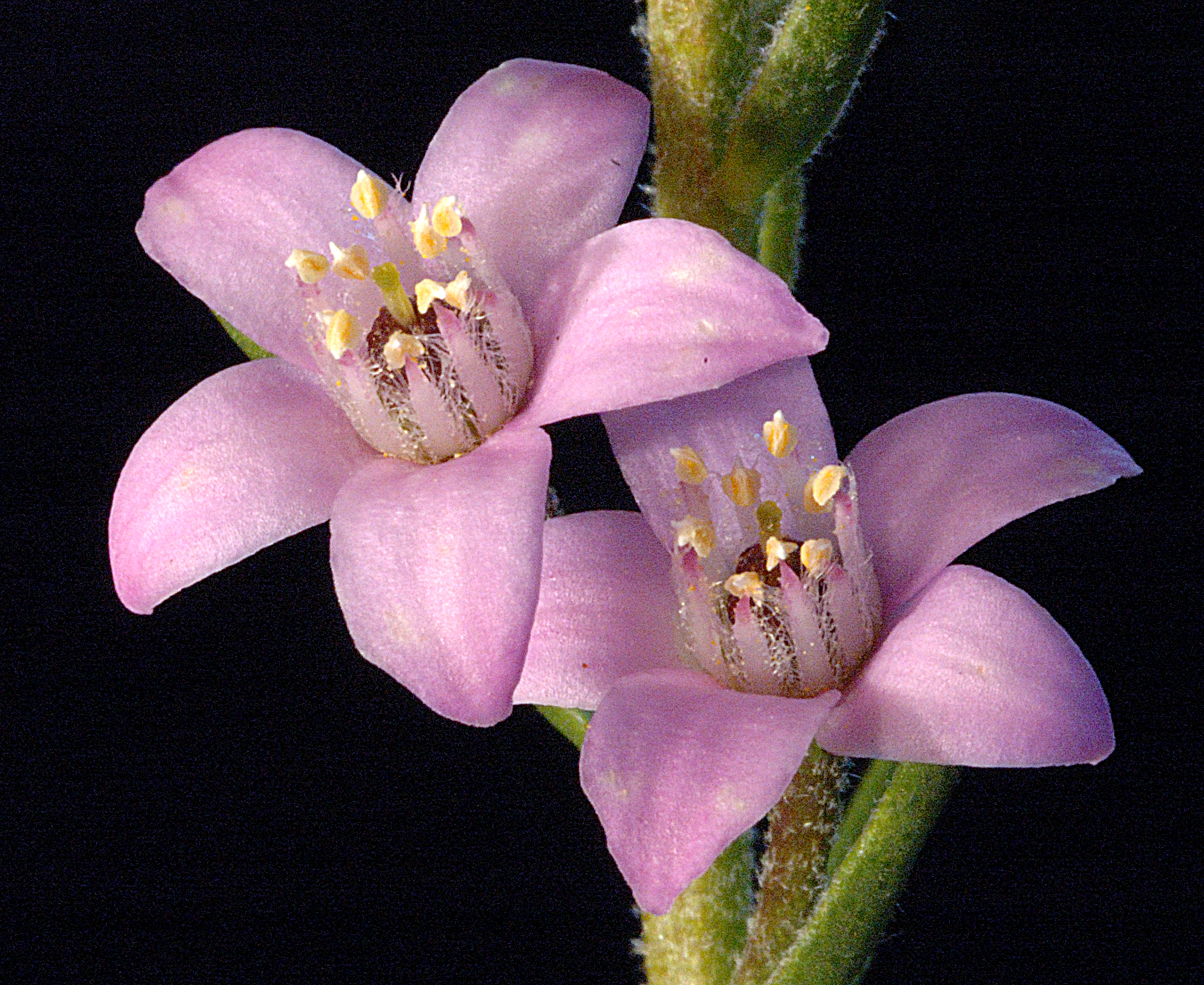
Flower detail

Philotheca spicata, commonly known as pepper and salt, is a species of flowering plant in the family Rutaceae and is endemic to the south-west of Western Australia. It is a small shrub with linear to narrow elliptical leaves and pink, mauve or blue flowers arranged in a raceme on the ends of branchlets.

== Description ==
Philotheca spicata is a shrub that typically grows to a height of 30–60 cm (12–24 in) and has smooth branchlets. The leaves are linear to narrow elliptical, 6–20 mm (0.24–0.79 in) long and concave on the upper surface. The flowers are arranged in leafless racemes of many flowers up to 15 cm (5.9 in) or more long with broadly elliptical bracts at the base of a thin pedicel 7 mm (0.28 in) long. The five sepals are triangular, about 1.5 mm (0.059 in) long, the petals are broadly elliptical, about 4.5 mm (0.18 in) long and the ten stamens are 2–2.5 mm (0.079–0.098 in) long. Flowering occurs from June to November, and the fruit is about 3 mm (0.12 in) long with two teeth on the end.

== Taxonomy ==
This species was first described in 1834 by French botanist Achille Richard who gave it the name Erisotemon spicatus in Voyage de découvertes de l'Astrolabe - Botanique. In 1998, Paul Wilson changed the name to Philotheca spicata in the journal Nuytsia.

== Distribution and habitat ==
Pepper and salt grows in sand or loam over laterite and occurs between Eneabba and Albany in the south-west of Western Australia.

== Conservation status ==
This philotheca is classified as "not threatened" by the Government of Western Australia Department of Parks and Wildlife.
