= Stirlingia anethifolia =

Scientific classification
- Kingdom: Plantae
- Clade: Tracheophytes
- Clade: Angiosperms
- Clade: Eudicots
- Order: Proteales
- Family: Proteaceae
- Genus: Stirlingia
- Species: S. anethifolia

Binomial name
- Stirlingia anethifolia (R.Br.) Endl.

Species of Australian shrub in the family Proteaceae

Stirlingia anethifolia is a shrub endemic to Western Australia.

The shrub typically grows to a height of 0.15 to 0.7 metres (0.5 to 2.3 ft). It blooms between September and November producing yellow flowers.

It is found on undulating sand plains along the south coast in the Great Southern and Goldfields-Esperance regions of Western Australia where it grows in sandy-clay soils.
