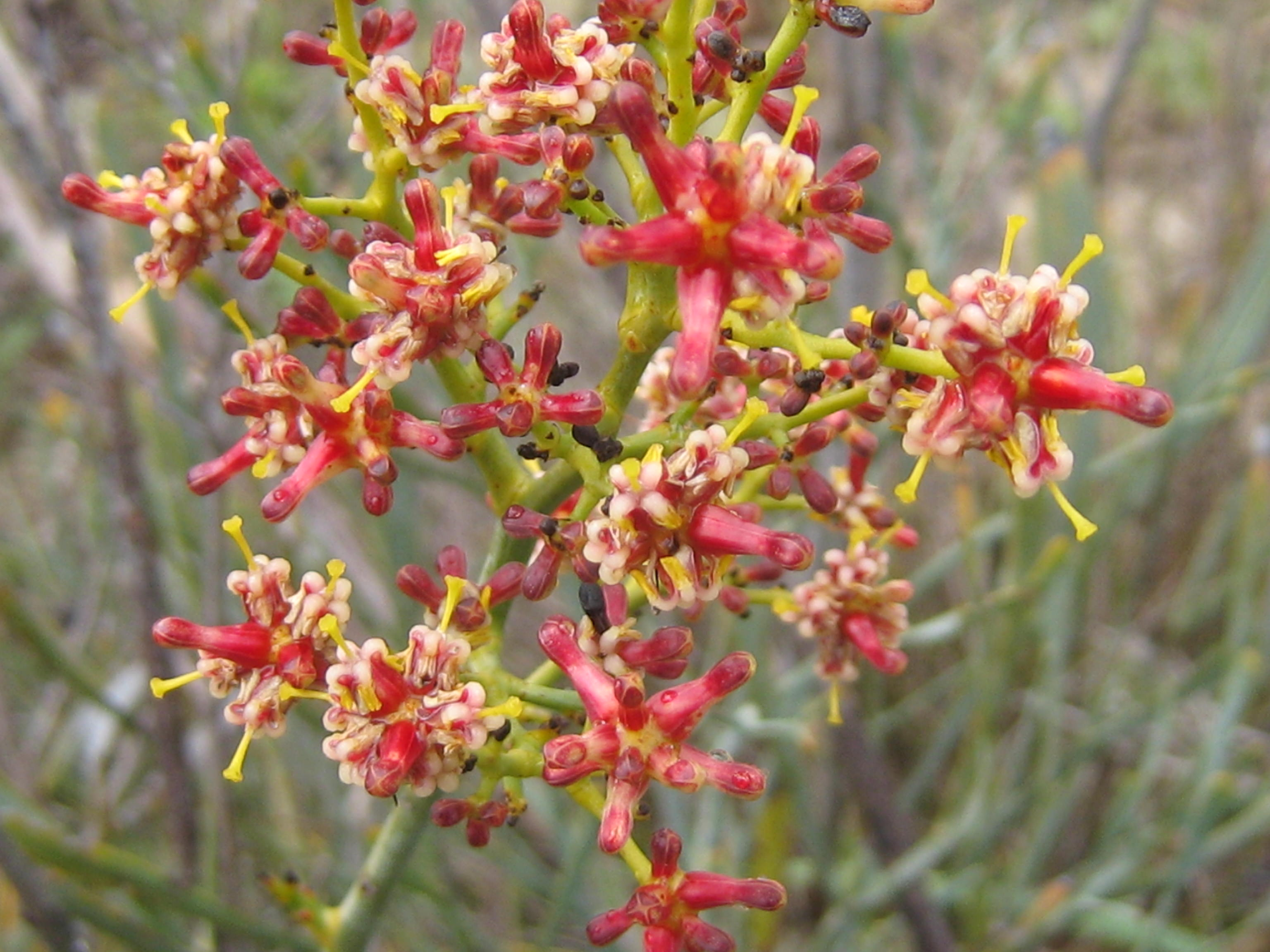

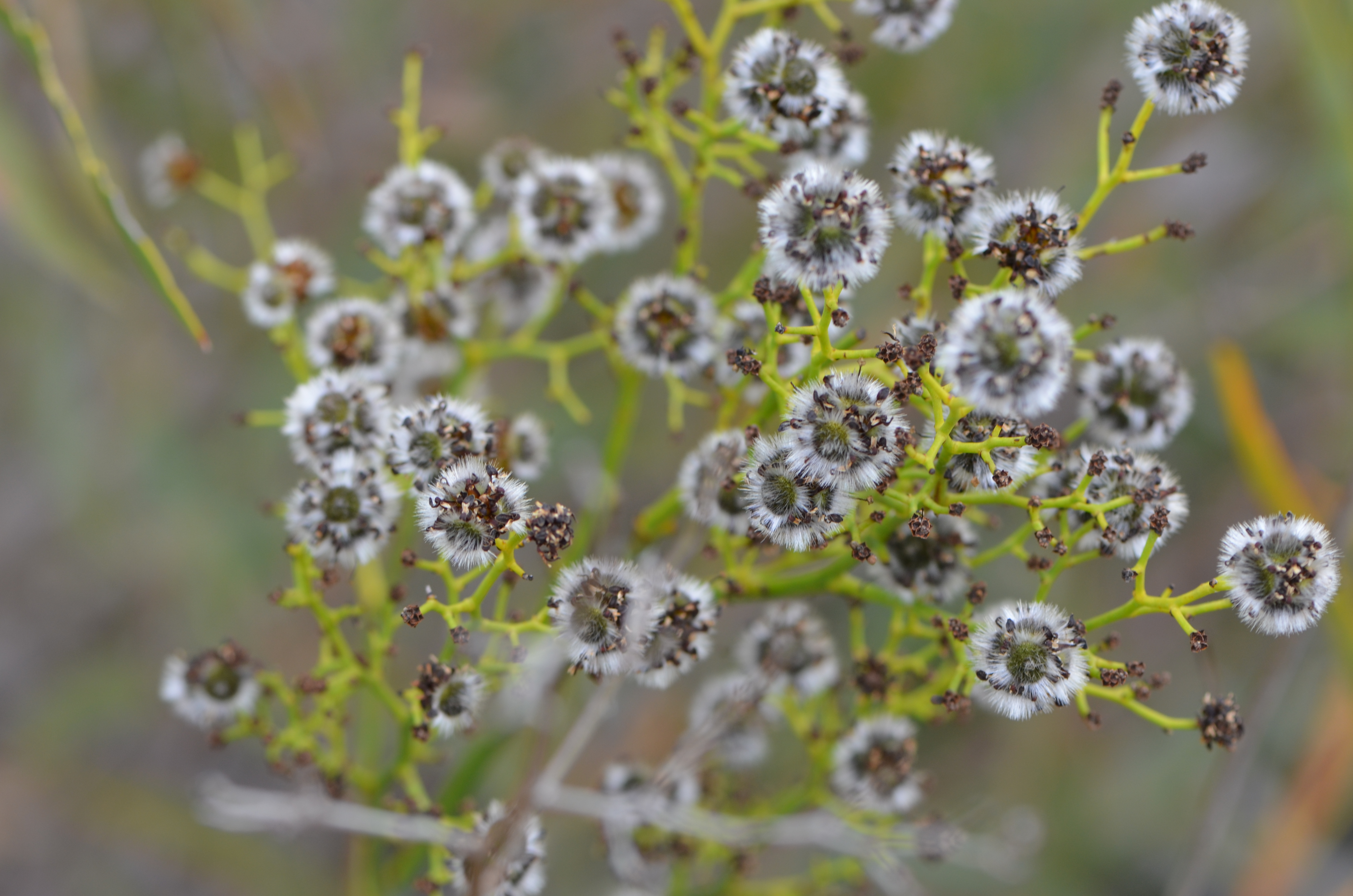

Scientific classification
- Kingdom: Plantae
- Clade: Tracheophytes
- Clade: Angiosperms
- Clade: Eudicots
- Order: Proteales
- Family: Proteaceae
- Genus: Stirlingia
- Species: S. latifolia

Binomial name
- Stirlingia latifolia (R.Br.) Steud.
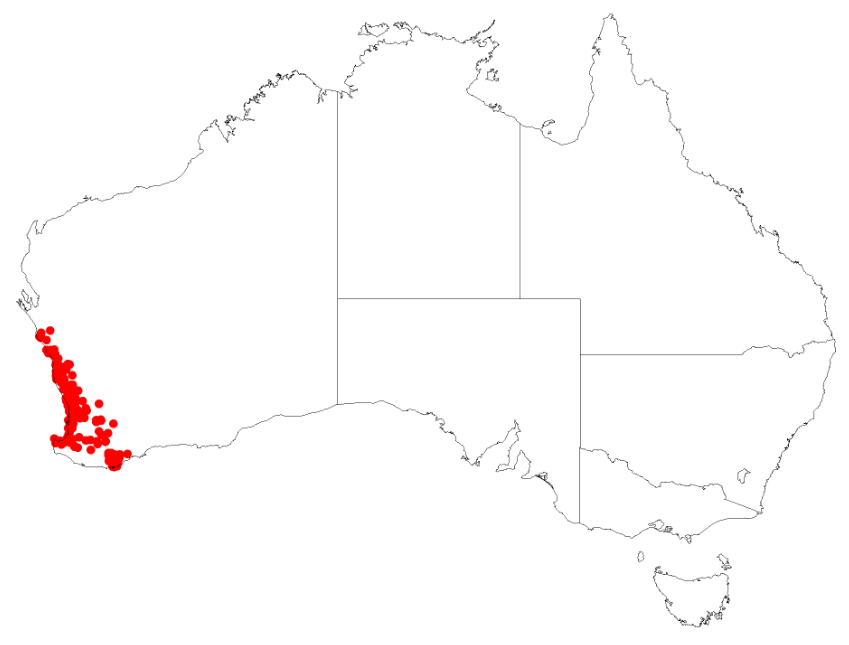
- Occurrence data from AVH

Synonyms
- Stirlingia paniculata Lindl.

= Stirlingia latifolia =

Blueboy

Species of plant endemic to Western Australia

Stirlingia latifolia, commonly known as blueboy, is a species of flowering plant endemic to Western Australia.

== Description ==
It grows as an erect shrub from 20 centimetres (8 in) to 1.5 metres (4 ft 11 in) high, consisting of numerous stems up to 70 centimetres (28 in) long, emerging from an underground lignotuber. Leaves are leathery, up to 10 centimetres (3.9 in) long, and bifurcate into lobes up to three times. They extend well up the stems. Flowers occur in a panicle atop a scape up to 1.5 metres (4 ft 11 in) high.

== Taxonomy ==
Stirlingia latifolia was first published by Robert Brown in 1830 under the name Simsia latifolia. It was later discovered that the generic name Simsia, published by Brown in 1810, was illegitimate, as it had already been published in 1807 for a genus of Asteraceae. A new generic name, Stirlingia, was published in 1838, but the transfer of the species published under Simsia was overlooked at first. Simsia latifolia would not be transferred into Stirlingia until 1841, when Ernst Steudel published Stirlingia latifolia (R.Br.) Steud. Meanwhile, John Lindley had published Stirlingia paniculata in his 1839 A Sketch of the Vegetation of the Swan River Colony; this would later be shown to be a synonym of S. latifolia. An attempt was later made to reinstate the name Simsia; resulting in its use by Carl Ostenfeld in 1921 when he published a purported variety, Simsia latifolia var. gracilis. This attempt was later rejected.

In 1995, Alex George published a thorough treatment of the Stirlingia for the Flora of Australia series of monographs. He reduced numerous names to synonymy, including declaring both S. paniculata and variety gracilis to be taxonomically indistinguishable from S. latifolia itself, and therefore synonymous. No infrageneric arrangement has been proffered for the genus, but George placed the species close to S. anethifolia. It has no recognised subspecies or varieties.

The common name blueboy refers to the fact that wall plaster made using sand taken from where S. latifolia occurs turns blue.

== Distribution and habitat ==
It occurs throughout western parts of Western Australia's Southwest Botanical Province, ranging from Kalbarri in the north, south to Albany. In many areas it is very common. It grows in deep sand, amongst heath, shrubland and woodland.

== Ecology ==
The species is not considered threatened.
