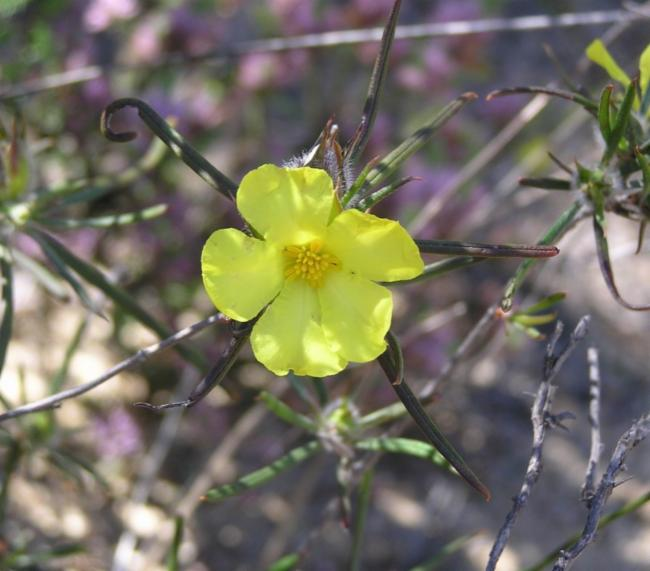
- Near Wongan Hills

Scientific classification
- Kingdom: Plantae
- Clade: Tracheophytes
- Clade: Angiosperms
- Clade: Eudicots
- Order: Dilleniales
- Family: Dilleniaceae
- Genus: Hibbertia
- Species: H. huegelii

Binomial name
- Hibbertia huegelii (Endl.) Benth.

= Hibbertia huegelii =

Species of flowering plant

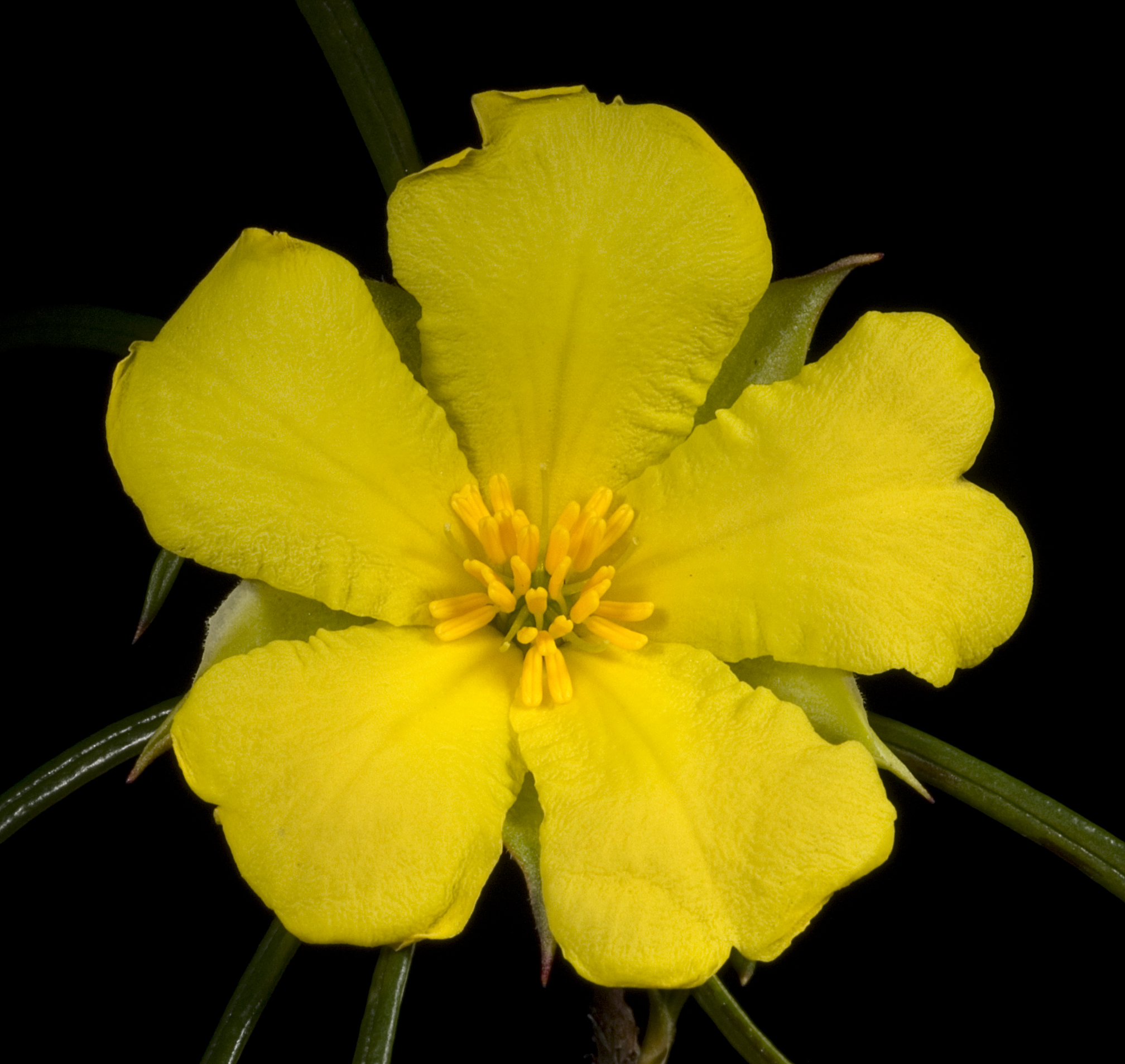
Flower detail

Hibbertia huegelii is a species of flowering plant in the family Dilleniaceae and is endemic to the south-west of Western Australia. It is an erect, spreading or prostrate shrub with hairy branchlets, linear leaves and yellow flowers arranged singly in leaf axils on the ends of shoots, with fifteen to twenty-five stamens in bundles around the four or five carpels.

== Description ==
Hibbertia huegelii is an erect, spreading or prostrate shrub that typically grows to a height of 20–30 cm (7.9–11.8 in) and has hairy branchlets covered with white to pale grey hairs. The leaves are linear, 30–40 mm (1.2–1.6 in) long and 1.0–1.5 mm (0.039–0.059 in) wide with the edges rolled under and obscuring the lower surface. The flowers are arranged singly in leaf axils on the ends of branchlets and are sessile with a narrow egg-shaped bract 7–10 mm (0.28–0.39 in) long at the base of the sepals. The five sepals are egg-shaped, joined at the base and 8–10 mm (0.31–0.39 in) long. The five petals are yellow, egg-shaped with the narrower end towards the base, 8–11 mm (0.31–0.43 in) long with a notch at the tip. There are fifteen to twenty-five stamens arranged in bundles of five, alternating with four or five glabrous carpels, each carpel with a single ovule.

== Taxonomy ==
This species was first formally described in 1837 by Stephan Endlicher in Enumeratio plantarum quas in Novae Hollandiae ora austro-occidentali ad fluvium Cygnorum et in sinu Regis Georgii collegit Carolus Liber Baro de Hügel and given the name Candollea huegelii. In 1880, Ferdinand von Mueller changed the name to Hibbertia huegelii in Fragmenta phytographiae Australiae. The specific epithet (huegelii) honours Charles von Hügel.

== Distribution and habitat ==
Hibbertia huegelii grows in woodland, mostly on the Darling Range in the Avon Wheatbelt, Geraldton Sandplains, Jarrah Forest and Swan Coastal Plain biogeographic regions south-western Western Australia.

== Conservation status ==
Hibbertia huegelii is classified as "not threatened" by the Western Australian Government Department of Parks and Wildlife.

== See also ==
- List of Hibbertia species
