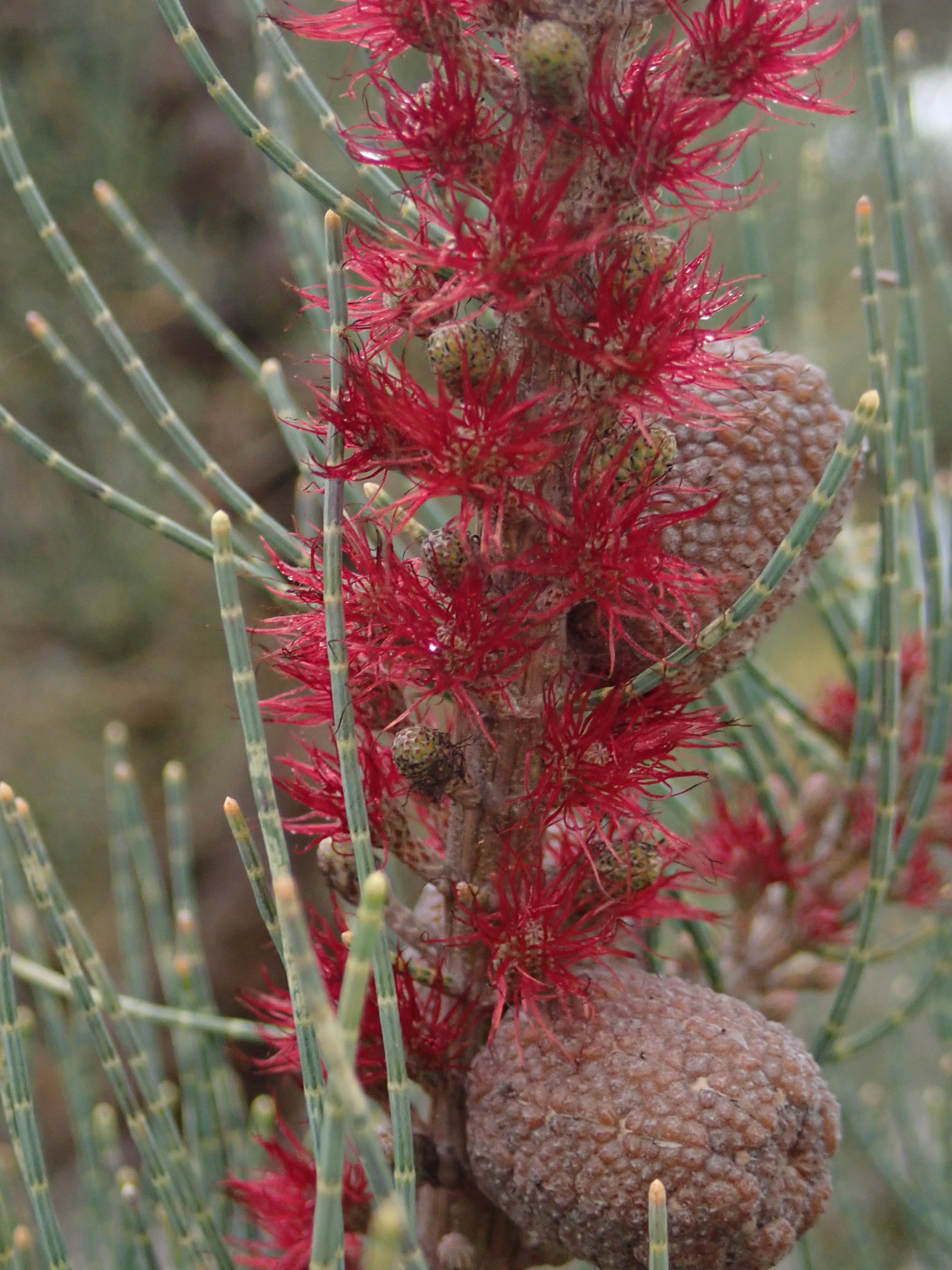
- Immature and mature female cones

Scientific classification
- Kingdom: Plantae
- Clade: Tracheophytes
- Clade: Angiosperms
- Clade: Eudicots
- Clade: Rosids
- Order: Fagales
- Family: Casuarinaceae
- Genus: Allocasuarina
- Species: A. humilis

Binomial name
- Allocasuarina humilis (Otto & A.Dietr.) L.A.S.Johnson
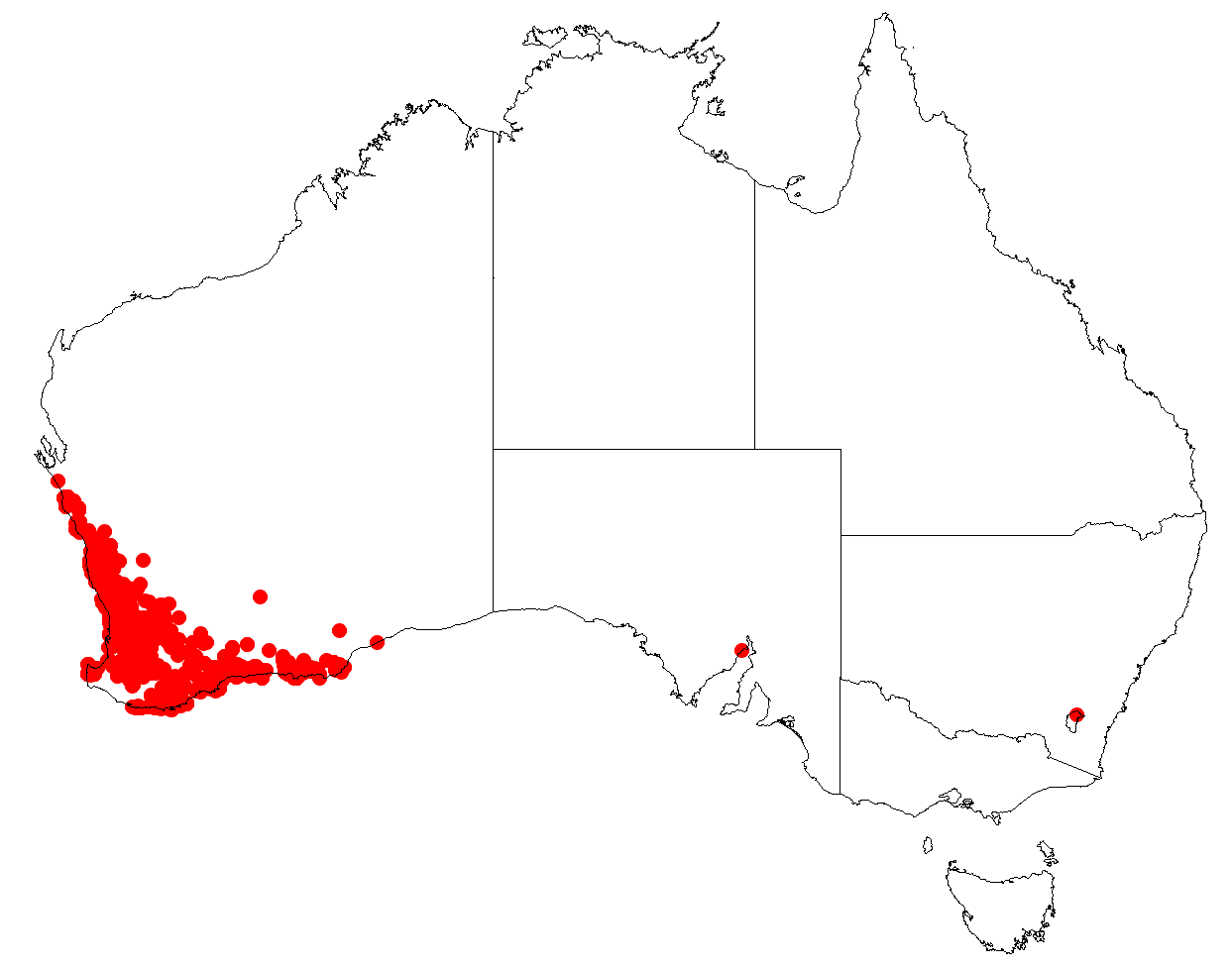
- Occurrence records downloaded from AVH, 22 June 2018

Synonyms
- List: Casuarina humilis Otto & A.Dietr.; Casuarina humilis Otto & A.Dietr. var. humilis; Casuarina humilis var. macrocarpa Miq.; Casuarina preissiana Miq.; Casuarina selaginoides Miq.; Casuarina tephrosperma Miq.

= Allocasuarina humilis =

Species of flowering plant

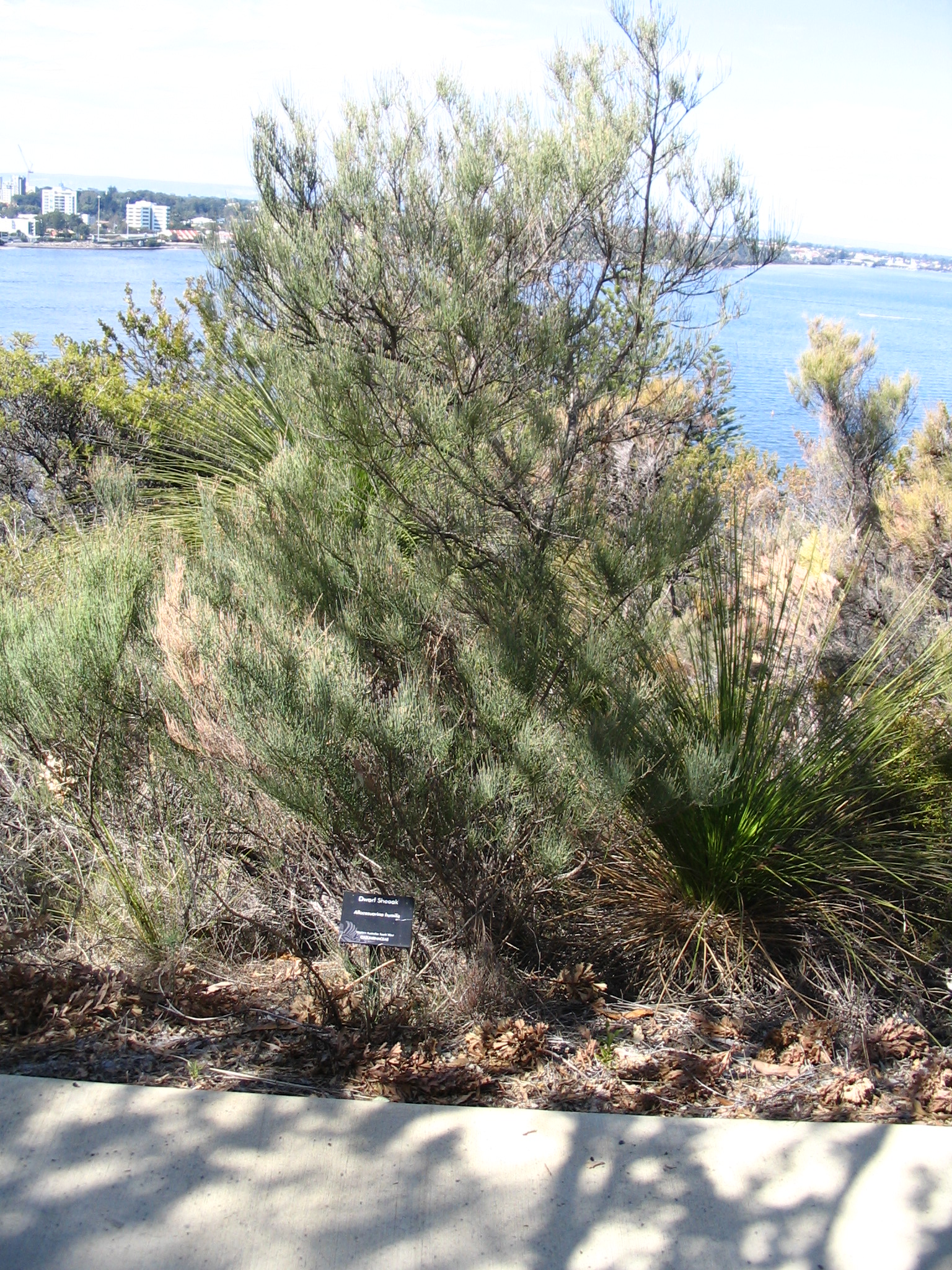
Habit in Kings Park, Perth

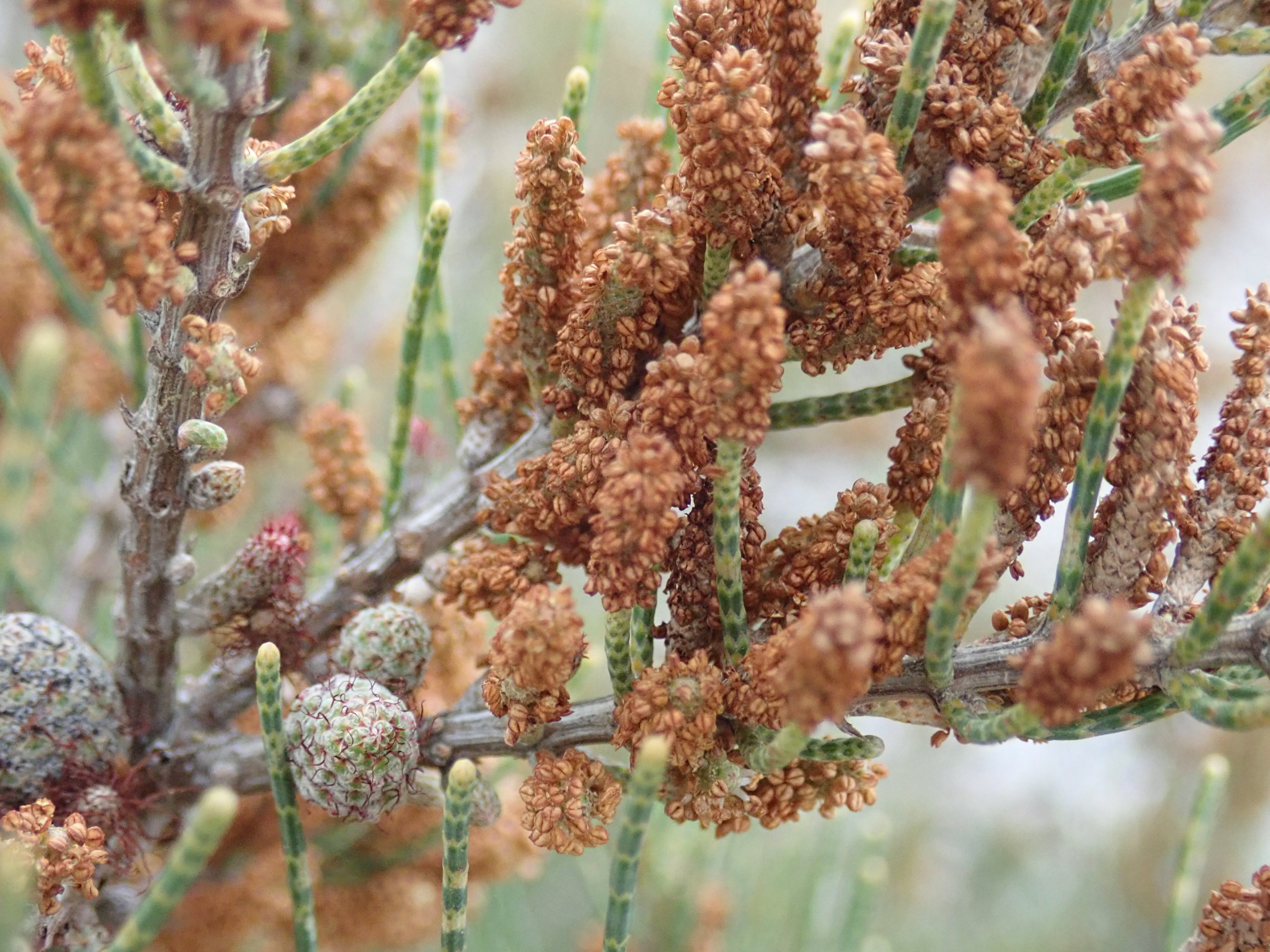
Male spikes and mature cones

Allocasuarina humilis, commonly known as dwarf sheoak, is a species of flowering plant in the family Casuarinaceae and is endemic to the south-west of Western Australia. It is an erect or spreading dioecious or monoecious shrub that has its leaves reduced to scales in whorls of five to seven, the mature fruiting cones 12–22 mm (0.47–0.87 in) long containing winged seeds (samaras) 5–6 mm (0.20–0.24 in) long.

== Description ==
Allocasuarina humilis is an erect or spreading, dioecious or monoecious shrub that typically grows to a height of 0.2–2 m (7.9 in – 6 ft 6.7 in). Its needle-like branchlets are more or less erect, up to 120 mm (4.7 in) long, the leaves reduced to scale-like teeth 0.4–0.5 mm (0.016–0.020 in) long, arranged in whorls of five to seven around the branchlets. The branchlets are smooth and sometimes waxy. The sections of branchlet between the leaf whorls (the "articles") are mostly 3–6 mm (0.12–0.24 in) long and 0.8–1.2 mm (0.031–0.047 in) wide. Male flowers are arranged in spikes 6–18 mm (0.24–0.71 in) long, in whorls of 12 to 16 per centimetre (per 0.39 in.), the anthers 0.7–0.8 mm (0.028–0.031 in) long. Flowering occurs from May to November, and the mature cones are sessile, 12–22 mm (0.47–0.87 in) long and 10–17 mm (0.39–0.67 in) in diameter containing samaras 5–6 mm (0.20–0.24 in) long with a short wing.

== Taxonomy ==
This sheoak was first formally described in 1841 by Christoph Friedrich Otto and Albert Gottfried Dietrich, who gave it the name Casuarina humilis in their book Allgemeine Gartenzeitung. In 1982, Lawrie Johnson transferred it to the new genus Allocasuarina as A. humilis in the Journal of the Adelaide Botanic Gardens. The specific epithet (humilis) means "low, or low-growing".

A 2003 molecular study of the family Casuarinaceae showed dwarf sheoak and horned sheoak (A. thuyoides) to be sister taxa, and form a clade with A. thuyoides, A. microstachya, karri oak (A. decussata) and western sheoak (A. fraseriana), all from Western Australia.

== Distribution and habitat ==
Allocasuarina humilis is found across southwest Western Australia, from the Murchison River in the north, to the south coast, where it extends eastwards to Israelite Bay. It grows on sand, sand over laterite, gravel, or clay.

== Use in horticulture ==
Allocasuarina humilis adapts readily to cultivation. Versatile, it tolerates a wide range of soils, including those with some alkalinity, and prefers a sunny aspect. Tolerant of some exposure to coastal conditions, it is also planted for erosion control and as a windbreak. Unlike many Australian native plants, it is relatively tolerant of phosphates to some degree in cultivation.
