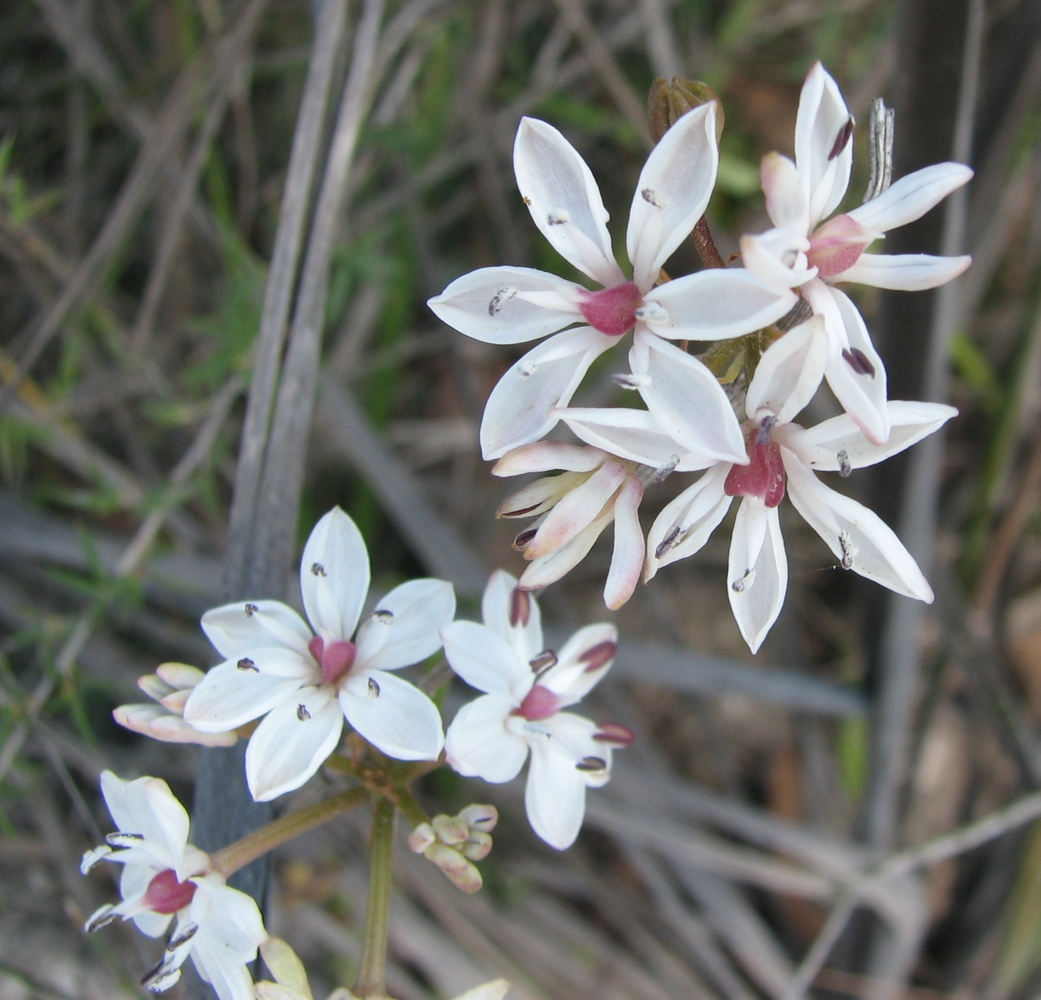
- At Anglesea Heath

Scientific classification
- Kingdom: Plantae
- Clade: Embryophytes
- Clade: Tracheophytes
- Clade: Spermatophytes
- Clade: Angiosperms
- Clade: Monocots
- Order: Liliales
- Family: Colchicaceae
- Genus: Burchardia
- Species: B. umbellata

Binomial name
- Burchardia umbellata R.Br.

= Burchardia umbellata =

Species of plant

Burchardia umbellata, known as milkmaids, is a perennial herbaceous plant native to woodlands and heath of eastern and southern Australia. It is known in all states. It typically flowers from September until November, in dry sclerophyll forests.

== Description ==
The narrow leaves of Burchardia umbellata are up to 60 cm long by 1.5 to 4 mm wide. Clusters of white or pale pink flowers with reddish centers sit atop a thin stalk that is 50 to 60 cm high. Each flower measures about 2.5 cm wide. There is a cluster of up to ten carrot-shaped tubers at the base, each about 5 mm thick.

== Taxonomy ==
Burchardia umbellata was first described by Robert Brown in 1810. The genus Burchardia is named for German botanist Johann Heinrich Burckhardt. The Latin species name umbellata means "umbrella" or "parasol", referring to the shape of the umbels of flowers.

== Use as food ==
Aboriginal Australians eat the potato-like tubers. The tubers can be eaten raw or cooked. They are white, fleshy, crisp, and starchy, with an undistinguished flavor.

== Cultivation ==
Burchardia umbellata is rarely available in nurseries, but it can be propagated by seed and kept in containers. It requires moist, well-drained soils and sun or light shade.
