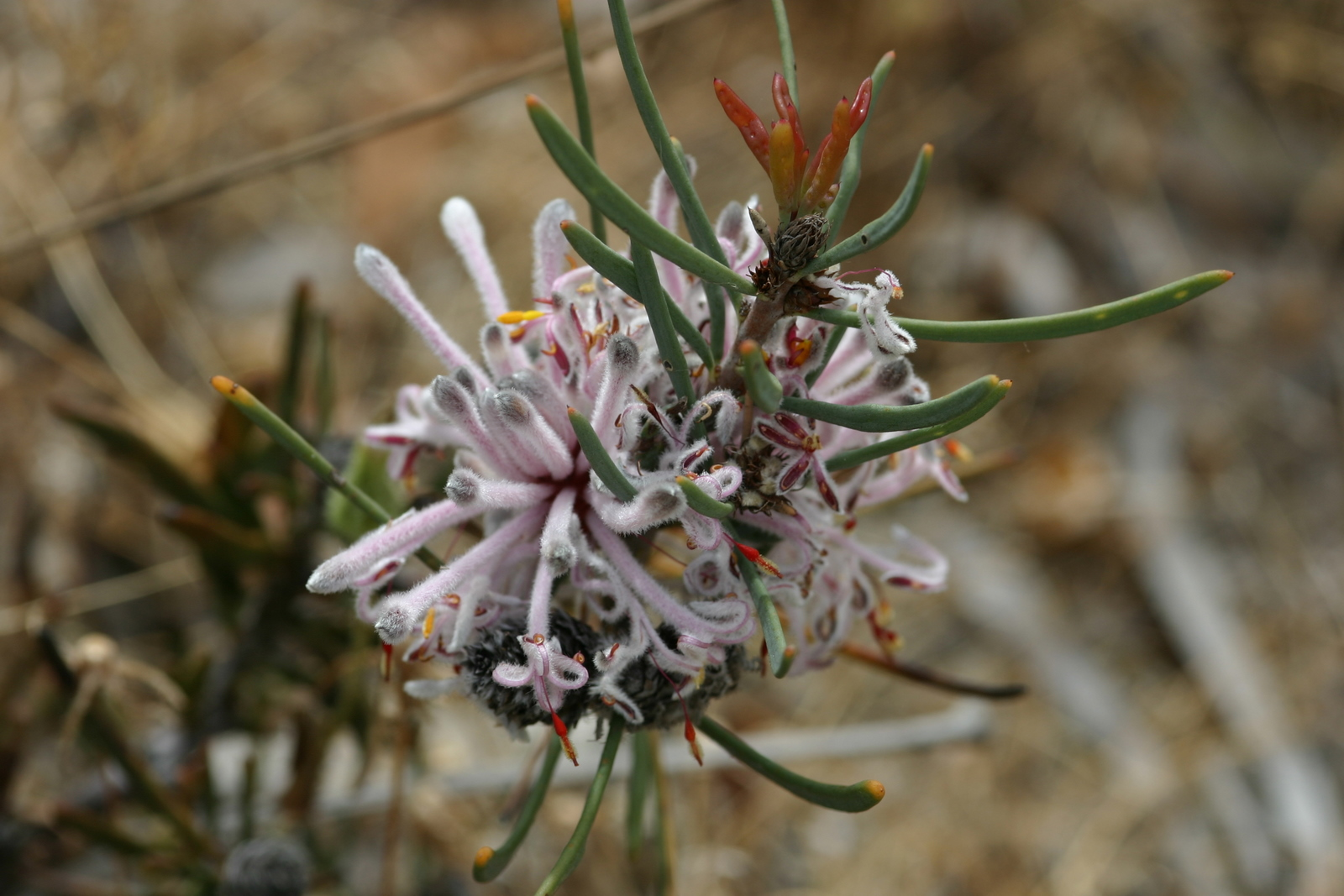

Scientific classification
- Kingdom: Plantae
- Clade: Tracheophytes
- Clade: Angiosperms
- Clade: Eudicots
- Order: Proteales
- Family: Proteaceae
- Genus: Petrophile
- Species: P. linearis

Binomial name
- Petrophile linearis R.Br.

Synonyms
- Petrophila linearis R.Br. orth. var.; Petrophila linearis var. microcephala Domin orth. var.; Petrophile falcata A.Cunn. ex Meisn. nom. inval., pro syn.; Petrophile linearis R.Br. var. linearis; Petrophile linearis var. microcephala Domin; Protea falcata Meisn. nom. inval., pro syn.

= Petrophile linearis =

Pixie mops

Species of shrub endemic to Western Australia

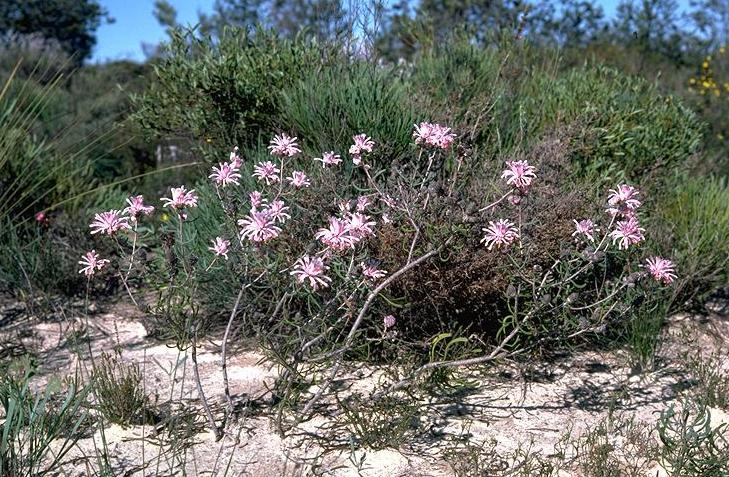
Habit near Mogumber

Petrophile linearis, commonly known as pixie mops, is a species of flowering plant in the family Proteaceae and is endemic to southwestern Western Australia. It is a shrub with narrow egg-shaped leaves, the narrower end towards the base, and oval to spherical heads of hairy, greyish-pink or mauve to almost white flowers.

== Description ==
Petrophile linearis is a shrub that typically grows to a height of 0.5–1 m (1 ft 8 in – 3 ft 3 in) and has glabrous branchlets and leaves. The leaves are narrow egg-shaped with the narrower end towards the base, 50–120 mm (2.0–4.7 in) long, 1.5–10 mm (0.059–0.394 in) wide and usually curved. The flowers are arranged on the ends of branchlets or in leaf axils in sessile, oval to spherical heads up to 25 mm (0.98 in) in diameter, with many linear, tapering involucral bracts at the base. The flowers are up to 35 mm (1.4 in) long, hairy, greyish-pink or mauve to almost white. Flowering occurs from August to November and the fruit is a nut, fused with others in an oval head about 25 mm (0.98 in) long.

== Taxonomy ==
Petrophile linearis was first formally described in 1830 by Robert Brown in the Supplementum to his Prodromus Florae Novae Hollandiae et Insulae Van Diemen from material collected by Charles Fraser near the Swan River in 1826. The specific epithet (linearis) refers to the linear leaves.

== Distribution and habitat ==
Pixie mops grows in woodland and heath on the coastal plain and Darling Range from Jurien Bay and Eneabba to Yallingup.

== Conservation status ==
This petrophile is classified as "not threatened" by the Western Australian Government Department of Parks and Wildlife.
