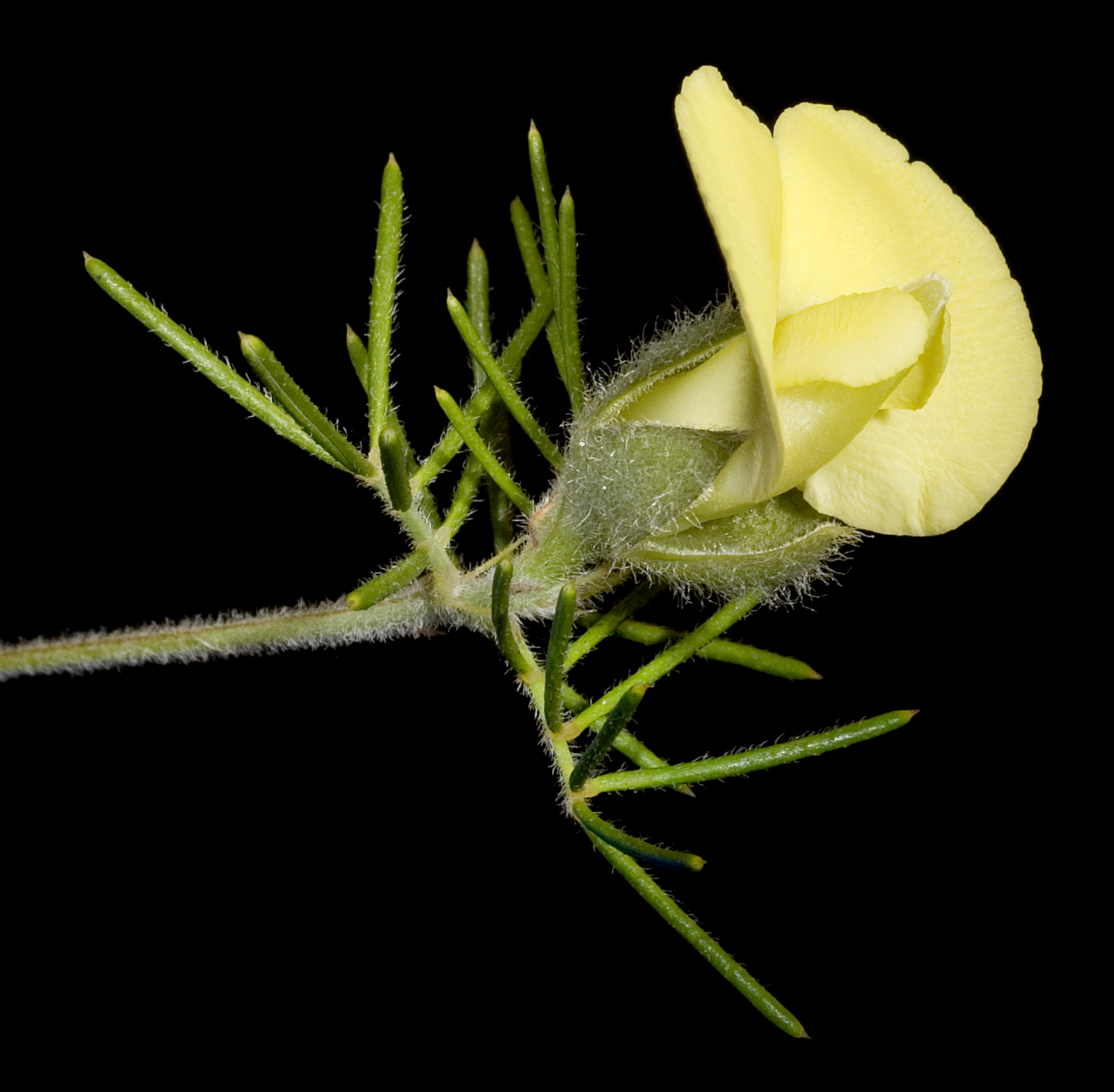
- Gompholobium tomentosum

Scientific classification
- Kingdom: Plantae
- Clade: Tracheophytes
- Clade: Angiosperms
- Clade: Eudicots
- Clade: Rosids
- Order: Fabales
- Family: Fabaceae
- Subfamily: Faboideae
- Genus: Gompholobium
- Species: G. tomentosum

Binomial name
- Gompholobium tomentosum Labill.

Synonyms
- Gompholobium aciculare Rchb. nom. inval., nom. nud.; Gompholobium aciculare Rchb.; Gompholobium lanatum A.Cunn. ex G.Don; Gompholobium tomentosum f. intricata Hochr.; Gompholobium tomentosum Labill. f. tomentosum

= Gompholobium tomentosum =

Hairy yellow pea

Species of legume

Gompholobium tomentosum, commonly known as hairy yellow pea, is a species of flowering plant in the pea family Fabaceae and is endemic to the south-west of Western Australia. It is an erect shrub with hairy foliage, pinnate leaves with five to seven leaflets, and uniformly yellow, pea-like flowers.

== Description ==
Gompholobium tomentosum is an erect shrub that typically grows to a height of 0.3–1 m (1 ft 0 in – 3 ft 3 in) and has hairy stems. The leaves are pinnate, arranged alternately along the branches, 10–20 mm (0.39–0.79 in) long with five to seven hairy leaflets appearing cylindrical, but with the edges curved downwards and one or two grooves along the lower surface. The flowers are uniformly yellow, each flower on a pedicel 3.5–4.0 mm (0.14–0.16 in) long with hairy bracteoles 4.6–5.5 mm (0.18–0.22 in) long on the pedicel. The sepals are hairy, 4.5–10.2 mm (0.18–0.40 in) long, the standard petal 11–14 mm (0.43–0.55 in) long, the wings 10.5–12.5 mm (0.41–0.49 in) long and the keel 10.0–11.2 mm (0.39–0.44 in) long. Flowering occurs from July to January and the fruit is a cylindrical pod.

== Taxonomy ==
Gompholobium tomentosum was first formally described in 1805 by Jacques Labillardière in Novae Hollandiae Plantarum Specimen. The specific epithet (tomentosum) means "tomentose".

== Distribution and habitat ==
This species of pea grows on coastal limestone, sand dunes and plains in the Avon Wheatbelt, Esperance Plains, Geraldton Sandplains, Jarrah Forest, Mallee, Swan Coastal Plain, Warren and Yalgoo biogeographic regions of south-western Western Australia.

== Conservation status ==
Gompholobium tomentosum is classified as "not threatened" by the Government of Western Australia Department of Biodiversity, Conservation and Attractions.
