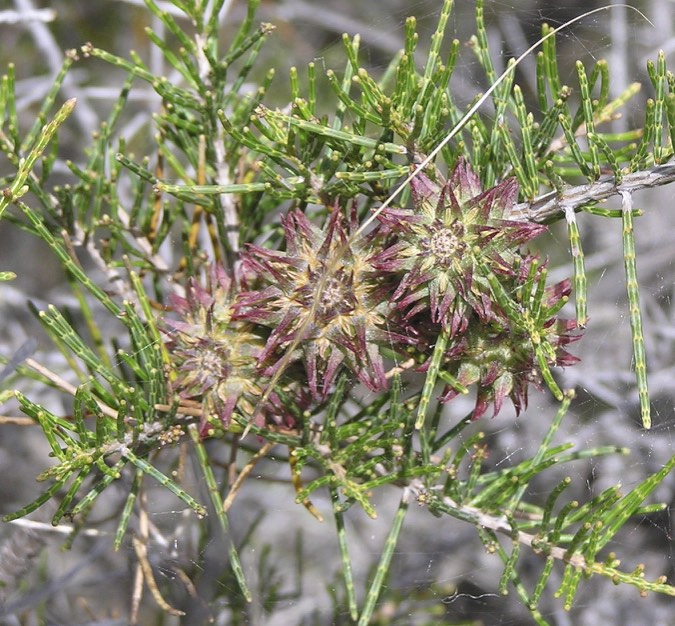
- In Cape Arid National Park

Scientific classification
- Kingdom: Plantae
- Clade: Tracheophytes
- Clade: Angiosperms
- Clade: Eudicots
- Clade: Rosids
- Order: Fagales
- Family: Casuarinaceae
- Genus: Allocasuarina
- Species: A. thuyoides

Binomial name
- Allocasuarina thuyoides (Miq.) L.A.S.Johnson
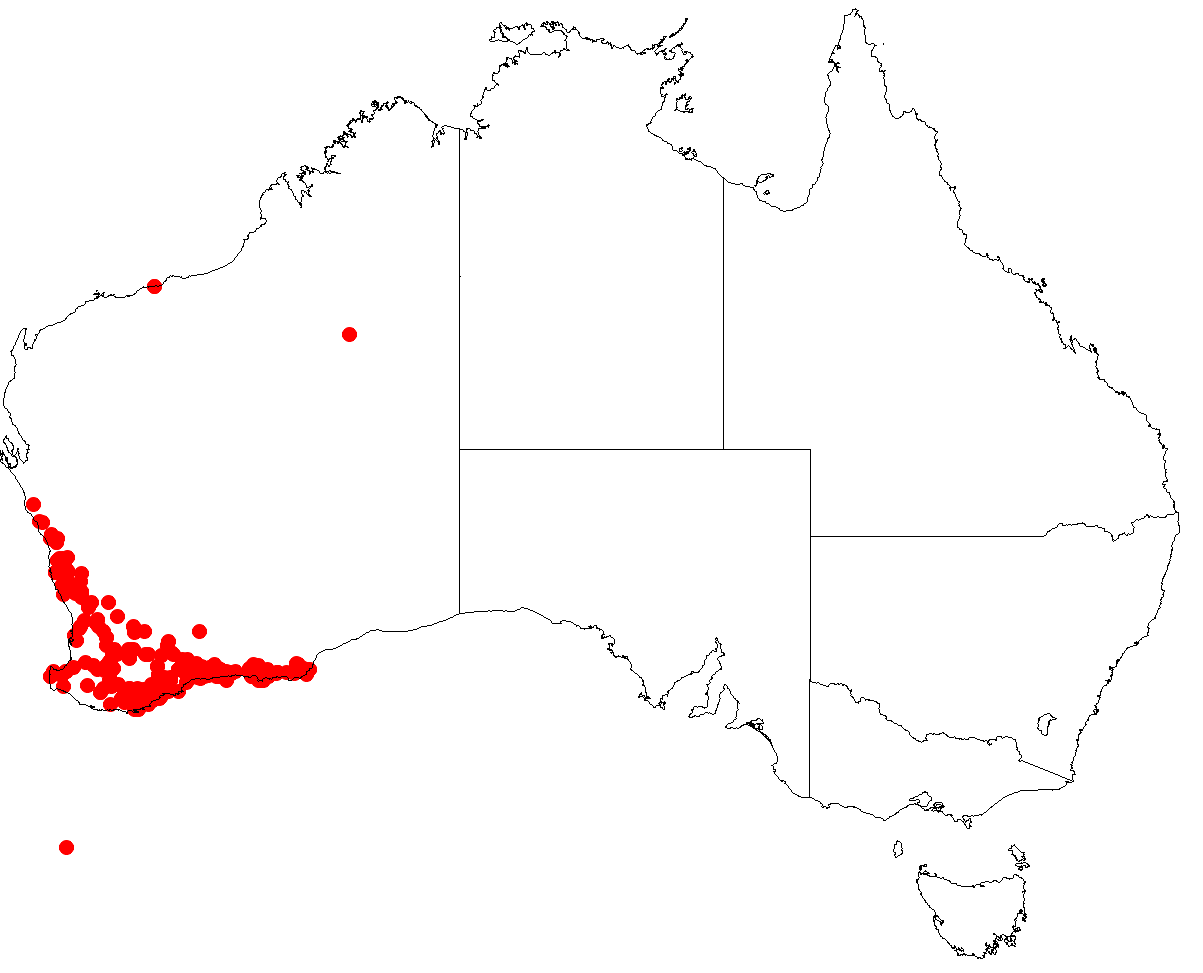
- Occurrence data from AVH

= Allocasuarina thuyoides =

Species of flowering plant

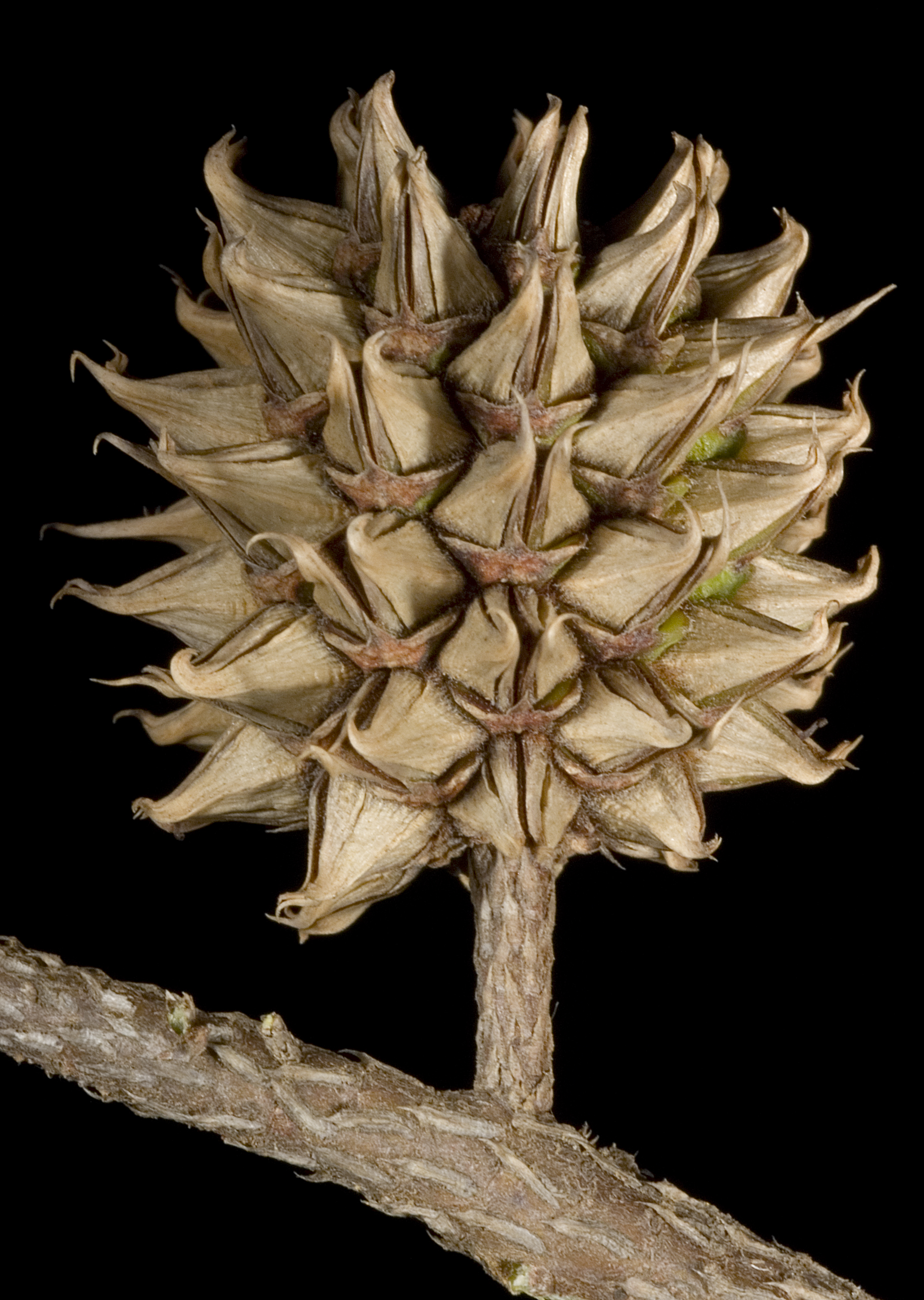
Mature fruiting cone

Allocasuarina thuyoides, commonly known as horned sheoak, is a species of flowering plant in the family Casuarinaceae and is endemic to the south-west of Western Australia. It is monoecious or dioecious shrub that has its leaves reduced to scales in whorls of five or six, the mature fruiting cones 8–20 mm (0.31–0.79 in) long containing winged seeds usually 5.0–6.0 mm (0.20–0.24 in) long.

== Description ==
Allocasuarina thuyoides is a monoecious or dioecious, intricately branched shrub that typically grows to a height of 0.3–2 m (1 ft 0 in – 6 ft 7 in). Its branchlets are up to 30 mm (1.2 in) long, the leaves reduced to erect, scale-like teeth 0.4–0.5 mm (0.016–0.020 in) long, arranged in whorls of five or six around the needle-like branchlets. The sections of branchlet between the leaf whorls are mostly 1–3 mm (0.039–0.118 in) long, 0.3–0.5 mm (0.012–0.020 in) wide. Male flowers are arranged in whorls of up to four 1–5 mm (0.039–0.197 in) long on the ends of branchlets, the anthers 0.4–0.6 mm (0.016–0.024 in) long. Female cones are on slender peduncles 2–7 mm (0.079–0.276 in) long, the mature cones shortly cylindrical to spherical, 8–20 mm (0.31–0.79 in) long and 8–15 mm (0.31–0.59 in) in diameter containing winged seeds 5.0–6.0 mm (0.20–0.24 in) long.

== Taxonomy ==
This sheoak was first formally described in 1845 by Friedrich Anton Wilhelm Miquel who gave it the name Casuarina thuyoides in Lehmann's Plantae Preissianae. It was reclassified in 1982 as Allocasuarina thuyoides by Lawrie Johnson in the Journal of the Adelaide Botanic Gardens. The specific epithet (thuyoides) means "Thuja-like".

== Distribution and habitat ==
Allocasuarina thuyoides is widely distributed in the south-west of Western Australia, occurring from the Murchison River south to Albany and east to Esperance, where it grows in heath on laterite and sandplains.
