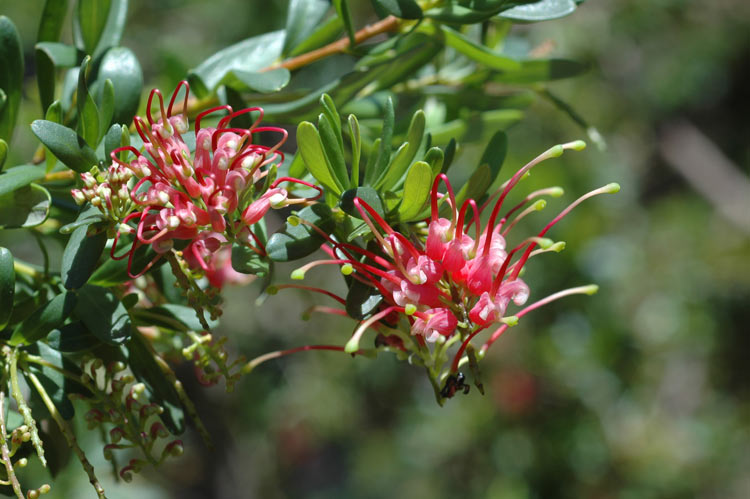
- In Mount Coot-tha Botanic Gardens

Conservation status
- Endangered (IUCN 3.1)

- Priority One — Poorly Known Taxa (DEC)

Scientific classification
- Kingdom: Plantae
- Clade: Embryophytes
- Clade: Tracheophytes
- Clade: Spermatophytes
- Clade: Angiosperms
- Clade: Eudicots
- Order: Proteales
- Family: Proteaceae
- Genus: Grevillea
- Species: G. evanescens

Binomial name
- Grevillea evanescens Olde & Marriott

= Grevillea evanescens =

Species of shrub endemic to Western Australia

Grevillea evanescens is an endangered species of flowering plant in the family Proteaceae and is endemic to the south-west of Western Australia. It is an erect to spreading shrub with oblong to elliptic leaves and clusters of pale to bright red and cream-coloured flowers.

== Description ==
Grevillea evanescens is an erect to spreading shrub that typically grows to a height of 2–3.5 m (6 ft 7 in – 11 ft 6 in). The leaves are oblong to egg-shaped with the narrower end towards the base, or elliptic, 20–45 mm (0.79–1.77 in) long and 2.5–9 mm (0.098–0.354 in) wide. The upper surface of the leaves is more or less glabrous and the lower surface of young leaves is silky-hairy. The flowers are arranged in downcurved clusters of eight to twelve flowers on a rachis 7–15 mm (0.28–0.59 in) long. The flowers are pale to bright red and cream-coloured with a red, green tipped style, the pistil 26–27 mm (1.0–1.1 in) long. Flowering occurs in winter and spring and the fruit is an oblong follicle 10–11 mm (0.39–0.43 in) long.

== Taxonomy ==
Grevillea evanescens was first formally described in 1994 by Peter M. Olde and Neil R. Marriott in The Grevillea Book from specimens collected by Olde near Gingin in 1991. The specific epithet (evanescens) means "disappearing", referring to the hairs on the lower leaf surface.

== Distribution and habitat ==
This grevillea grows in sandy soil in Banksia woodland near Gingin, in the Swan Coastal Plain biogeographic region of south-western Western Australia.

== Conservation status ==
Grevillea evanescens is listed as endangered on the IUCN Red List of Threatened Species and as priority one by the Government of Western Australia Department of Biodiversity, Conservation and Attractions, meaning that it is known from only one or a few locations which are potentially at risk.

The species has a severely fragmented range due to habitat clearance for agriculture, housing and road development. It an estimated extent of occurrence of 654 km^{2} (253 sq mi). Both its population and the quality of its habitat are in decline. As it is mainly found along road verges, it is threatened by weed invasion and verge clearance. It is unknown if this species is susceptible to die-back disease caused by the plant pathogen Phytophtora.
