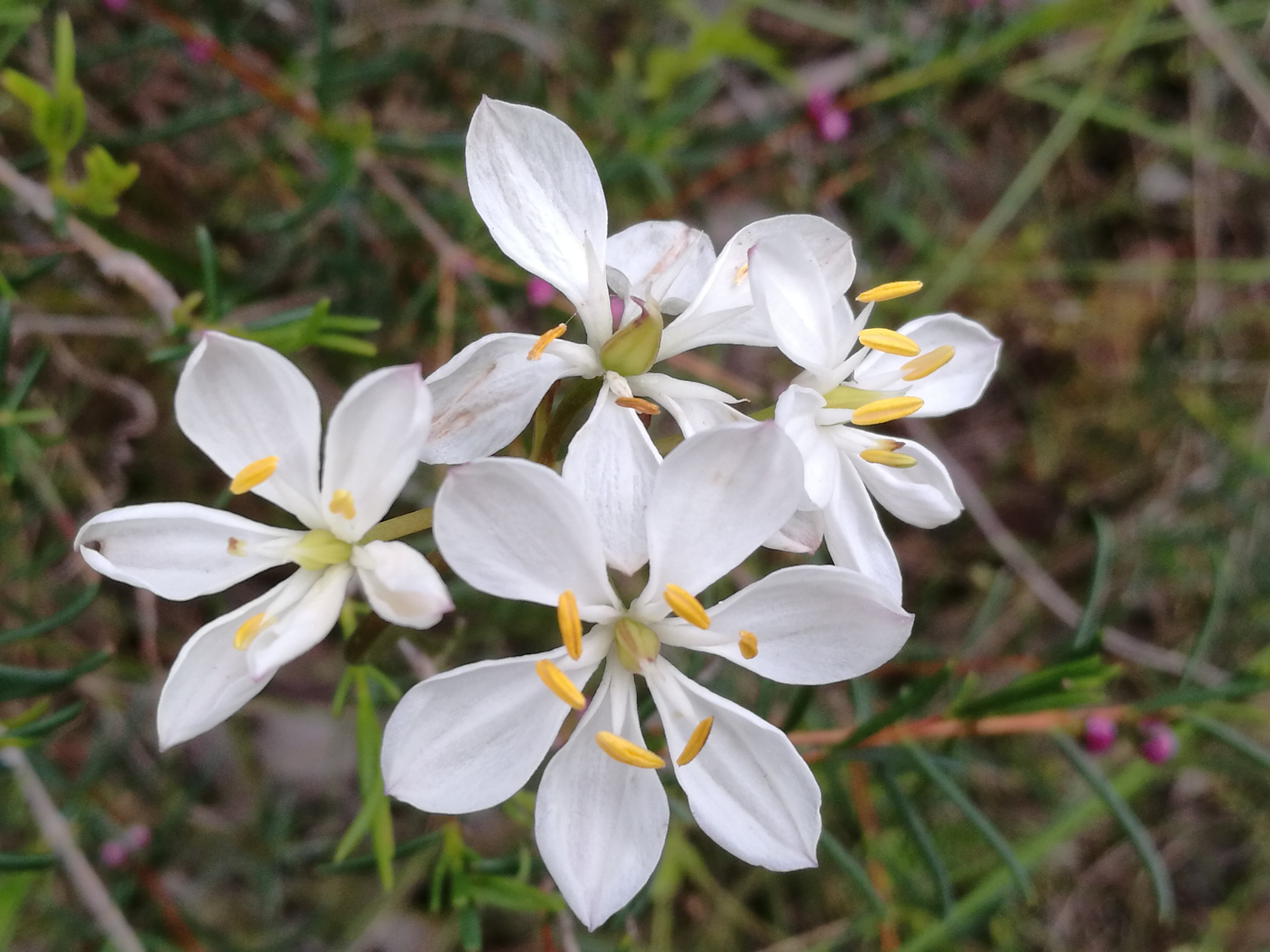

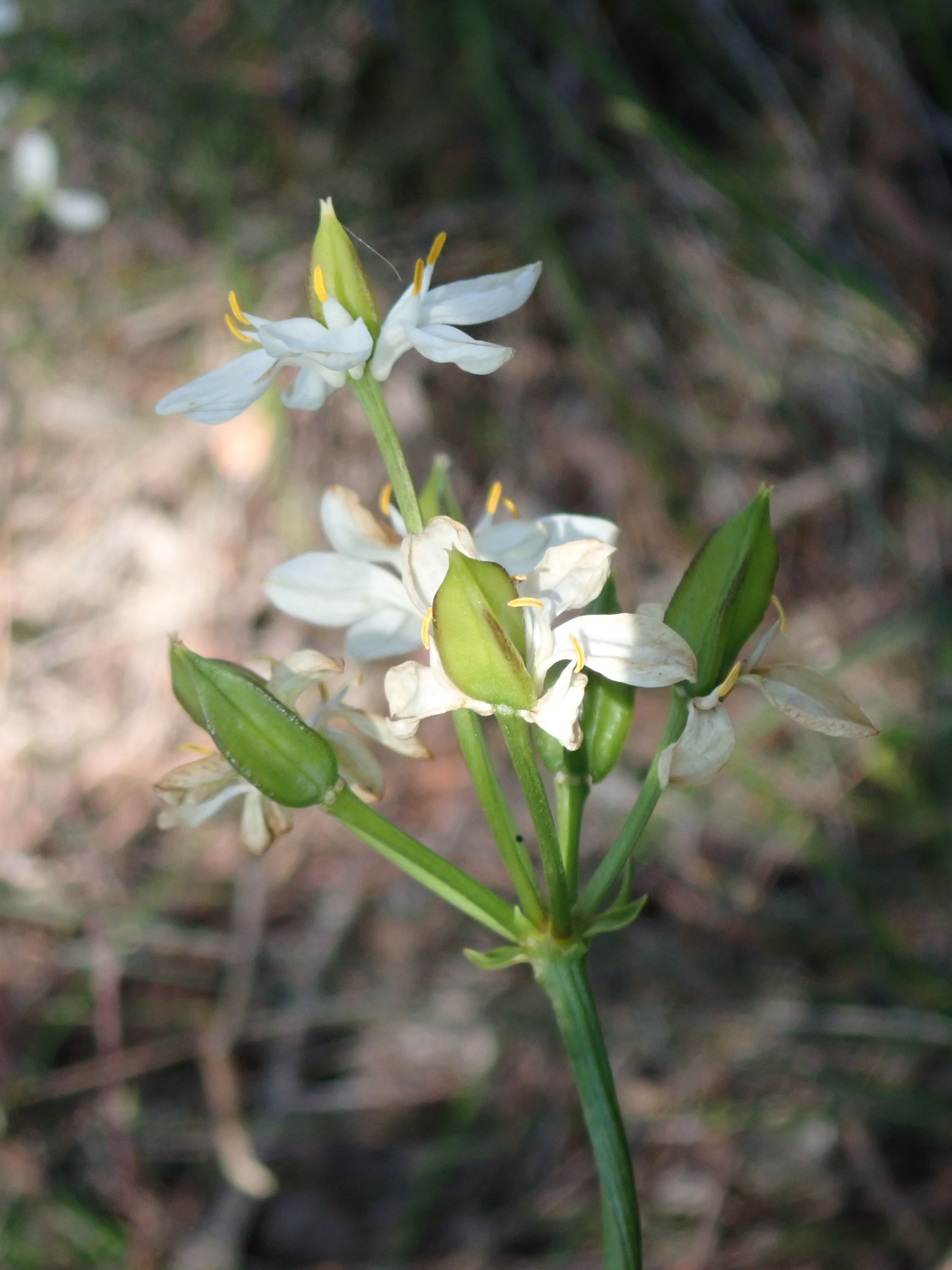

Scientific classification
- Kingdom: Plantae
- Clade: Embryophytes
- Clade: Tracheophytes
- Clade: Spermatophytes
- Clade: Angiosperms
- Clade: Monocots
- Order: Liliales
- Family: Colchicaceae
- Genus: Burchardia
- Species: B. congesta

Binomial name
- Burchardia congesta Lindl.

= Burchardia congesta =

Species of flowering plant

Burchardia congesta is a perennial herb in the family Colchicaceae, and is native to Western Australia.

== Taxonomy ==
Burchardia congesta was first described by John Lindley in 1840. The name has not been revised, and there are no synonyms.

== Origin of name ==
The genus Burchardia is named for German botanist Johann Heinrich Burckhardt. The species name congesta is Latin for "piled up, crowded".
