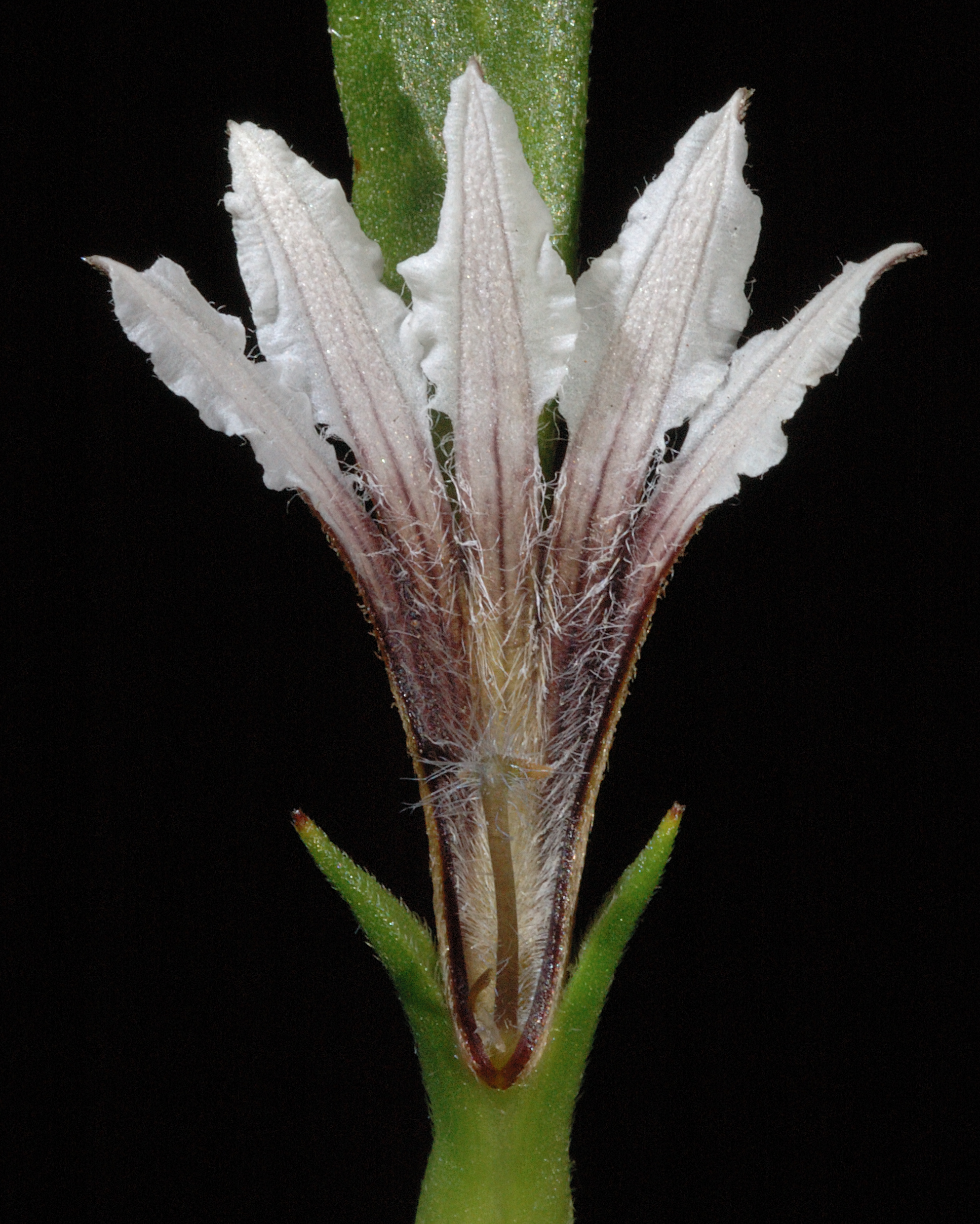

Scientific classification
- Kingdom: Plantae
- Clade: Tracheophytes
- Clade: Angiosperms
- Clade: Eudicots
- Clade: Asterids
- Order: Asterales
- Family: Goodeniaceae
- Genus: Scaevola
- Species: S. repens

Binomial name
- Scaevola repens de Vriese
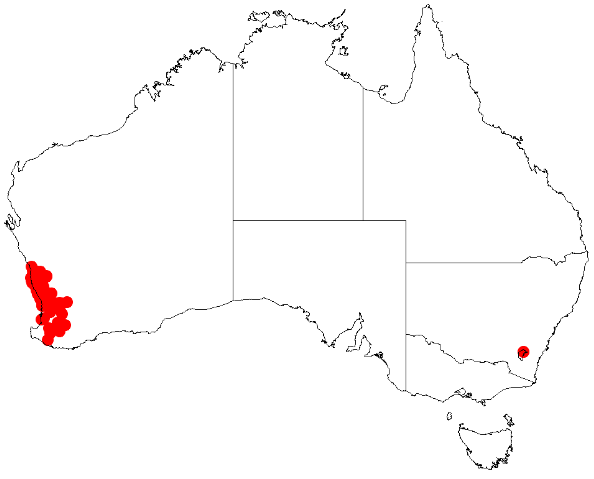
- Occurrence data from AVH

Synonyms
- Dampiera repens var. angustifolia de Vriese

= Scaevola repens =

Species of shrub

Scaevola repens is a shrub in the family Goodeniaceae, endemic to the south west of Western Australia.

== Description ==
Scaevola repens is a prostrate shrub with branches up to 50 cm long. The leaves are stalkless, and have smooth edges, and may be with or without prominent axillary hairs. The leaf blade is up to 90 mm long by 15 mm wide. The flowers occur in axillary spikes which are up to 30 mm long. The bracts are like leaves but smaller. The sepals are rim-like and up to 1 mm long. The corolla is 8-15 mm long, and has dense, appressed, golden or yellowish hairs on the outside, and is hairy on the inside on both the lobes and the throat and is white to cream and sometimes (rarely) mauve. The fruit is ovoid, and about 4 mm long and warty.

It differs from other Scaevola species that have flowers in axillary spikes, by having hairs on the outside of the corolla, which are yellow to almost golden.

== Taxonomy and naming ==
It was first described and named by the Dutch botanist, Willem Hendrik de Vriese in 1845, describing it from a specimen collected in 1839 from "sandy woods near the city of Perth" (specimen 1519 in the Ludwig Preiss herbarium). The specific epithet, repens, derives from the Latin verb, repere, (to creep) to give a Botanical Latin adjective which describes the plant as "creeping" or having "creeping stems".

== Distribution ==
It is found in the IBRA Regions of the Avon Wheatbelt, the Geraldton Sandplains, the Jarrah Forest, and the Swan Coastal Plain., or (using Beard's provinces) in the South-West Province
