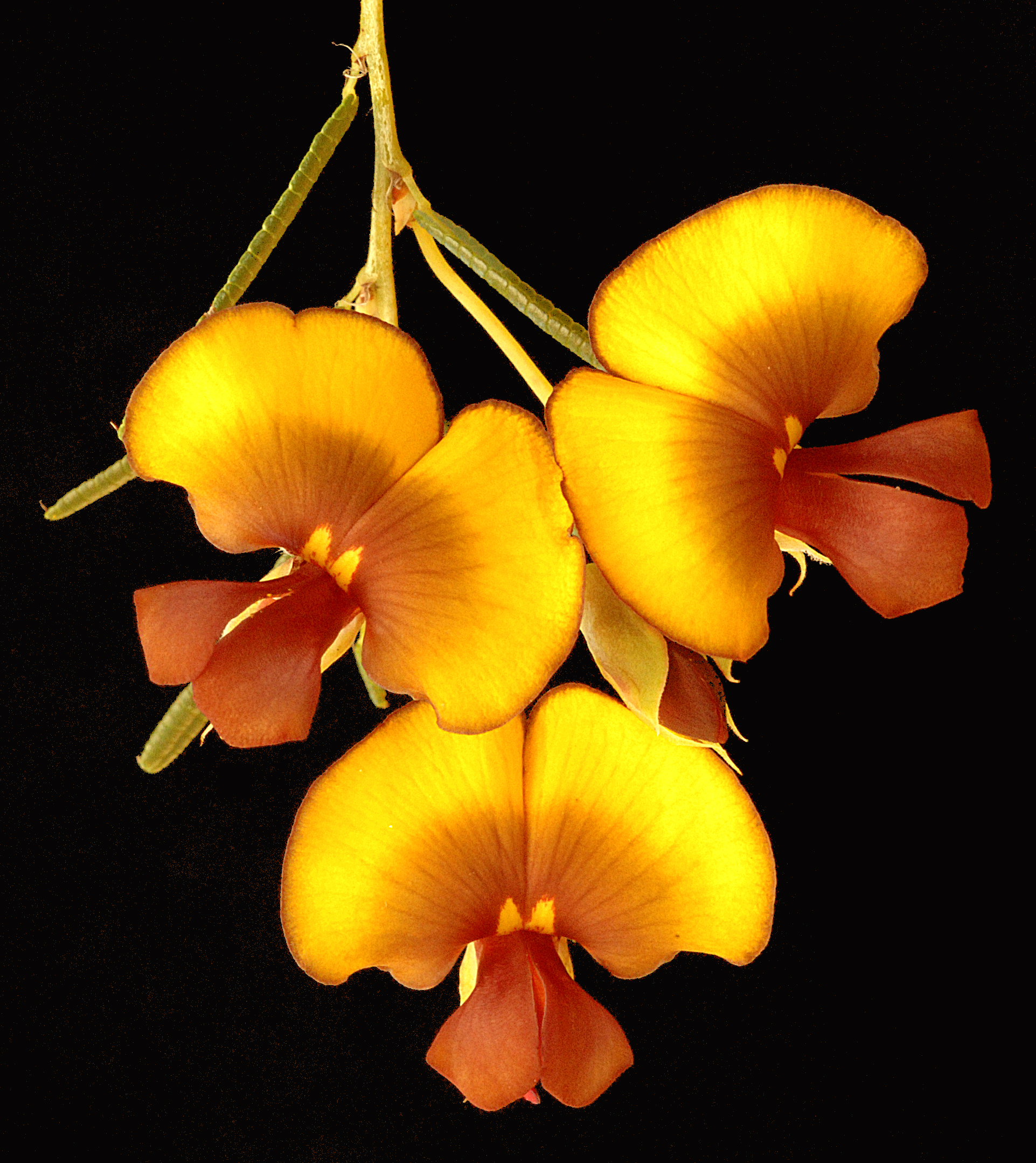

Scientific classification
- Kingdom: Plantae
- Clade: Embryophytes
- Clade: Tracheophytes
- Clade: Spermatophytes
- Clade: Angiosperms
- Clade: Eudicots
- Clade: Rosids
- Order: Fabales
- Family: Fabaceae
- Subfamily: Faboideae
- Genus: Bossiaea
- Species: B. eriocarpa

Binomial name
- Bossiaea eriocarpa Benth.

Synonyms
- List: Bossiaea endlicheri Meisn. nom. illeg.; Bossiaea endlicheri var. angustifolia Meisn.; Bossiaea endlicheri var. ovalifolia (Endl.) Meisn. nom. illeg.; Bossiaea eriocarpa var. eriocalyx Benth.; Bossiaea eriocarpa Benth. var. eriocarpa; Bossiaea eriocarpa var. normalis Benth.; Bossiaea eriocarpa var. planifolia Domin; Bossiaea gilbertii Turcz.; Bossiaea nervosa Meisn.; Bossiaea ovalifolia Endl.

= Bossiaea eriocarpa =

Common brown pea

Species of legume

Bossiaea eriocarpa, commonly known as common brown pea, is a species of flowering plant in the family Fabaceae and is endemic to the south-west of Western Australia. It is a shrub with narrow oblong or linear leaves and yellow and red flowers.

== Description ==
Bossiaea eriocarpa is a shrub that typically grows to a height of 0.6–1.0 m (2 ft 0 in – 3 ft 3 in) and usually has densely hairy branches. The leaves are narrow oblong or linear, 5–25 mm (0.20–0.98 in) long and 1.5–6 mm (0.059–0.236 in) wide on a petiole 0.8–2 mm (0.031–0.079 in) long with a stipule 0.6–4 mm (0.024–0.157 in) long at the base. The leaves are glabrous, the lower surface paler than the upper surface. The flowers are arranged singly or in small groups, each flower on a pedicel 3–20 mm (0.12–0.79 in) long with overlapping, bracts up to 7.0 mm (0.28 in) long. The sepals are joined at the base forming a tube 1.8–3.6 mm (0.071–0.142 in) long, with lobes 3–8 mm (0.12–0.31 in) long, the upper two lobes much broader than the lower three. There are egg-shaped or elliptic bracteoles up to 11.5 mm (0.45 in) long on the pedicel. The standard petal is yellow with a red base and 9.2–14.5 mm (0.36–0.57 in) long, the wings 8.8–11 mm (0.35–0.43 in) long, the keel red or reddish-purple and 8.8–11.0 mm (0.35–0.43 in) long. Flowering occurs from July to November and the fruit is an oblong pod 12–30 mm (0.47–1.18 in) long.

== Taxonomy and naming ==
Bossiaea eriocarpa was first formally described in 1837 by George Bentham in Enumeratio plantarum quas in Novae Hollandiae ora austro-occidentali ad fluvium Cygnorum et in sinu Regis Georgii collegit Carolus Liber Baro de Hügel from specimens collected near King George Sound. The specific epithet (eriocarpa) means "wool-fruited".

== Distribution and habitat ==
Common brown pea grows in a range of habitats in near-coastal areas from Zuytdorp Nature Reserve north of Kalbarri to near Albany in the Avon Wheatbelt, Esperance Plains, Geraldton Sandplains, Jarrah Forest and Swan Coastal Plain biogeographic regions of south-western Western Australia.

== Conservation status ==
Bossiaea eriocarpa is classified as "not threatened" by the Government of Western Australia Department of Parks and Wildlife.
