= Petrophile clavata =

Conservation status
- Priority Two — Poorly Known Taxa (DEC)

Scientific classification
- Kingdom: Plantae
- Clade: Tracheophytes
- Clade: Angiosperms
- Clade: Eudicots
- Order: Proteales
- Family: Proteaceae
- Genus: Petrophile
- Species: P. clavata

Binomial name
- Petrophile clavata Hislop & Rye

Species of shrub endemic to Western Australia

Petrophile clavata is a species of flowering plant in the family Proteaceae and is endemic to the south-west of Western Australia. It is a shrub with curved, needle-shaped, sharply-pointed leaves and spherical heads of hairy, cream-coloured to very pale yellow flowers.

== Description ==
Petrophile clavata is an erect or spreading shrub that typically grows to a height of 25–70 cm (9.8–27.6 in) and has hairy branchlets, especially when young. The leaves are cylindrical, 20–50 mm (0.79–1.97 in) long and 1–2 mm (0.039–0.079 in) wide with a sharply-pointed tip, erect near the base but turn downwards. The flowers are arranged on the ends of branchlets in sessile, spherical heads 30–45 mm (1.2–1.8 in) in diameter, with many narrow egg-shaped, densely hairy involucral bracts at the base. The flowers are 15–20 mm (0.59–0.79 in) long, cream-coloured to very pale yellow, and densely hairy. Flowering occurs from May to early August and the fruit is a nut, fused with others in a more or less spherical head 10–12 mm (0.39–0.47 in) long and 10–15 mm (0.39–0.59 in) wide.

== Taxonomy ==
Petrophile clavata was first formally described in 2002 by Michael Clyde Hislop and Barbara Lynette Rye in the journal Nuytsia from material collected by Alex George near Calingiri in 1984. The specific epithet (clavata) means "club-shaped", referring to the hairs on the pollen presenter.

== Distribution and habitat ==
This petrophile grows in heathland on sand and is known from near Coorow and Calingiri in the Avon Wheatbelt, Geraldton Sandplains and Jarrah Forest biogeographic regions in the southwest of Western Australia.

== Conservation status ==
Petrophile clavata is classified as "Priority Two" by the Western Australian Government Department of Parks and Wildlife meaning that it is poorly known and from only one or a few locations.
