= Petrophile juncifolia =

Scientific classification
- Kingdom: Plantae
- Clade: Tracheophytes
- Clade: Angiosperms
- Clade: Eudicots
- Order: Proteales
- Family: Proteaceae
- Genus: Petrophile
- Species: P. juncifolia

Binomial name
- Petrophile juncifolia Lindl.

Species of shrub endemic to Western Australia

Petrophile juncifolia is a species of flowering plant in the family Proteaceae and is endemic to southwestern Western Australia. It is a small, domed shrub with needle-shaped leaves, and heads of yellow to cream-coloured flowers.

== Description ==
Petrophile juncifolia is a shrub that typically grows to a height of 0.2–0.8 m (7.9 in – 2 ft 7.5 in). The leaves are needle-shaped but not sharply pointed, 150–300 mm (5.9–11.8 in) long, 1–1.5 mm (0.039–0.059 in) wide and sometimes curved. The flowers are yellow to cream-coloured, hairy, 15–22 mm (0.59–0.87 in) long and arranged in heads. Flowering occurs from October to November and the fruit is a nut, fused with others in a head 10–25 mm (0.39–0.98 in) long.

== Taxonomy ==
Petrophile juncifolia was first formally described in 1840 by John Lindley in A Sketch of the Vegetation of the Swan River Colony. The specific epithet (juncifolia) means "rush-leaved".

== Distribution and habitat ==
This petrophile mostly grows in winter-wet places between Perth and Waroona in the Jarrah Forest and Swan Coastal Plain biogeographic regions in the southwest of Western Australia.

== Conservation status ==
Petrophile juncifolia is classified as "not threatened" by the Government of Western Australia Department of Parks and Wildlife.
