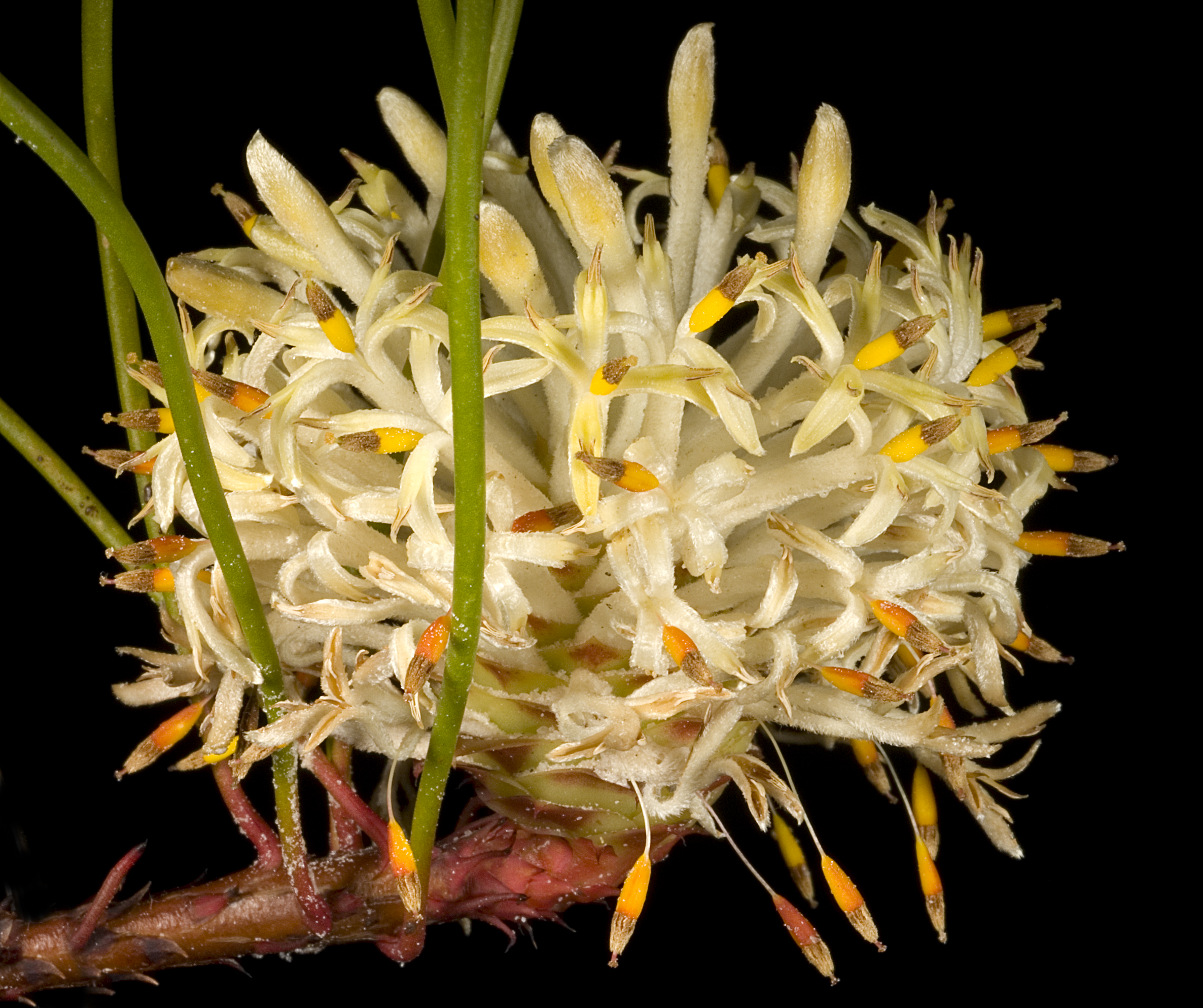

Scientific classification
- Kingdom: Plantae
- Clade: Tracheophytes
- Clade: Angiosperms
- Clade: Eudicots
- Order: Proteales
- Family: Proteaceae
- Genus: Petrophile
- Species: P. prostrata

Binomial name
- Petrophile prostrata Rye & Hislop

= Petrophile prostrata =

Species of shrub endemic to Western Australia

Petrophile prostrata is a species of flowering plant in the family Proteaceae and is endemic to southwestern Western Australia. It is a prostrate shrub with needle-shaped but usually not sharply-pointed leaves and spherical heads of hairy, pale yellow or cream-coloured flowers.

== Description ==
Petrophile prostrata is a prostrate shrub that typically grows to a height of 20–30 cm (7.9–11.8 in) and has branches that are often covered by sand. The leaves are needle-shaped, 200–320 mm (7.9–12.6 in) long and 1–2 mm (0.039–0.079 in) wide, sometimes crowded on one side of the stems and have a slightly hooked point 1.5 mm (0.059 in) long on the tip. The flowers are mostly arranged on the ends of branchlets in spherical heads 35–55 mm (1.4–2.2 in) in diameter, with egg-shaped involucral bracts scattered along the stems under the head. The flowers are 18–27 mm (0.71–1.06 in) long, pale yellow or cream-coloured, and hairy. Flowering mainly occurs from late August to mid-November and the fruit is a nut, fused with others in an oval head 15–25 mm (0.59–0.98 in) long in diameter.

== Taxonomy ==
Petrophile prostrata was first formally described in 2005 by Barbara Lynette Rye and Michael Clyde Hislop in the journal Nuytsia from material collected in the Fitzgerald River National Park in 1999. The specific epithet (prostrata) means "lying on the ground".

== Distribution and habitat ==
This petrophile grows in heathland and shrubland from near Jerramungup to near Hopetoun, including in many locations in the Fitzgerald River National Park.

== Conservation status ==
Petrophile prostrata is classified as "not threatened" by the Western Australian Government Department of Parks and Wildlife.
