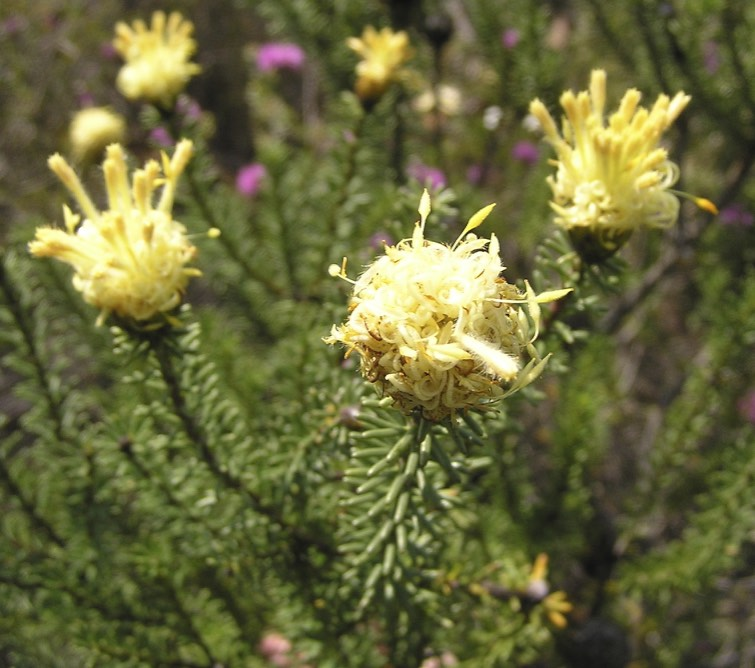
- East of Gairdner

Scientific classification
- Kingdom: Plantae
- Clade: Tracheophytes
- Clade: Angiosperms
- Clade: Eudicots
- Order: Proteales
- Family: Proteaceae
- Genus: Petrophile
- Species: P. cyathiforma

Binomial name
- Petrophile cyathiforma Foreman

= Petrophile cyathiforma =

Species of shrub endemic to Western Australia

Petrophile cyathiforma is a species of flowering plant in the family Proteaceae and is endemic to southwestern Western Australia. It is a small shrub with needle-shaped, sharply-pointed leaves and cup-shaped heads of glabrous, bright yellow flowers.

== Description ==
Petrophile cyathiforma is a shrub that typically grows to a height of 30–65 cm (12–26 in) and has hairy young branchlets that become glabrous with age. The leaves are needle-shaped, sharply pointed and 10–15 mm (0.39–0.59 in) long. The flowers are arranged on the ends of branchlets in sessile, cup-shaped heads up to 15 mm (0.59 in) in diameter, with hairy, narrow egg-shaped involucral bracts at the base. The flowers are about 20 mm (0.79 in) long, bright yellow and glabrous. Flowering occurs from September to December and the fruit is a nut, fused with others in a hemispherical head up to 15–20 mm (0.59–0.79 in) in diameter with persistent bracts at the base.

== Taxonomy ==
Petrophile cyathiforma was first formally described in 1995 by Donald Bruce Foreman in Flora of Australia from material collected near Hyden in 1966. The specific epithet (cyathiforma) means "cup-shaped", referring to shape of the flower head, as a result of the bracts at its base.

== Distribution and habitat ==
This petrophile grows in low mallee, low scrub and heath and on sandplain from near Corrigin to the Fitzgerald River National Park in the Avon Wheatbelt, Coolgardie, Esperance Plains and Mallee biogeographic regions of southwestern Western Australia.

== Conservation status ==
Petrophile cyathiforma is classified as "not threatened" by the Western Australian Government Department of Parks and Wildlife.
