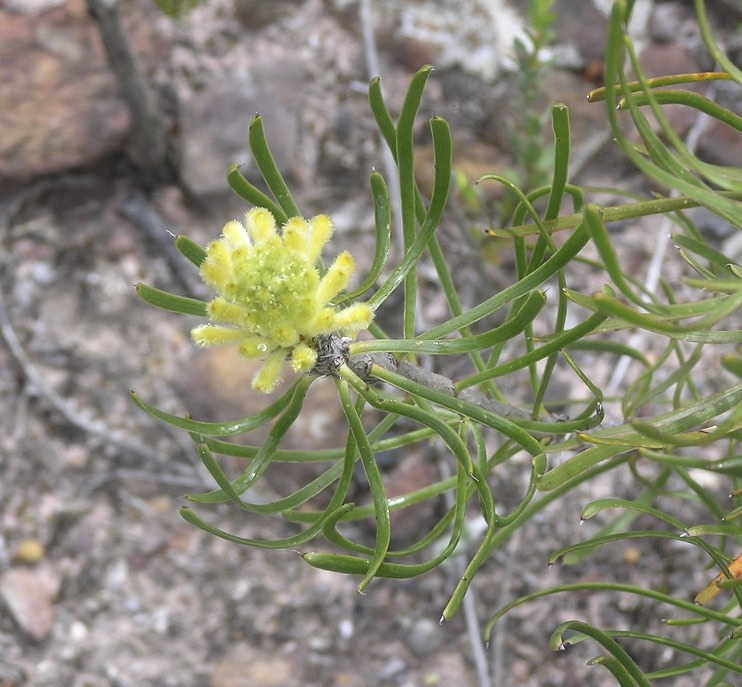
- In the Stirling Range National Park

Scientific classification
- Kingdom: Plantae
- Clade: Tracheophytes
- Clade: Angiosperms
- Clade: Eudicots
- Order: Proteales
- Family: Proteaceae
- Genus: Petrophile
- Species: P. helicophylla

Binomial name
- Petrophile helicophylla Foreman

= Petrophile helicophylla =

Species of shrub endemic to Western Australia

Petrophile helicophylla is a species of flowering plant in the family Proteaceae and is endemic to southwestern Western Australia. It is a prostrate, spreading shrub with twisted, needle-like leaves and heads of hairy white to creamy-white or pale pink flowers.

== Description ==
Petrophile helicophylla is a shrub that typically grows to 20–35 cm (7.9–13.8 in) high, 160 cm (63 in) wide and has glabrous branchlets and leaves. The leaves are needle-shaped 150–300 mm (5.9–11.8 in) long and spirally twisted. The flowers are arranged on the ends of branchlets in heads 25–30 mm (0.98–1.18 in) long and sessile or on peduncles 6–12 mm (0.24–0.47 in) long, with a few tapering involucral bracts at the base. The flowers are about 35 mm (1.4 in) long, white to creamy-white or pale pink and hairy. Flowering mainly occurs from October to February and the fruit is a nut, fused with others in an elliptic to spherical head 15–25 mm (0.59–0.98 in) long.

== Taxonomy ==
Petrophile helicophylla was first formally described in 1990 by Donald Bruce Foreman in Muelleria from material he collected near Ravensthorpe in 1979. The specific epithet (helicophylla) means "coil-leaved".

== Distribution and habitat ==
This petrophile grows in low heath, scrub and woodland on sand plains and near salt pans near Ravensthorpe and Jerramungup in the Esperance Plains and Mallee biogeographic regions of southwestern Western Australia.

== Conservation status ==
Petrophile helicophylla is classified as "not threatened" by the Western Australian Government Department of Parks and Wildlife.
