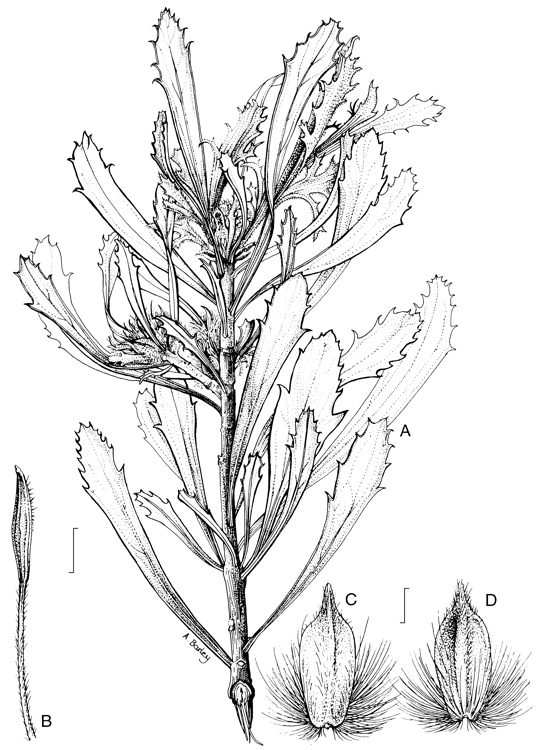
- A = branchlet; B = style; C&D = lower and upper side of nut

Scientific classification
- Kingdom: Plantae
- Clade: Tracheophytes
- Clade: Angiosperms
- Clade: Eudicots
- Order: Proteales
- Family: Proteaceae
- Genus: Petrophile
- Species: P. aculeata

Binomial name
- Petrophile aculeata Foreman

= Petrophile aculeata =

Species of shrub endemic to Western Australia

Petrophile aculeata is a species of flowering plant in the family Proteaceae and is endemic to the south-west of Western Australia. It is a small shrub with narrow egg-shaped leaves with the narrower end towards the base and with irregular teeth near the end, and more or less spherical heads of hairy yellow flowers.

== Description ==
Petrophile aculeata is a shrub that typically grows to a height of 30–50 cm (12–20 in) and has hairy branchlets and leaves but that become glabrous with age. The leaves are narrow egg-shaped with the narrower end towards the base, 40–90 mm (1.6–3.5 in) long and 7–20 mm (0.28–0.79 in) wide with irregular teeth in the upper half. The flowers are arranged in sessile, more or less spherical heads 10–12 mm (0.39–0.47 in) in diameter, with hairy grey involucral bracts at the base. The flowers are about 11 mm (0.43 in) long, yellow and hairy. Flowering occurs from October to November and the fruit is a nut, fused with others in a more or less spherical head up to 12 mm (0.47 in) in diameter.

== Taxonomy ==
Petrophile aculeata was first formally described in 1995 by Donald Bruce Foreman in Flora of Australia. The specific epithet (aculeata) means "prickly", referring to "the prickly appearance and feel of the specimens".

== Distribution and habitat ==
This petrophile grows in low heath in the Alexander Morrison National Park near Coorow and in a separate population south of Eneabba where it grows in sandy soils over laterite in the Avon Wheatbelt and Geraldton Sandplains biogeographic regions of southwestern Western Australia.

== Conservation status ==
Petrophile aculeata is classified as "not threatened" by the Western Australian Government Department of Parks and Wildlife.
