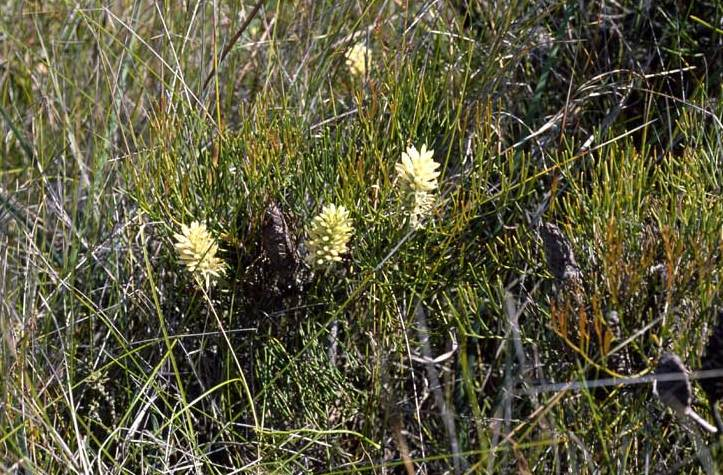
- Near Coolum Beach

Scientific classification
- Kingdom: Plantae
- Clade: Tracheophytes
- Clade: Angiosperms
- Clade: Eudicots
- Order: Proteales
- Family: Proteaceae
- Genus: Petrophile
- Species: P. shirleyae

Binomial name
- Petrophile shirleyae F.M.Bailey

= Petrophile shirleyae =

Species of shrub native to Queensland, Australia

Petrophile shirleyae is a species of flowering plant in the family Proteaceae and is endemic to Queensland. It is a shrub with pinnate, needle-shaped, sharply-pointed leaves, and narrow oval heads of silky-hairy white to pale cream-coloured flowers.

== Description ==
Petrophile shirleyae is an erect shrub that typically grows to a height of 0.3–1.2 m (1 ft 0 in – 3 ft 11 in) and has more or less glabrous leaves and branchlets. The leaves are bipinnate or tripinnate, 80–200 mm (3.1–7.9 in) long on a petiole 30–50 mm (1.2–2.0 in) long, with pinnae 30–65 mm (1.2–2.6 in) long. The flowers are arranged on the ends of branchlets in narrow oval heads 30–55 mm (1.2–2.2 in) long, sometimes in pairs, with a few broadly egg-shaped involucral bracts at the base. The flowers are up to about 12 mm (0.47 in) long, silky-hairy and white to pale cream-coloured. Flowering occurs from October to February and the fruit is a nut, fused with others in an oval head up to about 80 mm (3.1 in) long.

== Taxonomy ==
Petrophile shirleyae was first formally described in 1891 by Frederick Manson Bailey in the Botany Bulletin of the Department of Agriculture, Queensland from material collected by John Francis Shirley on Moreton Island. The specific epithet (shirleyae) honours the wife of the collector of the type material.

== Distribution and habitat ==
Petrophile shirleyae grows in sandy heath and forest in near-coastal areas of south-eastern Queensland.

== Conservation status ==
This petrophile is classified as of "least concern" under the Queensland Government Nature Conservation Act 1992.
