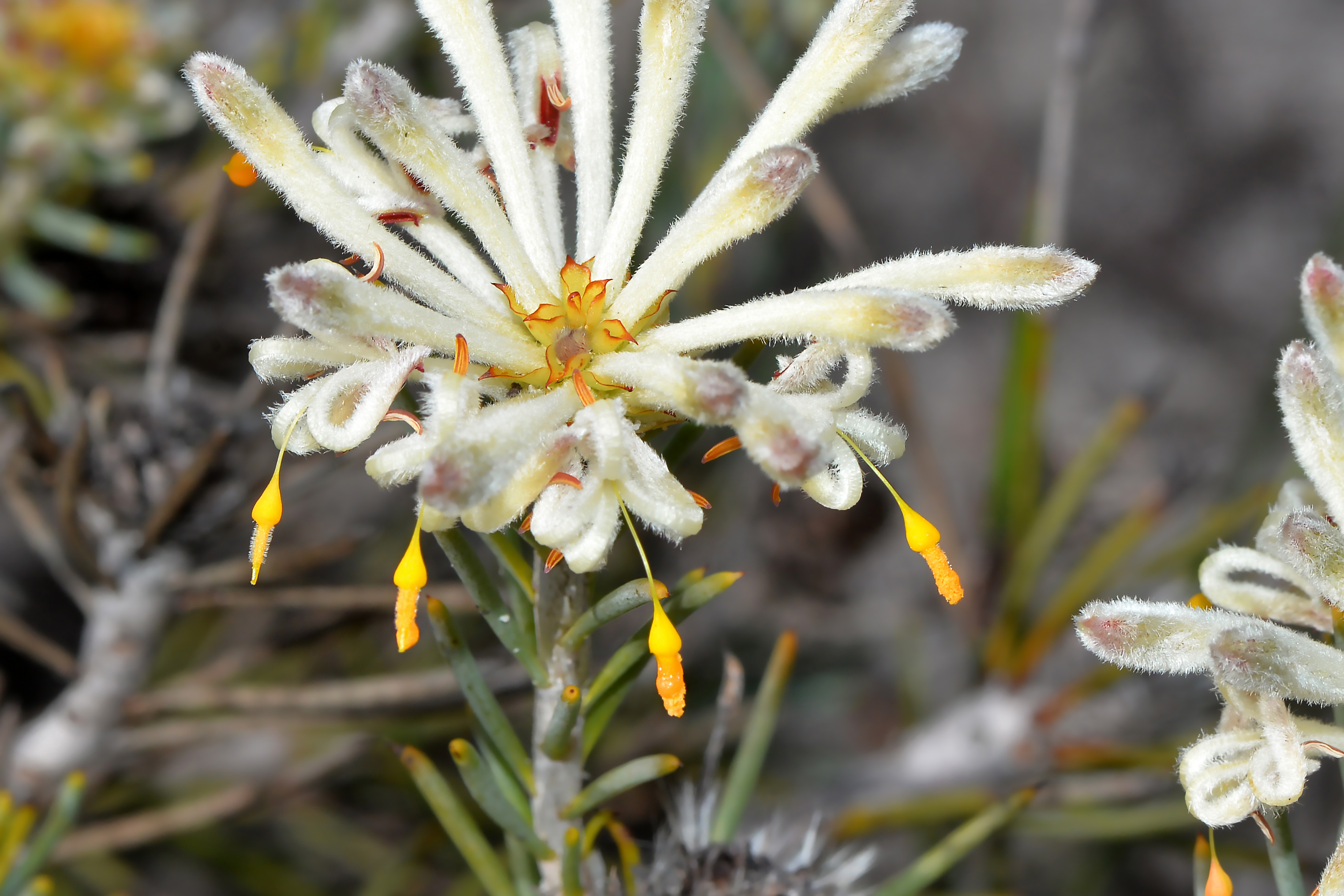

Scientific classification
- Kingdom: Plantae
- Clade: Tracheophytes
- Clade: Angiosperms
- Clade: Eudicots
- Order: Proteales
- Family: Proteaceae
- Genus: Petrophile
- Species: P. brevifolia

Binomial name
- Petrophile brevifolia Lindl.

Synonyms
- Petrophila brevifolia Lindl. orth. var.; Petrophila media var. brevifolia Domin orth. var.; Petrophile media var. brevifolia (Lindl.) Domin

= Petrophile brevifolia =

Species of shrub endemic to Western Australia

Petrophile brevifolia is a species of flowering plant in the family Proteaceae and is endemic to the south-west of Western Australia. It is a shrub with cylindrical, sharply-pointed leaves, and spherical heads of hairy yellow, cream-coloured or white flowers.

== Description ==
Petrophile brevifolia is a low, multi-stemmed, erect, or spreading, non-lignotuberous shrub that typically grows to a height of 0.2–2 m (7.9 in – 6 ft 6.7 in) and has glabrous branchlets and leaves. The leaves are needle-shaped, 10–50 mm (0.39–1.97 in) long with a sharply-pointed tip about 2 mm (0.079 in) long. The flowers are arranged on the ends of branchlets in sessile, spherical heads 10–15 mm (0.39–0.59 in) in diameter, with many linear or tapering involucral bracts at the base. The flowers are 12–20 mm (0.47–0.79 in) long, yellow, creamy yellow or white and hairy. Flowering occurs from June to December and the fruit is a nut, fused with others in an oval to spherical head about 10–20 mm (0.39–0.79 in) long.

== Taxonomy ==
Petrophile brevifolia was first formally described in 1840 by John Lindley in A Sketch of the Vegetation of the Swan River Colony. The specific epithet (brevifolia) means "short-leaved".

== Distribution and habitat ==
This petrophile grows in shrubland, heath and woodland and is widespread and common from Kalbarri National Park to Ongerup in the southwest of Western Australia.

== Conservation status ==
Petrophile brevifolia is classified as "not threatened" by the Government of Western Australia Department of Parks and Wildlife.
