= Petrophile pilostyla =

Scientific classification
- Kingdom: Plantae
- Clade: Embryophytes
- Clade: Tracheophytes
- Clade: Spermatophytes
- Clade: Angiosperms
- Clade: Eudicots
- Order: Proteales
- Family: Proteaceae
- Genus: Petrophile
- Species: P. pilostyla

Binomial name
- Petrophile pilostyla Rye & Hislop

Species of shrub endemic to Western Australia

Petrophile pilostyla is a species of flowering plant in the family Proteaceae and is endemic to southwestern Western Australia. It is a shrub with needle-shaped, sharply-pointed leaves and spherical heads of hairy, cream-coloured or pale yellow flowers.

== Description ==
Petrophile pilostyla is a shrub that typically grows to a height of 0.4–1.7 m (1 ft 4 in – 5 ft 7 in) and has prominently ribbed, glabrous branchlets. The leaves are needle-shaped, sometimes strongly curved or s-shaped, 40–110 mm (1.6–4.3 in) long and 1–1.5 mm (0.039–0.059 in) wide with a sharply-pointed tip. The flowers are mostly arranged on the ends of branchlets in sessile, spherical heads 22–35 mm (0.87–1.38 in) in diameter, with narrow egg-shaped, glabrous involucral bracts at the base. The flowers are 9.5–17 mm (0.37–0.67 in) long, cream-coloured or pale yellow, and hairy. Flowering mainly occurs from July to early September and the fruit is a nut, fused with others in a more or less spherical head 10–20 mm (0.39–0.79 in) in diameter.

== Taxonomy ==
Petrophile pilostyla was first formally described in 2005 by Barbara Lynette Rye and Michael Clyde Hislop in the journal Nuytsia from material collected near Binnu in 2003. The specific epithet (pilostyla) means "having a hairy style".

In the same paper, Rye and Hislop described three subspecies and the names are accepted by the Australian Plant Census:

- Petrophile pilostyla subsp. austrina Rye & Hislop;
- Petrophile pilostyla Rye & Hislop subsp. pilostyla;
- Petrophile pilostyla subsp. syntoma Rye & Hislop.

== Distribution and habitat ==
This petrophile is found on low hills where it grows in sandy-gravelly soils over limestone or laterite between Tamala Station near Shark Bay and Watheroo National Park in the Geraldton Sandplains biogeographic region.

== Conservation status ==
Petrophile pilostyla is classified as "not threatened" by the Western Australian Government Department of Parks and Wildlife but subspecies syntoma is classified as "Priority Two" by the Western Australian Government Department of Parks and Wildlife meaning that it is poorly known and from only one or a few locations.
