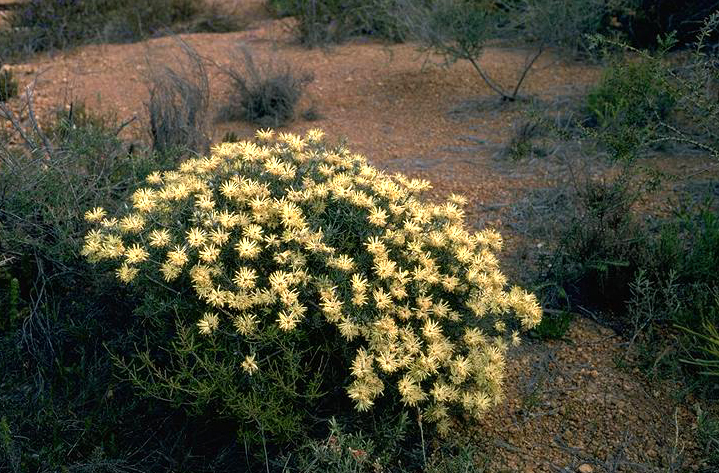
- Near Geraldton

Scientific classification
- Kingdom: Plantae
- Clade: Tracheophytes
- Clade: Angiosperms
- Clade: Eudicots
- Order: Proteales
- Family: Proteaceae
- Genus: Petrophile
- Species: P. megalostegia

Binomial name
- Petrophile megalostegia F.Muell.

Synonyms
- Petrophila megalostegia F.Muell. orth. var.

= Petrophile megalostegia =

Species of shrub endemic to Western Australia

Petrophile megalostegia is a species of flowering plant in the family Proteaceae and is endemic to southwestern Western Australia. It is a shrub with needle-shaped or flattened, sometimes S-shaped leaves with a sharply-pointed tip, and more or less cylindrical heads of silky-hairy, yellow to cream-coloured flowers.

== Description ==
Petrophile megalostegia is an erect shrub that typically grows to a height of 0.3–1 m (1 ft 0 in – 3 ft 3 in) high and has glabrous branchlets and leaves. The leaves are cylindrical or flattened, straight or S-shaped, 25–85 mm (0.98–3.35 in) long and sharply pointed. The flowers are arranged on the ends of branchlets in more or less spherical heads surrounded by glabrous egg-shaped or elliptic involucral bracts. The flowers are up to 30 mm (1.2 in) long, yellow, cream-coloured or creamy yellow and silky-hairy. Flowering mainly occurs from August to October and the fruit is a nut, fused with others in an oval head up to 15 mm (0.59 in) long.

== Taxonomy ==
Petrophile megalostegia was first formally described in 1876 by Ferdinand von Mueller in the Fragmenta Phytographiae Australiae from material collected by James Drummond. The specific epithet (megalostegia) means "large roof, tent or house" referring to the involucral bracts.

== Distribution and habitat ==
This petrophile is found between Mullewa, Eneabba and Watheroo where it grows in heath and shrubland in the Avon Wheatbelt, Geraldton Sandplains and Swan Coastal Plain biogeographic regions of southwestern Western Australia.

== Conservation status ==
Petrophile incurvata is classified as "not threatened" by the Western Australian Government Department of Parks and Wildlife.
