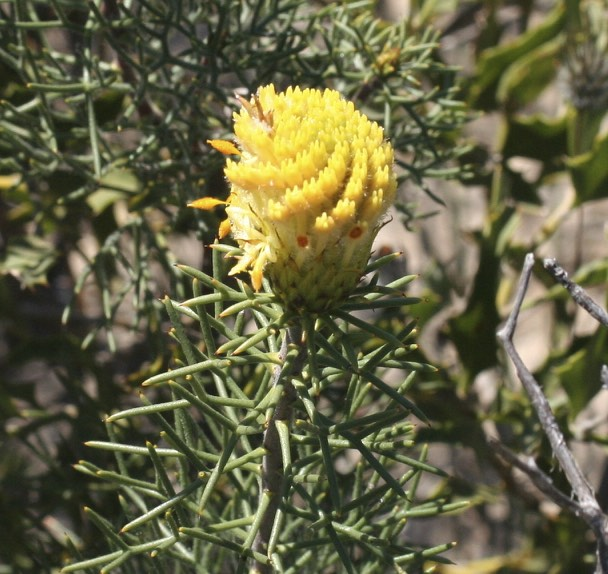
- Near Eneabba

Scientific classification
- Kingdom: Plantae
- Clade: Tracheophytes
- Clade: Angiosperms
- Clade: Eudicots
- Order: Proteales
- Family: Proteaceae
- Genus: Petrophile
- Species: P. drummondii

Binomial name
- Petrophile drummondii Meisn.

Synonyms
- Petrophila triternata Meisn. orth. var.; Petrophile triternata Kippist ex Meisn.

= Petrophile drummondii =

Species of shrub endemic to Western Australia

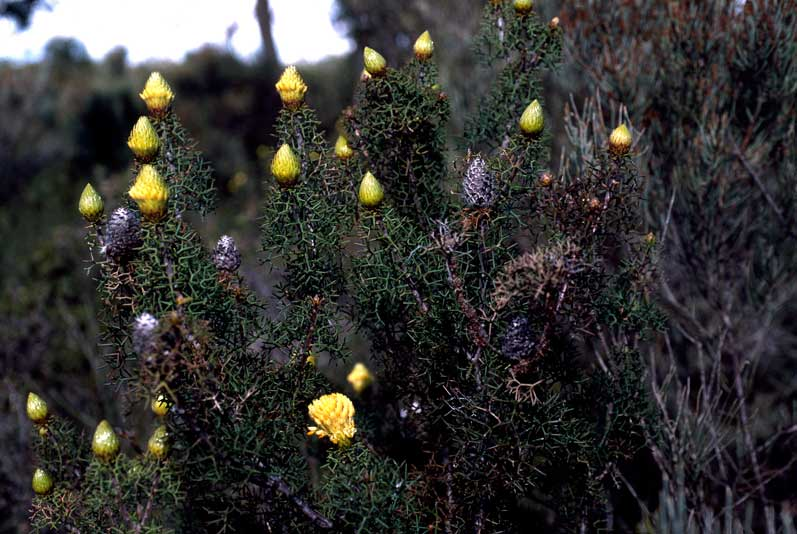
Habit, near Eneabba

Petrophile drummondii is a species of flowering plant in the family Proteaceae and is endemic to southwestern Western Australia. It is a shrub with rigid, pinnate leaves with needle-shaped, sharply-pointed pinnae, and spherical heads of hairy, fragrant, yellow flowers.

== Description ==
Petrophile drummondii is a shrub that typically grows to a height of 1.0–1.5 m (3 ft 3 in – 4 ft 11 in) and has more or less glabrous young branchlets. The leaves are 20–50 mm (0.79–1.97 in) long on a petiole 10–26 mm (0.39–1.02 in) long and pinnate with rigid, sharply-pointed and needle-like pinnae about 20 mm (0.79 in) long. The flowers are arranged on the ends of branchlets in sessile, more or less spherical heads 30–40 mm (1.2–1.6 in) long, with many glabrous, egg-shaped to lance-shaped involucral bracts at the base. The flowers are about 20 mm (0.79 in) long, fragrant, sticky, yellow and covered with short hairs. Flowering occurs from August to December and the fruit is a nut, fused with others in an oval head 25–30 mm (0.98–1.18 in) long.

== Taxonomy ==
Petrophile drummondii was first formally described in 1845 by Carl Meissner in Johann Georg Christian Lehmann's book Plantae Preissianae from material collected by James Drummond near the Swan River in 1839. The specific epithet (drummondii) honours the collector of the type specimens.

== Distribution and habitat ==
This petrophile grows in heath and shrubland and is scattered throughout the Avon Wheatbelt, Geraldton Sandplains, Jarrah Forest and Swan Coastal Plain biogeographic regions of southwestern Western Australia.

== Conservation status ==
Petrophile drummondii is classified as "not threatened" by the Western Australian Government Department of Parks and Wildlife.
