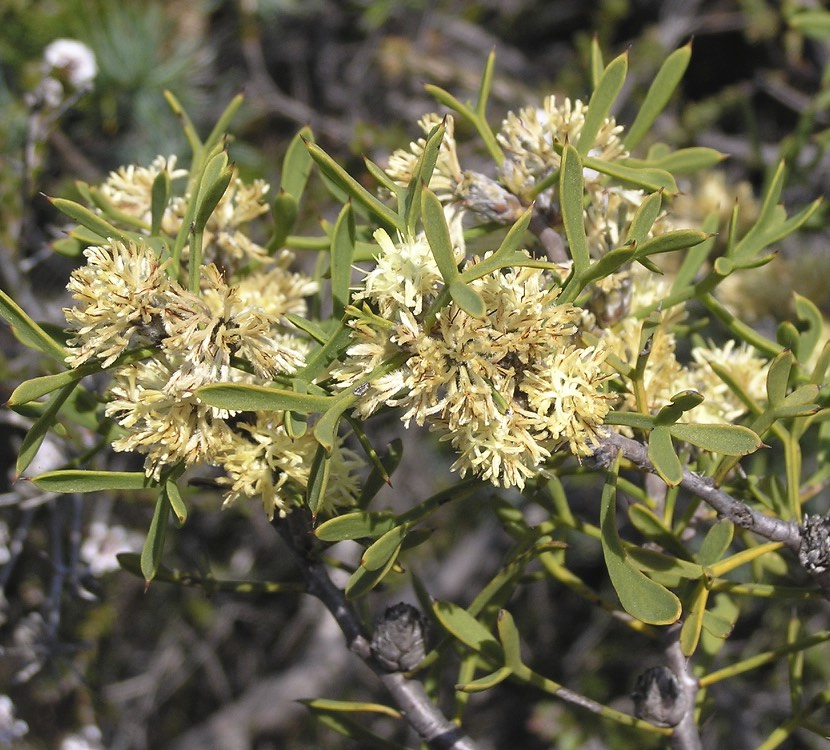
- In the Fitzgerald River National Park

Scientific classification
- Kingdom: Plantae
- Clade: Tracheophytes
- Clade: Angiosperms
- Clade: Eudicots
- Order: Proteales
- Family: Proteaceae
- Genus: Petrophile
- Species: P. squamata

Binomial name
- Petrophile squamata R.Br.

Synonyms
- List: Petrophila colorata Meisn. orth. var.; Petrophila cunninghamii Meisn. orth. var.; Petrophila cunninghamii var. brachyphylla Meisn. orth. var.; Petrophila cunninghamii var. gracilis Meisn. orth. var.; Petrophila cunninghamii var. major Meisn. orth. var.; Petrophila propinqua R.Br. orth. var.; Petrophila propinqua var. sericiflora Benth. orth. var.; Petrophila trifida R.Br. orth. var.; Petrophile colorata Meisn.; Petrophile cunninghamii Meisn.; Petrophile cunninghamii var. brachyphylla Meisn.; Petrophile cunninghamii Meisn. var. cunninghamii; Petrophile cunninghamii var. gracilis Meisn.; Petrophile cunninghamii var. major Meisn.; Petrophile gracilis Endl. nom. inval., nom. nud.; Petrophile propinqua R.Br.; Petrophile propinqua R.Br. var. propinqua; Petrophile propinqua var. sericiflora Benth.; Petrophile trifida R.Br.; Protea squamata (R.Br.) Poir.; Protea trifida (R.Br.) Poir.

= Petrophile squamata =

Species of shrub endemic to Western Australia

Petrophile squamata is a species of flowering plant in the family Proteaceae and is endemic to the south-west of Western Australia. It is a shrub usually with deeply divided, three-lobed and sharply-pointed leaves, and oval heads of hairy yellow or creamy-yellow flowers.

== Description ==
Petrophile squamata is an erect shrub that typically grows to a height of 0.3–3 m (1 ft 0 in – 9 ft 10 in). The leaves are up to 65 mm (2.6 in) long on a petiole up to 28 mm (1.1 in) long, and deeply divided with three sharply-pointed lobes that often themselves have three to five lobes and are 3–35 mm (0.12–1.38 in) long. The flowers are arranged in leaf axils in sessile, oval heads 5–6 mm (0.20–0.24 in) long, with small deciduous involucral bracts at the base. The flowers are 8–10 mm (0.31–0.39 in) long, yellow or creamy-yellow and hairy. Flowering mainly occurs from July to December and the fruit is a nut, fused with others in a more or less oval head about 16 mm (0.63 in) long.

== Taxonomy ==
Petrophile squamata was first formally described in 1810 by Robert Brown in Transactions of the Linnean Society of London. The specific epithet (squamata) means "scaly", referring to the involucral bracts.

== Distribution and habitat ==
Petrophile squamata is a common and widespread species growing in sandy heath, shrubland or woodland between Perth and Israelite Bay.

== Conservation status ==
This petrophile is classified as "not threatened" by the Western Australian Government Department of Parks and Wildlife.
