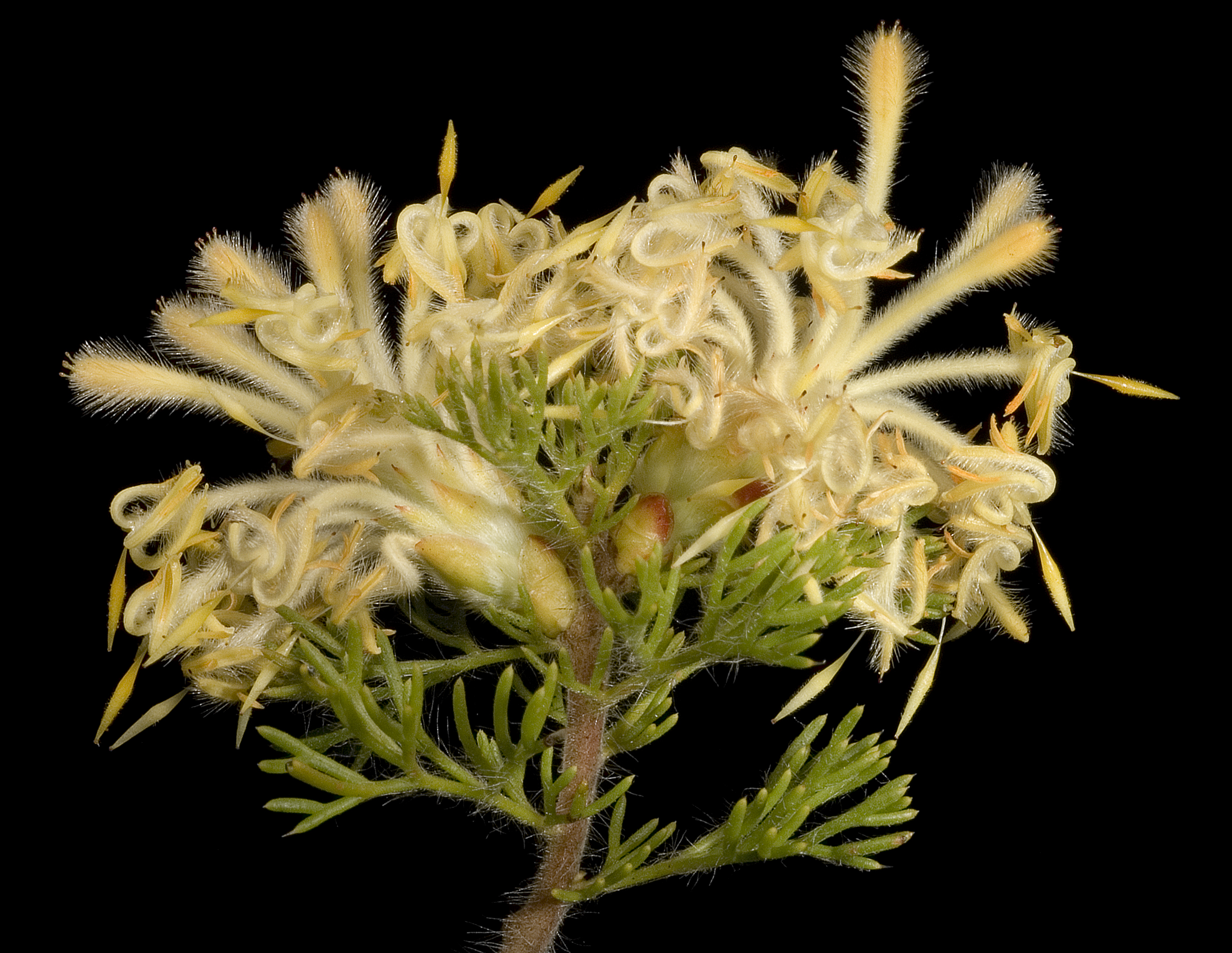

Scientific classification
- Kingdom: Plantae
- Clade: Tracheophytes
- Clade: Angiosperms
- Clade: Eudicots
- Order: Proteales
- Family: Proteaceae
- Genus: Petrophile
- Species: P. serruriae

Binomial name
- Petrophile serruriae R.Br.

Synonyms
- Petrophila glanduligera Lindl. orth. var.; Petrophile glanduligera Lindl.

= Petrophile serruriae =

Species of shrub endemic to Western Australia

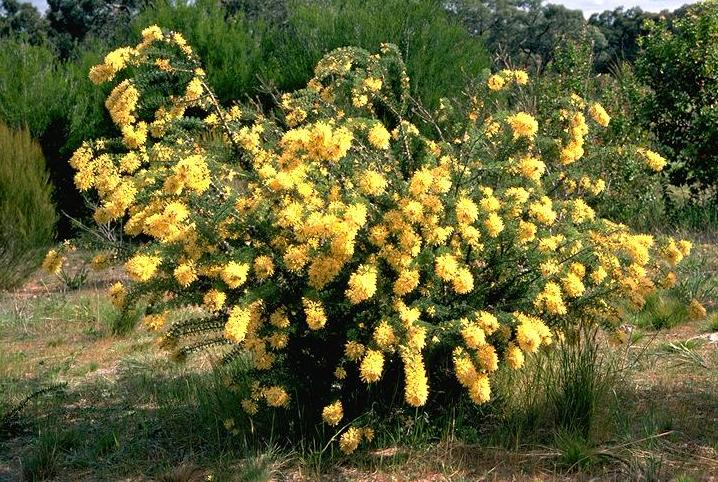
Habit

Petrophile serruriae is a species of flowering plant in the family Proteaceae and is endemic to southwestern Western Australia. It is a shrub with crowded, pinnate, needle-shaped, sharply-pointed leaves, and oval heads of silky-hairy yellow, greyish mauve to pink flowers.

== Description ==
Petrophile serruriae is an erect or spreading shrub that typically grows to a height of 0.2–1.5 m (7.9 in – 4 ft 11.1 in). It has silky-hairy branchlets and leaves but does not form a lignotuber. The leaves are bipinnate or tripinnate, 15–34 mm (0.59–1.34 in) long on a petiole 2–10 mm (0.079–0.394 in) long, with mostly twenty-seven to thirty-five needle-shaped, sharply-pointed lobes. The flowers are arranged on the ends of branchlets and in leaf axils with oval heads about 10 mm (0.39 in) in diameter, with a few deciduous involucral bracts at the base. The flowers are 13–16 mm (0.51–0.63 in) long, silky-hairy and yellow, greyish mauve to pink. Flowering mainly occurs from July to December and the fruit is a nut, fused with others in an oval to spherical head 10–12 mm (0.39–0.47 in) in diameter.

== Taxonomy ==
Petrophile serruriae was first formally described in 1830 by Robert Brown in the Supplementum to his Prodromus Florae Novae Hollandiae et Insulae Van Diemen from material collected by William Baxter near King George Sound in 1823. The specific epithet (serruriae) means "like a plant in the genus Serruria".

== Distribution and habitat ==
Petrophile serruriae is common in coastal limestone and is widespread from near Geraldton to near Albany in the south-west of Western Australia.

== Conservation status ==
This petrophile is classified as "not threatened" by the Western Australian Government Department of Parks and Wildlife.
