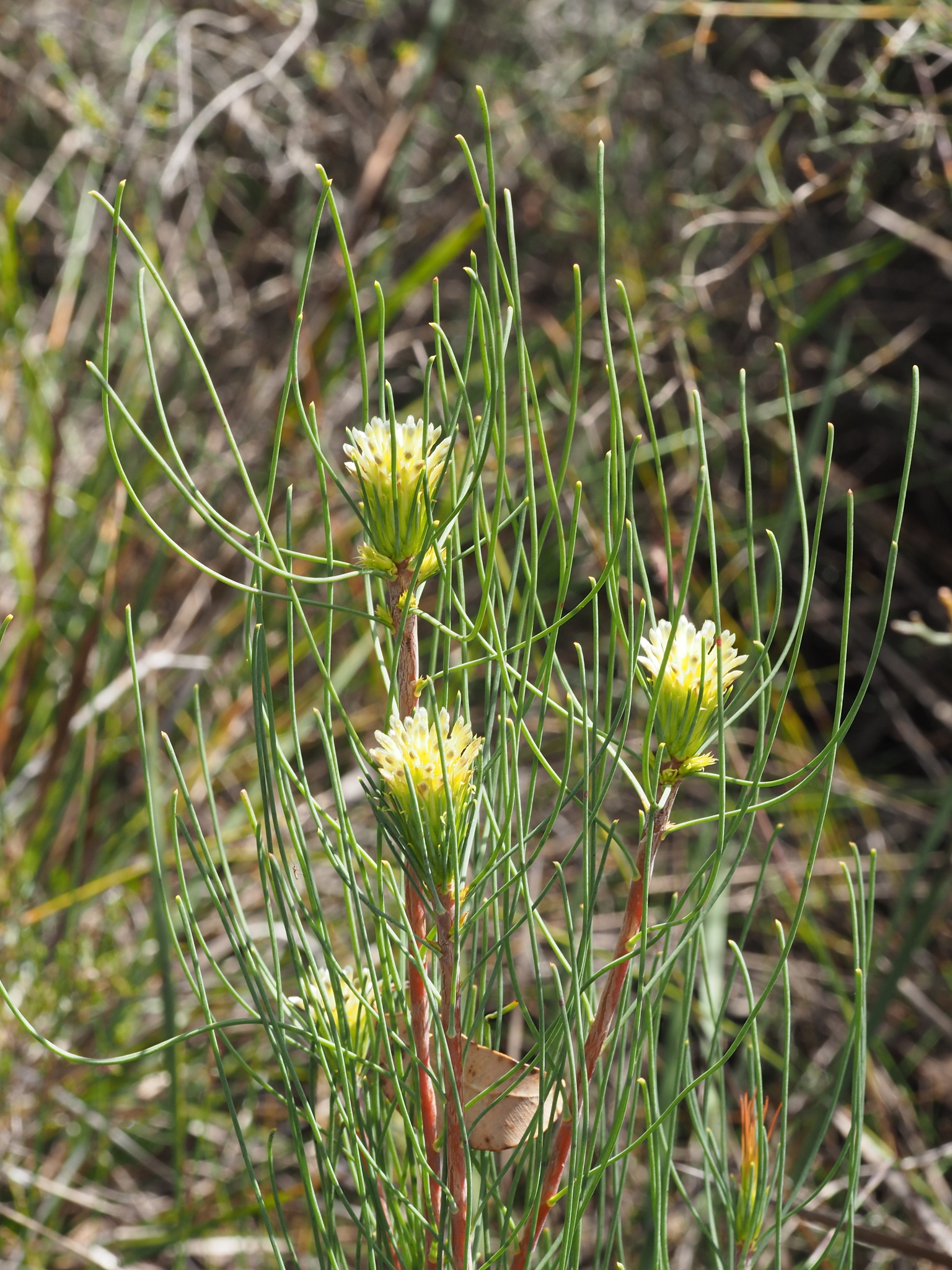
- Near Redmond

Scientific classification
- Kingdom: Plantae
- Clade: Tracheophytes
- Clade: Angiosperms
- Clade: Eudicots
- Order: Proteales
- Family: Proteaceae
- Genus: Petrophile
- Species: P. acicularis

Binomial name
- Petrophile acicularis R.Br.

Synonyms
- Protea acicularis (R.Br.) Poir. nom. inval., nom. nud.

= Petrophile acicularis =

Species of flowering plant

Petrophile acicularis is a species of flowering plant in the family Proteaceae and is endemic to the south-west of Western Australia. It is a low, tufted shrub with cylindrical leaves and oval heads of densely hairy, cream-coloured flowers.

== Description ==
Petrophile acicularis is a tufted shrub that typically grows to a height of 15–70 cm (5.9–27.6 in) and has glabrous branchlets and leaves. The leaves are cylindrical, 50–180 mm (2.0–7.1 in) long and 1–1.5 mm (0.039–0.059 in) wide. The flowers are arranged in sessile, oval heads about 15 mm (0.59 in) long, with many pointed involucral bracts at the base. The flowers are about 10 mm (0.39 in) long, cream-coloured and densely hairy. Flowering occurs from September to October, and the fruit is a nut, fused with others in a more or less spherical head 15–20 mm (0.59–0.79 in) long. This petrophile differs from similar species in having prominently striated cone scales.

== Taxonomy ==
Petrophile acicularis was first formally described in 1810 by Robert Brown in Transactions of the Linnean Society of London. The specific epithet (acicularis) means "needle-pointed", referring to the leaves.

== Distribution and habitat ==
This petrophile usually grows in sand and is found between the Scott River, Two Peoples Bay and Manjimup in the Jarrah Forest and Warren biogeographic regions in the south-west of Western Australia.

== Conservation status ==
Petrophile acicularis is classified as "not threatened" by the Western Australian Government Department of Parks and Wildlife.
