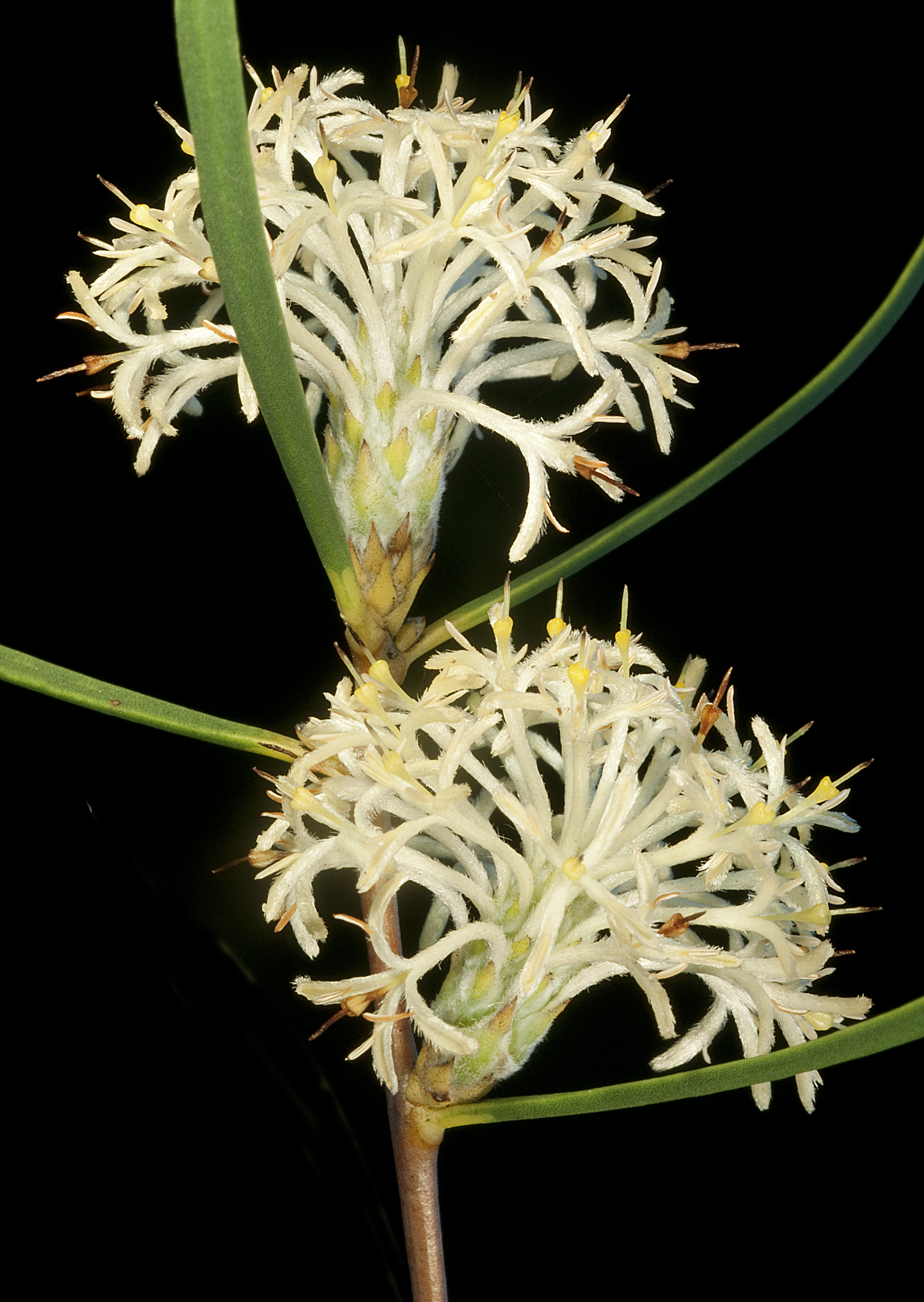

Scientific classification
- Kingdom: Plantae
- Clade: Tracheophytes
- Clade: Angiosperms
- Clade: Eudicots
- Order: Proteales
- Family: Proteaceae
- Genus: Petrophile
- Species: P. heterophylla

Binomial name
- Petrophile heterophylla Lindl.

Synonyms
- List: Petrophila heterophylla Lindl. orth. var.; Petrophila heterophylla var. angustifolia Meisn. orth. var.; Petrophila heterophylla var. intermedia Meisn orth. var.; Petrophila heterophylla var. latifolia Meisn. orth. var.; Petrophile heterophylla var. angustifolia Meisn.; Petrophile heterophylla Lindl. var. heterophylla; Petrophile heterophylla var. intermedia Meisn.; Petrophile heterophylla var. latifolia Meisn.

= Petrophile heterophylla =

Species of shrub endemic to Western Australia

Petrophile heterophylla, commonly known as the variable-leaved conebush, is a species of flowering plant in the family Proteaceae and is endemic to southwestern Western Australia. It is a shrub with variably shaped, sometimes pinnately-divided leaves, and oval heads of silky-hairy, yellow to cream-coloured flowers.

== Description ==
Petrophile heterophylla is a spindly, non-lignotuberous shrub that typically grows to a height of 0.5–2 m (1 ft 8 in – 6 ft 7 in) and has glabrous branchlets and leaves. The leaves are more or less flattened, mostly about 140 mm (5.5 in) long and 2–6 mm (0.079–0.236 in) wide, linear to lance-shaped with a sharply-pointed tip, but sometimes pinnately-divided or lobed. The flowers are mostly arranged in leaf axils, sometimes on the ends of branchlets in sessile, oval heads 6–8 mm (0.24–0.31 in) long, with many overlapping involucral bracts at the base. The flowers are 10–15 mm (0.39–0.59 in) long, yellow to cream-coloured and silky-hairy. Flowering occurs from August to October and the fruit is a nut, fused with others in an oval to oblong head about 12 mm (0.47 in) in diameter.

== Taxonomy ==
Petrophile heterophylla was first formally described in 1840 by John Lindley in A Sketch of the Vegetation of the Swan River Colony. The specific epithet (heterophylla) means "different-leaved".

== Distribution and habitat ==
This petrophile grows in low heath, dense scrub, open woodland and forest in the Stirling Range, east to an area between Ravensthorpe and Esperance and north to near Chittering, in the southwest of Western Australia.

== Conservation status ==
Petrophile heterophylla is classified as "not threatened" by the Government of Western Australia Department of Parks and Wildlife.
