= Petrophile globifera =

Conservation status
- Priority Three — Poorly Known Taxa (DEC)

Scientific classification
- Kingdom: Plantae
- Clade: Tracheophytes
- Clade: Angiosperms
- Clade: Eudicots
- Order: Proteales
- Family: Proteaceae
- Genus: Petrophile
- Species: P. globifera

Binomial name
- Petrophile globifera Rye & K.A.Sheph.

Species of shrub endemic to Western Australia

Petrophile globifera is a species of flowering plant in the family Proteaceae and is endemic to southwestern Western Australia. It is a shrub with more or less cylindrical leaves and elliptic to spherical heads of cream-coloured to pale yellow flowers on the ends of branchlets.

== Description ==
Petrophile globifera is a shrub that typically grows to a height of 0.7–1.2 m (2 ft 4 in – 3 ft 11 in) and has hairy, yellow-grey to reddish-brown young branchlets. The leaves are more or less cylindrical, 3–6 mm (0.12–0.24 in) long, about 0.8 mm (0.031 in) wide with a pointed tip. The flowers are arranged on the ends of branchlets in sessile, elliptic to spherical heads 10–18 mm (0.39–0.71 in) in diameter, with narrow egg-shaped, sticky involucral bracts at the base. The flowers are 10–15 mm (0.39–0.59 in) long, cream-coloured to pale yellow and hairy. Flowering occurs from August to October and the fruit is a nut, fused with others in an elliptic or spherical head 9–12 mm (0.35–0.47 in) long and 10–14 mm (0.39–0.55 in) wide.

== Taxonomy ==
Petrophile globifera was first formally described in 2011 by Barbara Lynette Rye and Kelly Anne Shepherd in the journal Nuytsia from material collected by Donald Bruce Foreman in 1984. The specific epithet (globifera) means "sphere-bearing", referring to the flower heads.

== Distribution and habitat ==
This petrophile mainly grows in sand in the area between Morawa, and Pithara.

== Conservation status ==
Petrophile globifera is classified as "Priority Three" by the Government of Western Australia Department of Parks and Wildlife meaning that it is poorly known and known from only a few locations but is not under imminent threat.
