= Petrophile nivea =

Conservation status
- Declared rare (DEC)

Scientific classification
- Kingdom: Plantae
- Clade: Tracheophytes
- Clade: Angiosperms
- Clade: Eudicots
- Order: Proteales
- Family: Proteaceae
- Genus: Petrophile
- Species: P. nivea

Binomial name
- Petrophile nivea Hislop & Rye

Species of shrub endemic to Western Australia

Petrophile nivea is a species of flowering plant in the family Proteaceae and is endemic to southwestern Western Australia. It is a small shrub with crowded cylindrical, sharply-pointed leaves and more or less spherical heads of hairy white or cream-coloured flowers on the ends of branchlets.

== Description ==
Petrophile nivea is a shrub that typically grows to 0.4–0.6 m (1 ft 4 in – 2 ft 0 in) high, 0.3–0.4 m (1 ft 0 in – 1 ft 4 in) wide and has glabrous branchlets and leaves. The leaves are crowded, cylindrical, 10–15 mm (0.39–0.59 in) long, 1–1.5 mm (0.039–0.059 in) wide, straight, curved or S-shaped, and sharply-pointed. The flowers are arranged on the ends of branchlets in sessile, more or less spherical heads 20–25 mm (0.79–0.98 in) in diameter, with a few narrow egg-shaped involucral bracts at the base. The flowers are about 15 mm (0.59 in) long, white or cream-coloured and densely hairy. Flowering occurs from May to August and the fruit is a nut, fused with others in a spherical head 6–8 mm (0.24–0.31 in) long and wide.

== Taxonomy ==
Petrophile nivea was first formally described in 2002 by Michael Clyde Hislop and Barbara Lynette Rye in the journal Nuytsia from material collected by Hislop near Warradarge in 1999. The specific epithet (nivea) means "snow-white", referring to the flowers.

== Distribution and habitat ==
This petrophile is only known from a single locality near Eneabba where it grows with other petrophiles in heathland.

== Conservation status ==
Petrophile nivea classified as "Threatened Flora (Declared Rare Flora — Extant)" by the Department of Environment and Conservation (Western Australia).
