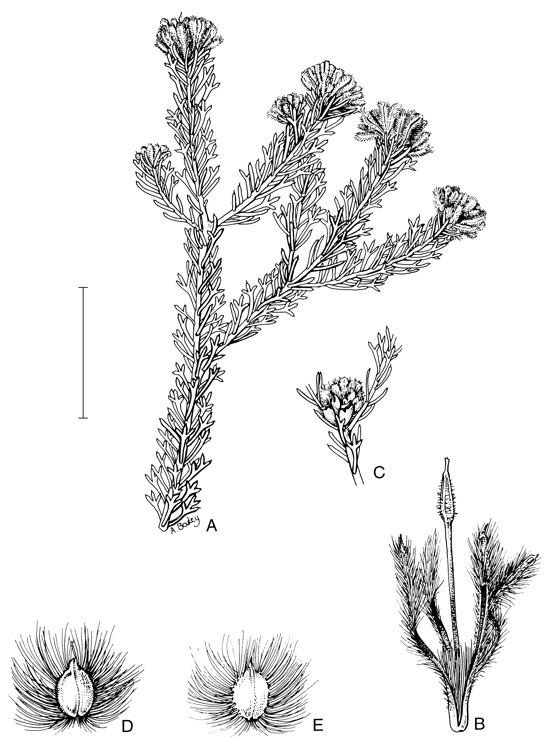
- A=flowering branchlet; B=flower; C=fruiting cone; D, E=upper and lower surfaces of nut

Scientific classification
- Kingdom: Plantae
- Clade: Tracheophytes
- Clade: Angiosperms
- Clade: Eudicots
- Order: Proteales
- Family: Proteaceae
- Genus: Petrophile
- Species: P. misturata

Binomial name
- Petrophile misturata Foreman

= Petrophile misturata =

Species of shrub endemic to Western Australia

Petrophile misturata is a species of flowering plant in the family Proteaceae and is endemic to the south-west of Western Australia. It is a shrub with simple and pinnate, needle-shaped leaves and spherical heads of hairy, dull yellow flowers.

== Description ==
Petrophile misturata is a shrub that typically grows to a height of 0.5–1 m (1 ft 8 in – 3 ft 3 in) and has hairy branchlets and leaves. The leaves are simple and pinnate with up to five needle-shaped, sharply-pointed leaves, 8–16 mm (0.31–0.63 in) long and 0.8–1 mm (0.031–0.039 in) wide. The flowers are arranged on the ends of branchlets in sessile, spherical heads about 10 mm (0.39 in) in diameter, with a few tapering, hairy involucral bracts at the base. The flowers are about 10 mm (0.39 in) long, dull yellow and hairy. Flowering occurs from September to October and the fruit is a nut, fused with others in a spherical head about 12 mm (0.47 in) in diameter.

== Taxonomy ==
Petrophile misturata was first formally described in 1995 by Donald Bruce Foreman in Flora of Australia from material collected by Kenneth Newbey near Quairading in 1964. The specific epithet (misturata) means "mingled" or "mixed", referring to the varying leaf shapes.

== Distribution and habitat ==
This petrophile grows in sand mostly near Quairading, sometimes near Tammin and between Hines Hill and Bruce Rock, in the Avon Wheatbelt biogeographic region of southwestern Western Australia.

== Conservation status ==
Petrophile misturata is classified as "not threatened" by the Western Australian Government Department of Parks and Wildlife.
