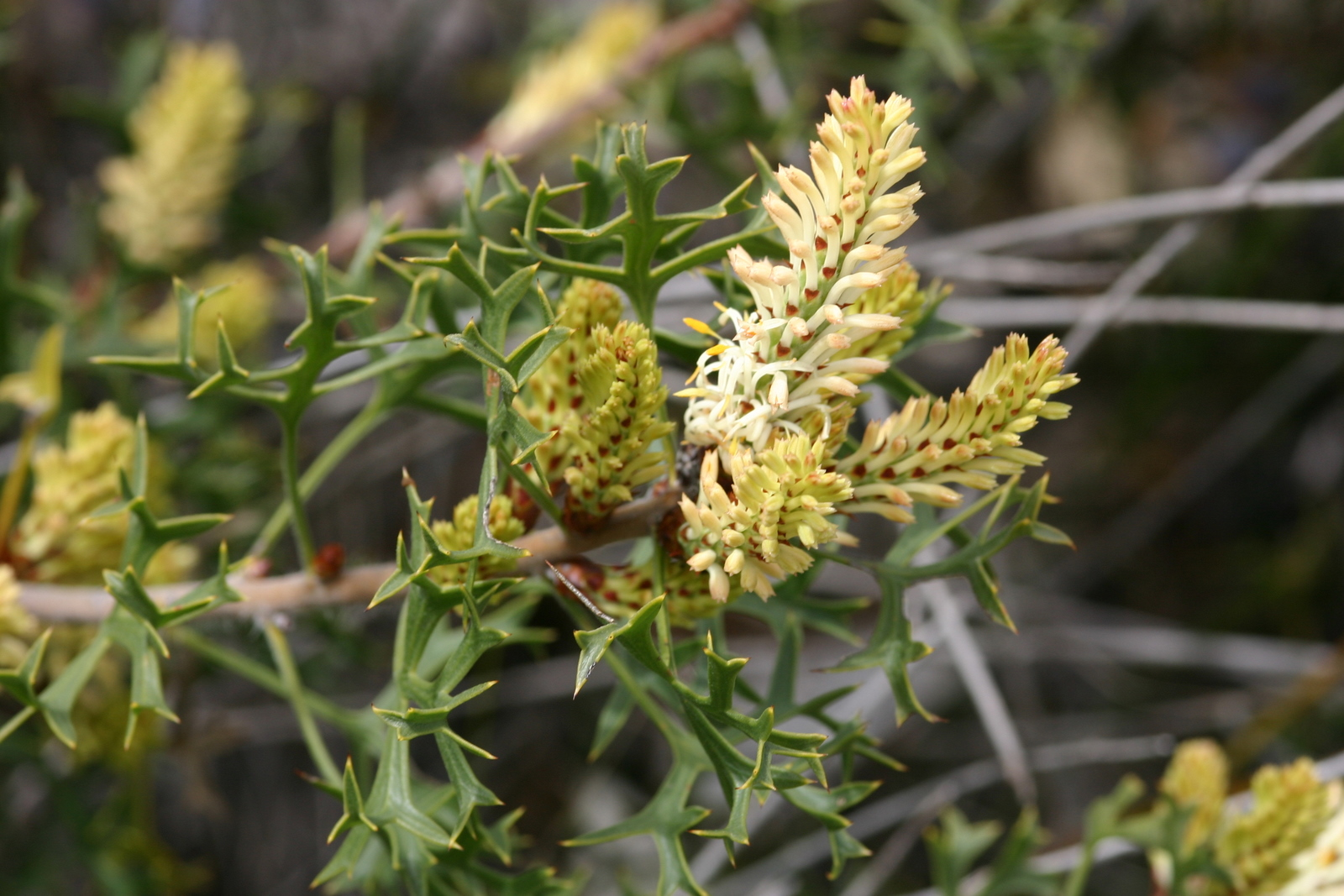
- Petrophile macrostachya

Scientific classification
- Kingdom: Plantae
- Clade: Tracheophytes
- Clade: Angiosperms
- Clade: Eudicots
- Order: Proteales
- Family: Proteaceae
- Subfamily: Proteoideae
- Tribe: Petrophileae
- Genus: Petrophile; R.Br. ex Knight

Type species
- Petrophile pulchella

Species
- See text

Synonyms
- Arthrostygma Steud. nom. inval., pro syn.; Atylus Salisb. nom. rej.; Petrophila R.Br. orth. var.; Petrophylla Cels orth. var.

= Petrophile =

Conebushes

Genus of shrubs endemic to Australia

Petrophile is a genus of evergreen shrubs, in the family Proteaceae. The genus is endemic to Australia. Commonly known as conebushes, they typically have prickly, divided foliage and produce prominently-displayed pink, yellow or cream flowers followed by grey, conical fruits.

== Taxonomy ==
The genus Petrophile was first formally described in 1809 by Joseph Knight in On the cultivation of the plants belonging to the natural order of Proteeae, preempting publication of the same name by Robert Brown in his book On the natural order of plants called Proteaceae.

The name Petrophile is derived from the Greek words petra = rock and philos = seeking or preferring, referring to the rocky habitat in which some species grow.

== Species list ==
The following is a list of Petrophile species and subspecies accepted by the Australian Plant Census as at November 2020:

- Petrophile acicularis R.Br. (W.A.)
- Petrophile aculeata Foreman (W.A.)
- Petrophile anceps R.Br. (W.A.)
- Petrophile antecedens Hislop & Rye (W.A.)
- Petrophile arcuata Foreman (W.A.)
- Petrophile aspera C.A.Gardner ex Foreman (W.A.)
- Petrophile axillaris Meisn. (W.A.)
- Petrophile biloba R.Br. – granite petrophile (W.A.)
- Petrophile biternata Meisn. (W.A.)
- Petrophile brevifolia Lindl. (W.A.)
- Petrophile canescens A.Cunn. ex R.Br. (Qld., N.S.W.)
- Petrophile carduacea Meisn. (W.A.)
- Petrophile chrysantha Meisn. (W.A.)
- Petrophile circinata Kippist ex Meisn. (W.A.)
- Petrophile clavata Hislop & Rye (W.A.)
- Petrophile conifera Meisn. (W.A.)
  - Petrophile conifera Meisn. subsp. conifera
  - Petrophile conifera subsp. divaricata Hislop & K.A.Sheph.
- Petrophile crispata R.Br. (W.A.)
- Petrophile cyathiforma Foreman (W.A.)
- Petrophile divaricata R.Br. (W.A.)
- Petrophile diversifolia R.Br. (W.A.)
- Petrophile drummondii Meisn. (W.A.)
- Petrophile ericifolia R.Br. (W.A.)
  - Petrophile ericifolia R.Br. subsp. ericifolia
  - Petrophile ericifolia subsp. subpubescens (Domin) Foreman
- Petrophile fastigiata R.Br. (W.A.)
- Petrophile filifolia R.Br. (W.A.)
  - Petrophile filifolia R.Br. subsp. filifolia
  - Petrophile filifolia subsp. laxa Rye & Hislop
- Petrophile foremanii Rye & Hislop (W.A.)
- Petrophile glauca Foreman (W.A.)
- Petrophile globifera Rye & K.A.Sheph. (W.A.)
- Petrophile helicophylla Foreman (W.A.)
- Petrophile heterophylla Lindl. (W.A.)
- Petrophile imbricata Foreman (W.A.)
- Petrophile incurvata W.Fitzg. (W.A.)
- Petrophile juncifolia Lindl. (W.A.)
- Petrophile latericola Keighery (W.A.)
- Petrophile linearis R.Br. – pixie mops (W.A.)
- Petrophile longifolia R.Br. (W.A.)
- Petrophile macrostachya R.Br. (W.A.)
- Petrophile media R.Br. (W.A.)
- Petrophile megalostegia F.Muell. (W.A.)
- Petrophile merrallii Foreman (W.A.)
- Petrophile misturata Foreman (W.A.)
- Petrophile multisecta F.Muell. (S.A.)
- Petrophile nivea Hislop & Rye (W.A.)
- Petrophile pauciflora Foreman (W.A.)
- Petrophile pedunculata R.Br. – conesticks (N.S.W.)
- Petrophile phylicoides R.Br. (W.A.)
- Petrophile pilostyla Rye & Hislop (W.A.)
  - Petrophile pilostyla subsp. austrina Rye & Hislop
  - Petrophile pilostyla Rye & Hislop subsp. pilostyla
  - Petrophile pilostyla subsp. syntoma Rye & Hislop
- Petrophile plumosa Meisn. (W.A.)
- Petrophile prostrata Rye & Hislop (W.A.)
- Petrophile pulchella (Schrad. & J.C.Wendl.) R.Br. (Qld., N.S.W.)
- Petrophile recurva Foreman (W.A.)
- Petrophile rigida R.Br. (W.A.)
- Petrophile scabriuscula Meisn. (W.A.)
- Petrophile semifurcata F.Muell. ex Benth. (W.A.)
- Petrophile seminuda Lindl. (W.A.)
- Petrophile septemfida Rye & Sheph. (W.A.)
- Petrophile serruriae R.Br. (W.A.)
- Petrophile sessilis Sieber ex Schult. – prickly conesticks (N.S.W.)
- Petrophile shirleyae F.M.Bailey (Qld.)
- Petrophile shuttleworthiana Meisn. (W.A.)
- Petrophile squamata R.Br. (W.A.)
- Petrophile striata R.Br. (W.A.)
- Petrophile stricta C.A.Gardner ex Foreman (W.A.)
- Petrophile teretifolia R.Br. (W.A.)
- Petrophile trifurcata Foreman (W.A.)
- Petrophile vana Cranfield & T.D.Macfarl. (W.A.)
- Petrophile wonganensis Foreman (W.A.)

== Distribution ==
Species within this genus predominantly occur in Western Australia, but several species are found in other states including South Australia, New South Wales and Queensland.

== Use in horticulture ==
Plants in this genus, particularly those from Western Australia, require a freely draining soil. They tolerate periods of dryness and mild frosts and will grow well in full sun or part shade. They can be propagated from cuttings taken in autumn or from seed; however, the production of new plants by either method can be slow.
