= Petrophile stricta =

Scientific classification
- Kingdom: Plantae
- Clade: Tracheophytes
- Clade: Angiosperms
- Clade: Eudicots
- Order: Proteales
- Family: Proteaceae
- Genus: Petrophile
- Species: P. stricta

Binomial name
- Petrophile stricta C.A.Gardner ex Foreman

Species of shrub endemic to Western Australia

Petrophile stricta is a species of flowering plant in the family Proteaceae and is endemic to the south-west of Western Australia. It is an erect, spreading shrub with needle-shaped, sharply-pointed leaves, and oval heads of hairy, pink to cream-coloured flowers.

== Description ==
Petrophile stricta is an erect, spreading shrub that typically grows to a height of 0.6–1.6 m (2 ft 0 in – 5 ft 3 in) and has glabrous branchlets and leaves. The leaves are needle-shaped, sharply pointed and 45–135 mm (1.8–5.3 in) long. The flowers are arranged at the ends of branchlets in oval heads up to about 20 mm (0.79 in) in diameter on a peduncle 6–12 mm (0.24–0.47 in) long, with deciduous, linear involucral bracts at the base. The flowers are 10–12 mm (0.39–0.47 in) long, pink to cream-coloured and hairy. Flowering occurs from October to December and the fruit is a nut, fused with others in an oval head 20–47 mm (0.79–1.85 in) long.

== Taxonomy ==
Petrophile stricta was first formally described in 1990 by Donald Bruce Foreman in the journal Muelleria from and unpublished description by Charles Gardner. The specific epithet (stricta) means "straight, erect or rigid".

== Distribution and habitat ==
This petrophile grows in sandy shrubland and scrub in sandy-gravelly soils over laterite on sandplains, ridges and low hills in the drier, inland parts in the Avon Wheatbelt, Coolgardie and Mallee biogeographic regions in the south-west of Western Australia.

== Conservation status ==
Petrophile stricta is classified as "not threatened" by the Government of Western Australia Department of Parks and Wildlife.
