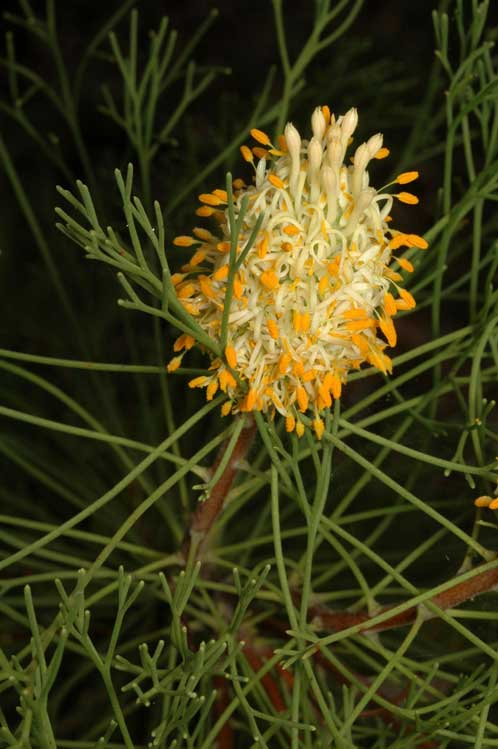
- In the Australian National Botanic Gardens

Scientific classification
- Kingdom: Plantae
- Clade: Tracheophytes
- Clade: Angiosperms
- Clade: Eudicots
- Order: Proteales
- Family: Proteaceae
- Genus: Petrophile
- Species: P. fastigiata

Binomial name
- Petrophile fastigiata R.Br.

Synonyms
- Petrophila fastigiata R.Br. orth. var.; Protea fastigiata (R.Br.) Poir. nom. inval., nom. nud.

= Petrophile fastigiata =

Species of shrub endemic to Western Australia

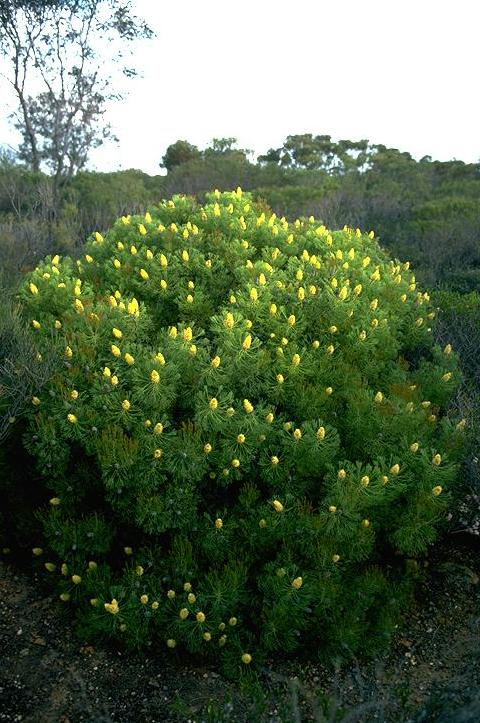
Habit near Ravensthorpe

Petrophile fastigiata is a species of flowering plant in the family Proteaceae and is endemic to southwestern Western Australia. It is a shrub with pinnately-divided leaves with needle-shaped pinnae and sticky, oval heads of glabrous yellow to cream-coloured flowers.

== Description ==
Petrophile fastigiata is a shrub that typically grows to a height of 1–1.5 m (3 ft 3 in – 4 ft 11 in). Its leaves are glabrous, erect, up to 110 mm (4.3 in) long, on a petiole 20–50 mm (0.79–1.97 in) long, two or three times pinnately-divided, with mostly needle-shaped pinnae. The flowers are arranged in sessile, sticky, oval heads with many overlapping, triangular involucral bracts at the base. The flowers are about 10 mm (0.39 in) long, glabrous and yellow to cream-coloured. Flowering occurs from September to November and the fruit is a nut, fused with others in an oval head up to 20–40 mm (0.79–1.57 in) long.

== Taxonomy ==
Petrophile fastigiata was first formally described in 1810 by Robert Brown in the Transactions of the Linnean Society of London. The specific epithet (fastigiata) refers to the fastigiate, more or less erect leaves.

== Distribution and habitat ==
This petrophile grows in scrub and low heath between Ravensthorpe and Mount Burdett near Esperance, in the Esperance Plains and Mallee biogeographical regions of southwestern Western Australia.

== Conservation status ==
Petrophile fastigiata is classified as "not threatened" by the Western Australian Government Department of Parks and Wildlife.
