= Petrophile foremanii =

Scientific classification
- Kingdom: Plantae
- Clade: Tracheophytes
- Clade: Angiosperms
- Clade: Eudicots
- Order: Proteales
- Family: Proteaceae
- Genus: Petrophile
- Species: P. foremanii

Binomial name
- Petrophile foremanii Rye & Hislop

Species of shrub endemic to Western Australia

Petrophile foremanii is a species of flowering plant in the family Proteaceae and is endemic to the south-west of Western Australia. It is a shrub with more or less cylindrical leaves and elliptic to spherical heads of hairy, creamy yellow flowers on the ends of branchlets.

== Description ==
Petrophile foremanii is a shrub that typically grows to a height of 0.6–2 m (2 ft 0 in – 6 ft 7 in) and has hairy, yellow-grey to brown young branchlets. The leaves are more or less cylindrical, 8–11 mm (0.31–0.43 in) long, 0.6–0.8 mm (0.024–0.031 in) wide with a pointed tip, and hairy at first but become glabrous with age. The flowers are arranged on the ends of branchlets in sessile, elliptic to spherical heads 10–20 mm (0.39–0.79 in) in diameter, with narrow egg-shaped or tapering, densely hairy involucral bracts at the base. The flowers are 10–15 mm (0.39–0.59 in) long, creamy yellow and densely hairy. Flowering occurs from May to October and the fruit is a nut, fused with others in an elliptic or spherical head 8–14 mm (0.31–0.55 in) long and 8–12 mm (0.31–0.47 in) wide.

== Taxonomy ==
Petrophile foremanii was first formally described in 2011 by Barbara Lynette Rye and Michael Clyde Hislop in the journal Nuytsia from material collected by W.E. Blackall near Coorow in 1932. The specific epithet (foremanii) honours Donald Bruce Foreman.

== Distribution and habitat ==
This petrophile mainly grows in Banksia and Acacia, mostly within Kalbarri National Park.

== Conservation status ==
Petrophile foremanii is classified as "not threatened" by the Western Australian Government Department of Parks and Wildlife.
