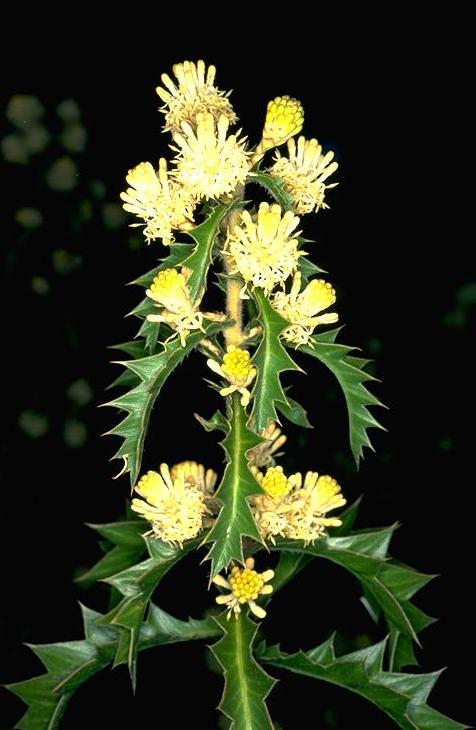

Conservation status
- Priority Two — Poorly Known Taxa (DEC)

Scientific classification
- Kingdom: Plantae
- Clade: Embryophytes
- Clade: Tracheophytes
- Clade: Spermatophytes
- Clade: Angiosperms
- Clade: Eudicots
- Order: Proteales
- Family: Proteaceae
- Genus: Petrophile
- Species: P. carduacea

Binomial name
- Petrophile carduacea Meisn.

Synonyms
- Petrophila carduacea Meisn. orth. var.

= Petrophile carduacea =

Species of shrub endemic to Western Australia

Petrophile carduacea is a species of flowering plant in the family Proteaceae and is endemic to the south-west of Western Australia. It is a shrub with deeply toothed leaves, and more or less spherical heads of hairy yellow flowers.

== Description ==
Petrophile carduacea is a shrub that typically grows to a height of 1–2 m (3 ft 3 in – 6 ft 7 in) and has hairy young branchlets. The leaves are 50–120 mm (2.0–4.7 in) long, 10–50 mm (0.39–1.97 in) wide and deeply toothed, the teeth broadly triangular and sharply-pointed. The flowers are arranged in leaf axils in more or less spherical heads about 10 mm (0.39 in) in diameter, with a few triangular involucral bracts at the base. The flowers are about 8 mm (0.31 in) long, yellow and hairy. Flowering occurs from September to October and the fruit is a nut, fused with others in an oblong head 20–35 mm (0.79–1.38 in) long on a peduncle up to 10 mm (0.39 in) long.

== Taxonomy ==
Petrophile carduacea was first formally described in 1856 by Carl Meissner in de Candolle's Prodromus Systematis Naturalis Regni Vegetabilis from material collected by James Drummond. The specific epithet (carduacea) means "thistle-like".

== Distribution and habitat ==
This petrophile grows in scrub and heath in and near the Stirling Range in the Esperance Plains and Jarrah Forest biogeographic regions of southwestern Western Australia.

== Conservation status ==
Petrophile carduacea is classified as "Priority Two" by the Western Australian Government Department of Parks and Wildlife meaning that it is poorly known and from only one or a few locations.
