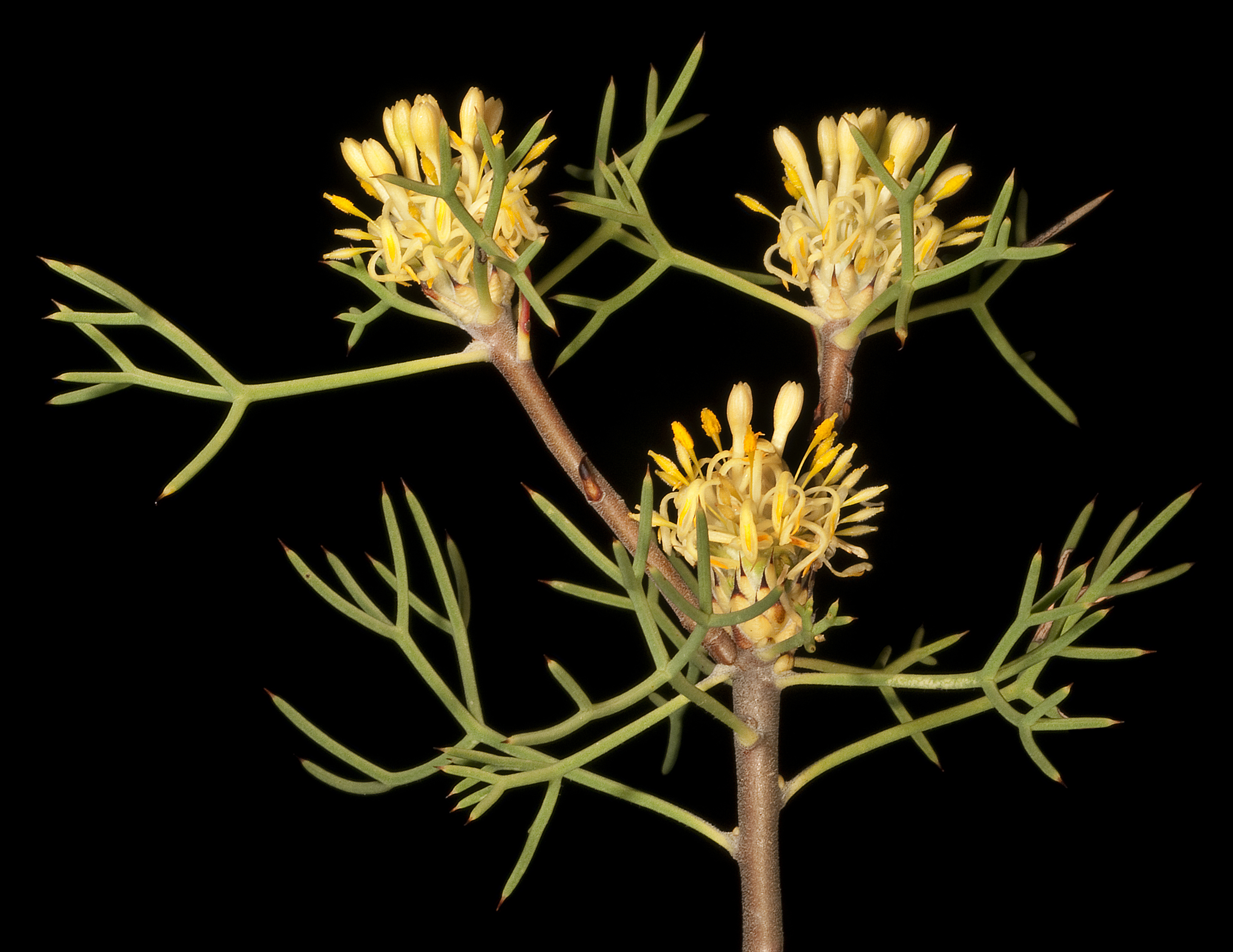
- Petrophile seminuda

Scientific classification
- Kingdom: Plantae
- Clade: Tracheophytes
- Clade: Angiosperms
- Clade: Eudicots
- Order: Proteales
- Family: Proteaceae
- Genus: Petrophile
- Species: P. seminuda

Binomial name
- Petrophile seminuda Lindl.

= Petrophile seminuda =

Species of shrub endemic to Western Australia

Petrophile seminuda is a species of flowering plant in the family Proteaceae and is endemic to southwestern Western Australia. It is a shrub with needle-shaped, sharply-pointed leaves usually divided into two or three lobes, and heads of yellow flowers.

== Description ==
Petrophile seminuda is a shrub that typically grows to a height of 0.3–1.5 m (1 ft 0 in – 4 ft 11 in) and usually has glabrous branchlets and leaves. The leaves are needle-shaped, sharply-pointed, 30–128 mm (1.2–5.0 in) long, usually divided into two or three lobes 5–50 mm (0.20–1.97 in) long. The flowers are arranged on the ends of branchlets in spherical or oval heads 20–40 mm (0.79–1.57 in) long with many egg-shaped to lance-shaped involucral bracts at the base. The flowers are 8–12 mm (0.31–0.47 in) long, yellow and glabrous. Flowering occurs from September to November and the fruit is a nut, fused with others in an oval or almost spherical head 10–40 mm (0.39–1.57 in) long.

== Taxonomy ==
Petrophile seminuda was first formally described in 1840 by John Lindley in A Sketch of the Vegetation of the Swan River Colony. The specific epithet (seminuda) means "half-bare", referring to the bracts.

== Distribution and habitat ==
This petrophile is mostly found in woodland, shrubland and heath on sandplains and ridges, growing in sandy-loamy soils over laterite. It is widely distributed between Geraldton, the Fitzgerald River National Park and the Darling Range to near Southern Cross.

== Conservation status ==
Petrophile seminuda is classified as "not threatened" by the Government of Western Australia Department of Parks and Wildlife.
