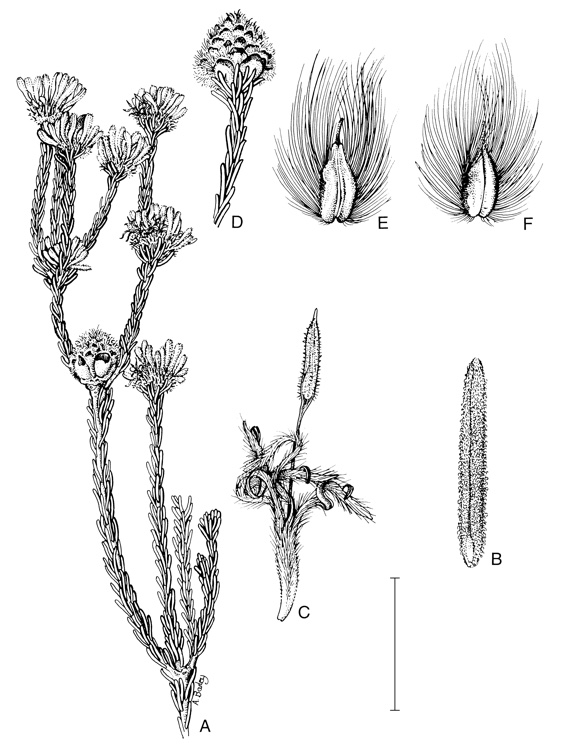
- A=flowering and fruiting branchlet; B=leaf; C=flower; D=fruiting branchlet; E, F=upper and lower surface of nut

Scientific classification
- Kingdom: Plantae
- Clade: Tracheophytes
- Clade: Angiosperms
- Clade: Eudicots
- Order: Proteales
- Family: Proteaceae
- Genus: Petrophile
- Species: P. wonganensis

Binomial name
- Petrophile wonganensis Foreman

= Petrophile wonganensis =

Species of shrub endemic to Western Australia

Petrophile wonganensis is a species of flowering plant in the family Proteaceae and is endemic to the south-west of Western Australia. It is a dense shrub with blunt, needle-shaped leaves, and more or less spherical heads of hairy, yellow flowers.

== Description ==
Petrophile wonganensis is a dense shrub that typically grows to a height of 0.5–1.5 m (1 ft 8 in – 4 ft 11 in) and has hairy young branchlets and leaves that become glabrous as they age. The leaves are blunt, needle-shaped, 5–9 mm (0.20–0.35 in) long. The flowers are arranged at the ends of branchlets in sessile, more or less spherical heads up to about 15 mm (0.59 in) in diameter, with egg-shaped or elliptic involucral bracts at the base. The flowers are about 14–15 mm (0.55–0.59 in) long, yellow and hairy. Flowering occurs from August to January and the fruit is a nut, fused with others in a more or less spherical head 15–20 mm (0.59–0.79 in) in diameter.

== Taxonomy ==
Petrophile wonganensis was first formally described in 1995 by Donald Bruce Foreman in Flora of Australia from material collected by James Henderson Ross near Wongan Hills in 1984. The specific epithet (wonganensis) refers to the type location.

== Distribution and habitat ==
This petrophile mainly occurs near Wongan Hills and towards Cowcowing, in the Avon Wheatbelt biogeographic region. It grows in heath and shrubland in sand or sandy loam.

== Conservation status ==
This petrophile is classified as "not threatened" by the Western Australian Government Department of Parks and Wildlife.
