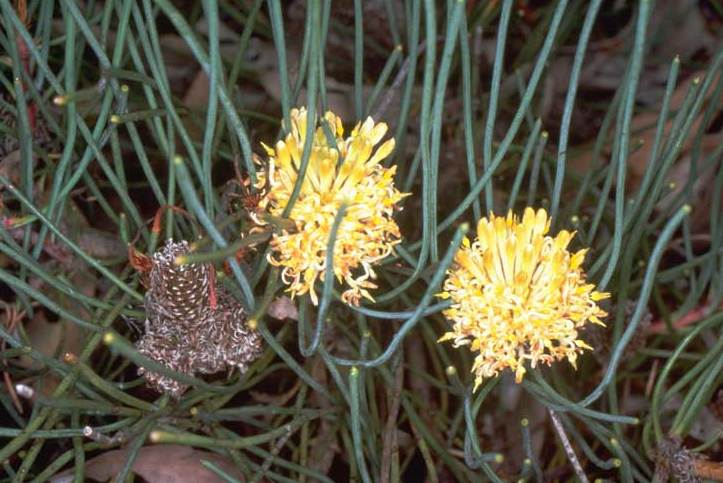
- In the Australian National Botanic Gardens

Scientific classification
- Kingdom: Plantae
- Clade: Tracheophytes
- Clade: Angiosperms
- Clade: Eudicots
- Order: Proteales
- Family: Proteaceae
- Genus: Petrophile
- Species: P. media

Binomial name
- Petrophile media R.Br.

Synonyms
- Petrophila media R.Br. orth. var.; Petrophile media R.Br. var. media; Petrophile media var. typica Domin nom. inval.

= Petrophile media =

Species of shrub endemic to Western Australia

Petrophile media is a species of flowering plant in the family Proteaceae and is endemic to southwestern Western Australia. It is a low, spreading to erect shrub with needle-shaped leaves, and oval heads of hairy cream-coloured to yellow flowers.

== Description ==
Petrophile media is a low spreading to erect shrub that typically grows to a height of 0.5–0.8 m (1 ft 8 in – 2 ft 7 in) and has glabrous branchlets and leaves. The leaves are needle-shaped, up to 300 mm (12 in) long, sometimes with a short, curved tip. The flowers are arranged on the ends of branchlets in sessile, oval heads about 25 mm (0.98 in) long, with many tapering, linear to lance-shaped involucral bracts at the base. The flowers are about 15–20 mm (0.59–0.79 in) long, cream-coloured to yellow and hairy. Flowering occurs from August to February and the fruit is a nut, fused with others, usually in an oval head 10–25 mm (0.39–0.98 in) long.

== Taxonomy ==
Petrophile media was first formally described in 1830 by Robert Brown in the Supplementum to his Prodromus Florae Novae Hollandiae et Insulae Van Diemen from material collected by William Baxter near King Georges Sound in 1829. The specific epithet (media) means "middle", "common" or "intermediate between other species".

== Distribution and habitat ==
Petrophile media grows in a variety of habitats on the Darling Range south of Perth and on the coastal plain to the Stirling Range and eastwards to near Ravensthorpe in the Avon Wheatbelt, Esperance Plains, Jarrah Forest and Mallee biogeographic regions.

== Conservation status ==
This petrophile is classified as "not threatened" by the Western Australian Government Department of Parks and Wildlife.
