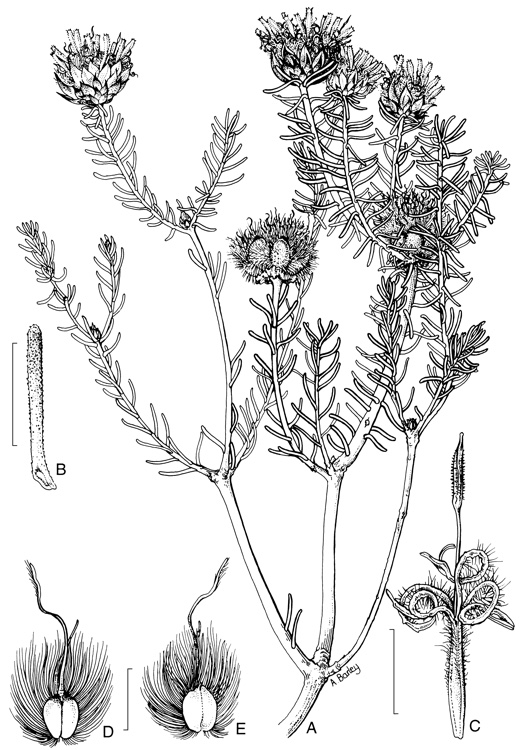
- A=flowering and fruiting branchlet; B=leaf; C=flower; D, E=upper and lower surfaces of nut

Scientific classification
- Kingdom: Plantae
- Clade: Tracheophytes
- Clade: Angiosperms
- Clade: Eudicots
- Order: Proteales
- Family: Proteaceae
- Genus: Petrophile
- Species: P. merrallii

Binomial name
- Petrophile merrallii Foreman

= Petrophile merrallii =

Species of shrub endemic to Western Australia

Petrophile merrallii is a species of flowering plant in the family Proteaceae and is endemic to southwestern Western Australia. It is an erect shrub with spreading, needle-shaped leaves and oval to spherical heads of hairy yellow flowers.

== Description ==
Petrophile merrallii is a shrub that typically grows to a height of 0.5–1.5 m (1 ft 8 in – 4 ft 11 in) and has hairy young branchlets and leaves that become glabrous with age. The leaves are spreading needle-shaped, 4–14 mm (0.16–0.55 in) long and rough to the touch. The flowers are arranged on the ends of branchlets in sessile, oval to spherical heads up to about 16 mm (0.63 in) in diameter, with many overlapping egg-shaped involucral bracts at the base. The flowers are about 15 mm (0.59 in) long, yellow and hairy. Flowering occurs from August to October and the fruit is a nut, fused with others in an oval to spherical head up to 20 mm (0.79 in) in diameter.

== Taxonomy ==
Petrophile merrallii was first formally described in 1995 by Donald Bruce Foreman in Flora of Australia from material collected near Southern Cross in 1968. The specific epithet (merrallii) honours Edwin Merrall, a miner who collected plant specimens in Victoria 1887–1888.

== Distribution and habitat ==
This petrophile grows in heath and mallee on sandy-gravelly soils over laterite between Southern Cross, Muntadgin, Pingrup and Lake Grace in the Avon Wheatbelt, Coolgardie and Mallee biogeographic regions of southwestern Western Australia.

== Conservation status ==
Petrophile merrallii is classified as "not threatened" by the Western Australian Government Department of Parks and Wildlife.
