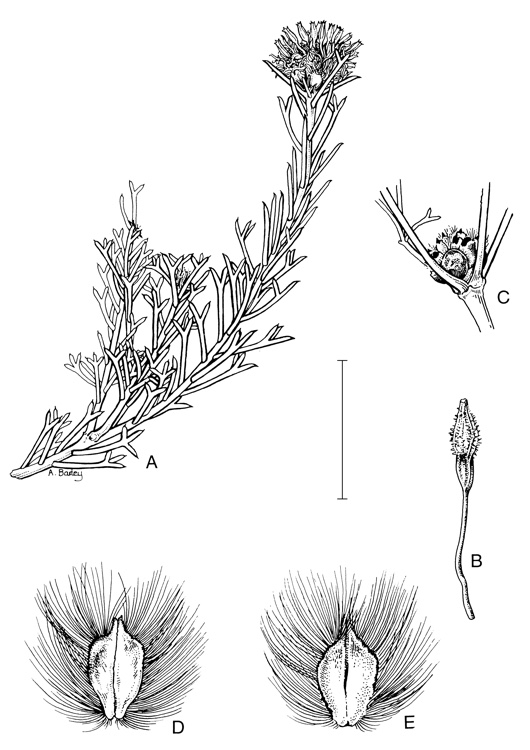
- A=flowering branchlet; B=style; C=fruiting branchlet; D, E=upper and lower surfaces of nut

Conservation status
- Priority Two — Poorly Known Taxa (DEC)

Scientific classification
- Kingdom: Plantae
- Clade: Tracheophytes
- Clade: Angiosperms
- Clade: Eudicots
- Order: Proteales
- Family: Proteaceae
- Genus: Petrophile
- Species: P. trifurcata

Binomial name
- Petrophile trifurcata Foreman

= Petrophile trifurcata =

Species of shrub endemic to Western Australia

Petrophile trifurcata is a species of flowering plant in the family Proteaceae and is endemic to the south-west of Western Australia. It is a shrub with three-lobed, needle-shaped, sharply-pointed leaves, and spherical heads of hairy, yellow flowers.

== Description ==
Petrophile trifurcata is a shrub that typically grows to a height of 35–65 cm (14–26 in) and has hairy young branchlets that become glabrous as they age. The leaves are 10–16 mm (0.39–0.63 in) long and needle-shaped, mostly with three sharply-pointed lobes up to 6 mm (0.24 in) long. The flowers are arranged at the ends of branchlets in sessile, spherical heads 8–10 mm (0.31–0.39 in) in diameter, with egg-shaped involucral bracts at the base. The flowers are about 10 mm (0.39 in) long, yellow and hairy. Flowering has been observed in September and the fruit is a nut, fused with others in a spherical head about 12 mm (0.47 in) in diameter.

== Taxonomy ==
Petrophile trifurcata was first formally described in 1995 by Donald Bruce Foreman in Flora of Australia from material collected near Wongan Hills in 1983. The specific epithet (trifurcata) means "three-forked", referring to the three-pronged leaves.

== Distribution and habitat ==
This petrophile is only known from a few locations near Wongan Hills and between Watheroo and Coorow in the Avon Wheatbelt, Geraldton Sandplains biogeographic regions, growing in sandy soil with Actinostrobus arenarius.

== Conservation status ==
This petrophile is classified as "Priority Two" by the Western Australian Government Department of Parks and Wildlife meaning that it is poorly known and from only one or a few locations.
