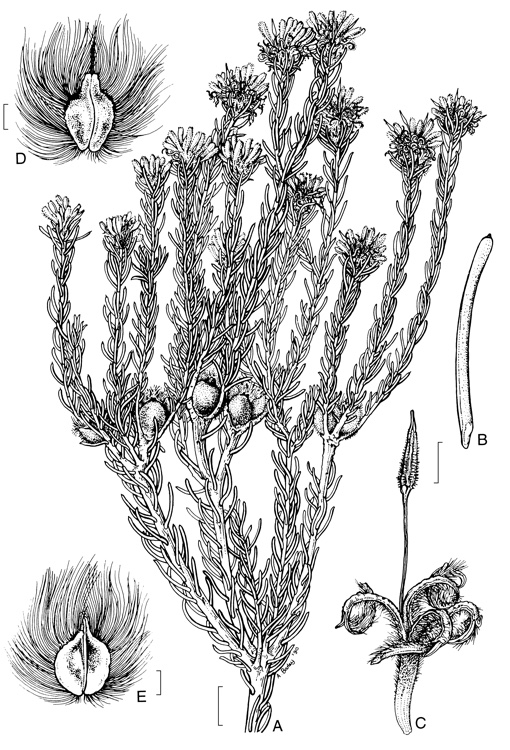

Scientific classification
- Kingdom: Plantae
- Clade: Tracheophytes
- Clade: Angiosperms
- Clade: Eudicots
- Order: Proteales
- Family: Proteaceae
- Genus: Petrophile
- Species: P. arcuata

Binomial name
- Petrophile arcuata Foreman

= Petrophile arcuata =

Species of shrub endemic to Western Australia

Petrophile arcuata is a species of flowering plant in the family Proteaceae and is endemic to the south-west of Western Australia. It is a spreading shrub with cylindrical leaves and oval to spherical heads of hairy yellowish flowers.

== Description ==
Petrophile arcuata is a shrub that typically grows to a height of 0.7–1.5 m (2 ft 4 in – 4 ft 11 in) and has more or less glabrous branchlets. The leaves are cylindrical, 5–15 mm (0.20–0.59 in) long and 0.7–1.0 mm (0.028–0.039 in) wide. The flowers are arranged in sessile, oval to spherical heads about 12 mm (0.47 in) in diameter, with a few glabrous egg-shaped involucral bracts at the base. The flowers are about 12 mm (0.47 in) long, creamy yellow to yellow and hairy. Flowering occurs from September to October and the fruit is a nut, fused with others in a more or less spherical head 10–15 mm (0.39–0.59 in) in diameter.

== Taxonomy ==
Petrophile arcuata was first formally described in 1995 by Donald Bruce Foreman in Flora of Australia. The specific epithet (arcuata) means "curved like a bow", referring to leaves.

== Distribution and habitat ==
This petrophile grows in scrub along the Great Eastern Highway between Southern Cross and Coolgardie, extending south to Peak Charles in the Avon Wheatbelt, Coolgardie and Mallee biogeographic regions of southwestern Western Australia.

== Conservation status ==
Petrophile arcuata is classified as "not threatened" by the Western Australian Government Department of Parks and Wildlife.
