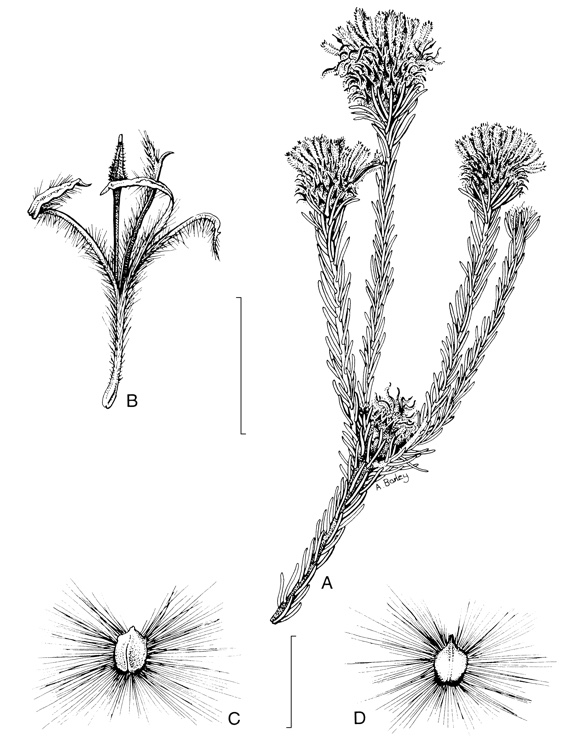
- A=flowering and fruiting branchlet; B=flower; C=upper and lower surfaces of nut

Scientific classification
- Kingdom: Plantae
- Clade: Tracheophytes
- Clade: Angiosperms
- Clade: Eudicots
- Order: Proteales
- Family: Proteaceae
- Genus: Petrophile
- Species: P. imbricata

Binomial name
- Petrophile imbricata Foreman

= Petrophile imbricata =

Species of shrub endemic to Western Australia

Petrophile imbricata is a species of flowering plant in the family Proteaceae and is endemic to southwestern Western Australia. It is a shrub with overlapping, needle-like leaves and oval heads of hairy cream-coloured flowers.

== Description ==
Petrophile imbricata is a shrub that typically grows to a height of 1–2 m (3 ft 3 in – 6 ft 7 in) and has hairy young branchlets. The leaves are needle-shaped, up to about 15 mm (0.59 in) long and overlap each other. The flowers are arranged on the ends of branchlets in sessile, oval heads up to about 18 mm (0.71 in) in diameter, with many overlapping narrow egg-shaped involucral bracts at the base. The flowers are up to about 20 mm (0.79 in) long, cream-coloured and hairy. Flowering occurs from August to September and the fruit is a nut, fused with others in an oval to slightly cup-shaped head up to about 18 mm (0.71 in) in diameter.

== Taxonomy ==
Petrophile imbricata was first formally described in 1995 by Donald Bruce Foreman in Flora of Australia from material he collected in Boyagin Nature Reserve in 1985. The specific epithet (imbricata) refers to the overlapping leaves and involucral bracts.

== Distribution and habitat ==
This petrophile grows in dense scrub, woodland and forest mostly near the Dryandra Woodland, Boddington, Boyagin Nature Reserve and Katanning in the Avon Wheatbelt and Jarrah Forest biogeographic regions of southwestern Western Australia.

== Conservation status ==
Petrophile imbricata is classified as "not threatened" by the Western Australian Government Department of Parks and Wildlife.
