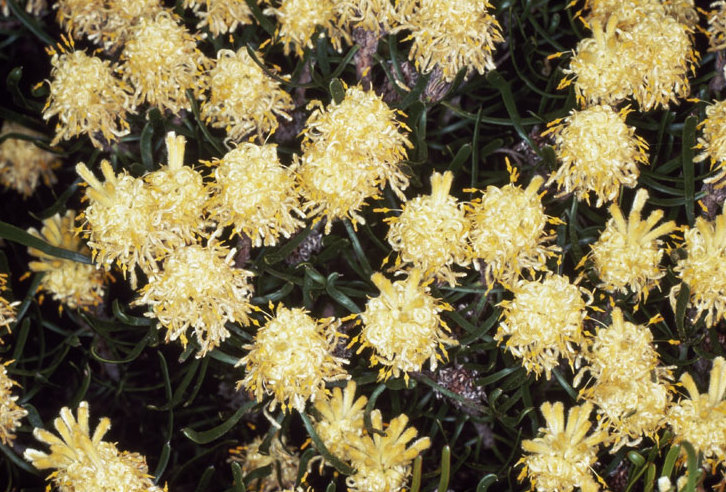

Scientific classification
- Kingdom: Plantae
- Clade: Tracheophytes
- Clade: Angiosperms
- Clade: Eudicots
- Order: Proteales
- Family: Proteaceae
- Genus: Petrophile
- Species: P. anceps

Binomial name
- Petrophile anceps R.Br.

Synonyms
- Petrophila anceps R.Br. orth. var.; Petrophila linearis var. anceps Benth. orth. var.; Petrophile linearis var. anceps (R.Br.) Benth.

= Petrophile anceps =

Species of shrub endemic to Western Australia

Petrophile anceps is a species of flowering plant in the family Proteaceae and is endemic to a restricted part of the south-west of Western Australia. It is a shrub with sharply-pointed, linear leaves and oval heads of hairy yellow flowers.

== Description ==
Petrophile acicularis is a shrub that typically grows to a height of 0.5–1 m (1 ft 8 in – 3 ft 3 in) and has glabrous branchlets and leaves. The leaves are linear, 60–110 mm (2.4–4.3 in) long and 2–3 mm (0.079–0.118 in) wide with a sharply-pointed tip. The flowers are arranged in sessile, oval heads about 15 mm (0.59 in) long, sometimes in clusters, with many pointed involucral bracts at the base. The flowers are about 15 mm (0.59 in) long, yellow and hairy. Flowering occurs from September to October and the fruit is a nut, fused with others in a conical head about 25 mm (0.98 in) long.

== Taxonomy ==
Petrophile acicularis was first formally described in 1830 by Robert Brown in the Supplementum to his Prodromus Florae Novae Hollandiae et Insulae Van Diemen from material collected by William Baxter at King George's Sound. The specific epithet (anceps) means "double", referring to the panicle.

== Distribution and habitat ==
This petrophile is restricted to the Stirling Range where it grows in heath and scrub.

== Conservation status ==
Petrophile acicularis is classified as "not threatened" by the Western Australian Government Department of Parks and Wildlife.
