= Petrophile chrysantha =

Scientific classification
- Kingdom: Plantae
- Clade: Tracheophytes
- Clade: Angiosperms
- Clade: Eudicots
- Order: Proteales
- Family: Proteaceae
- Genus: Petrophile
- Species: P. chrysantha

Binomial name
- Petrophile chrysantha Meisn.

Synonyms
- Petrophila chrysantha Meisn. orth. var.

Species of shrub endemic to Western Australia

Petrophile chrysantha is a species of flowering plant in the family Proteaceae and is endemic to the south-west of Western Australia. It is a small shrub with crowded, sharply-pointed, pinnately-divided leaves, and oval heads of hairy, cream-coloured to dark yellow flowers.

== Description ==
Petrophile chrysantha is a shrub that typically grows to a height of 0.5–1 m (1 ft 8 in – 3 ft 3 in) and has hairy young branchlets. The leaves are crowded along the branchlets, 5–20 mm (0.20–0.79 in) long on a petiole 1–4 mm (0.039–0.157 in) long. They are needle-like, pinnately divided to the midrib with sharply-pointed pinnae up to 10 mm (0.39 in) long. The flowers are arranged on the ends of branchlets in sessile, oval heads about 10 mm (0.39 in) long, with broad, overlapping involucral bracts at the base. The flowers are up to 14 mm (0.55 in) long, cream-coloured to dark yellow and densely hairy. Flowering occurs from June to October and the fruit is a nut, fused with others in a spherical to oval head about 10 mm (0.39 in) in diameter.

== Taxonomy ==
Petrophile chrysantha was first formally described in 1855 by Carl Meissner in Hooker's Journal of Botany and Kew Garden Miscellany from material collected by James Drummond. The specific epithet (chrysantha) means "golden-flowered".

== Distribution and habitat ==
This petrophile grows in shrubland and woodland between Regans Ford, Eneabba and Marchagee in the Geraldton Sandplains and Swan Coastal Plain biogeographic regions of southwestern Western Australia.

== Conservation status ==
Petrophile chrysantha is classified as "not threatened" by the Western Australian Government Department of Parks and Wildlife.
