= Petrophile multisecta =

Kangaroo Island conesticks

Scientific classification
- Kingdom: Plantae
- Clade: Tracheophytes
- Clade: Angiosperms
- Clade: Eudicots
- Order: Proteales
- Family: Proteaceae
- Genus: Petrophile
- Species: P. multisecta

Binomial name
- Petrophile multisecta F.Muell.

Synonyms
- Petrophila multisecta F.Muell. orth. var.

Species of shrub endemic to Western Australia

Petrophile multisecta, commonly known as Kangaroo Island conesticks, is a species of flowering plant in the family Proteaceae and is endemic to Kangaroo Island in South Australia. It is a prickly shrub with rigid, much-divided leaves with sharply pointed tips, oval to spherical heads of hairy cream-coloured flowers and oval fruit.

== Description ==
Petrophile multisecta is a shrub that typically grows to a height of about 0.6 m (2 ft 0 in) and has hairy grey branchlets. The leaves are 40–80 mm (1.6–3.1 in) long and much divided, the first divisions with three branches and the later branches with two. The flowers are arranged in sessile heads 20–25 mm (0.79–0.98 in) long at the base of branchlets, each flower 8–15 mm (0.31–0.59 in) long, cream-coloured and hairy. Flowering mainly occurs from October to February and the fruit is a nut, fused with others in an oval head 15–40 mm (0.59–1.57 in) long.

== Taxonomy ==
Petrophile multisecta was first formally described in 1868 by Ferdinand von Mueller in Fragmenta Phytographiae Australiae. The specific epithet (multisecta) means "much-divided, referring to the leaves.

== Distribution and habitat ==
Kangaroo Island conesticks grows in lateritic or calcareous sand and is common on Kangaroo Island where it is endemic.
