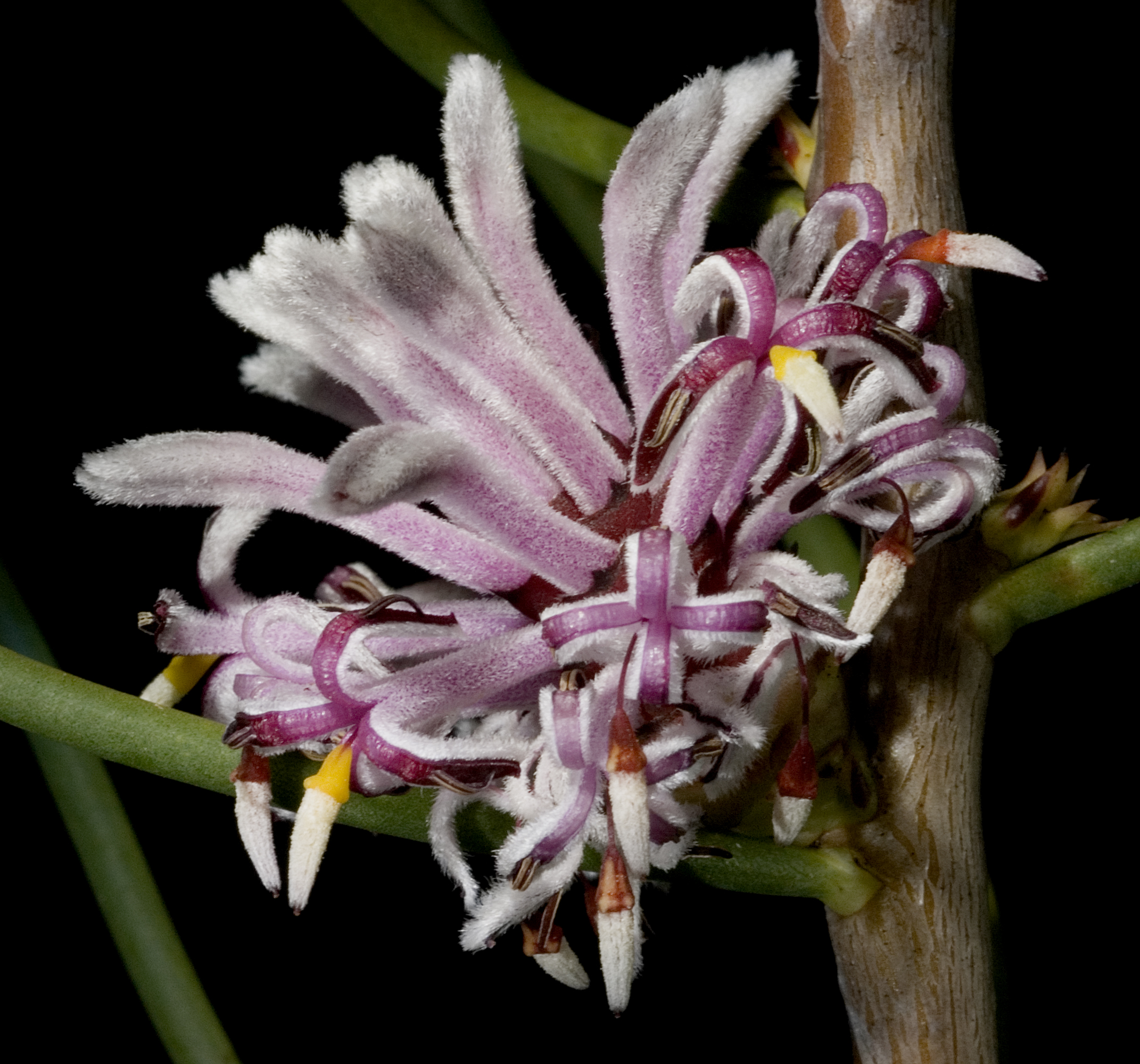

Scientific classification
- Kingdom: Plantae
- Clade: Tracheophytes
- Clade: Angiosperms
- Clade: Eudicots
- Order: Proteales
- Family: Proteaceae
- Genus: Petrophile
- Species: P. teretifolia

Binomial name
- Petrophile teretifolia R.Br.

Synonyms
- Petrophila crassifolia R.Br. orth. var.; Petrophile crassifolia R.Br.; Protea teretifolia (R.Br.) Poir.

= Petrophile teretifolia =

Species of shrub endemic to Western Australia

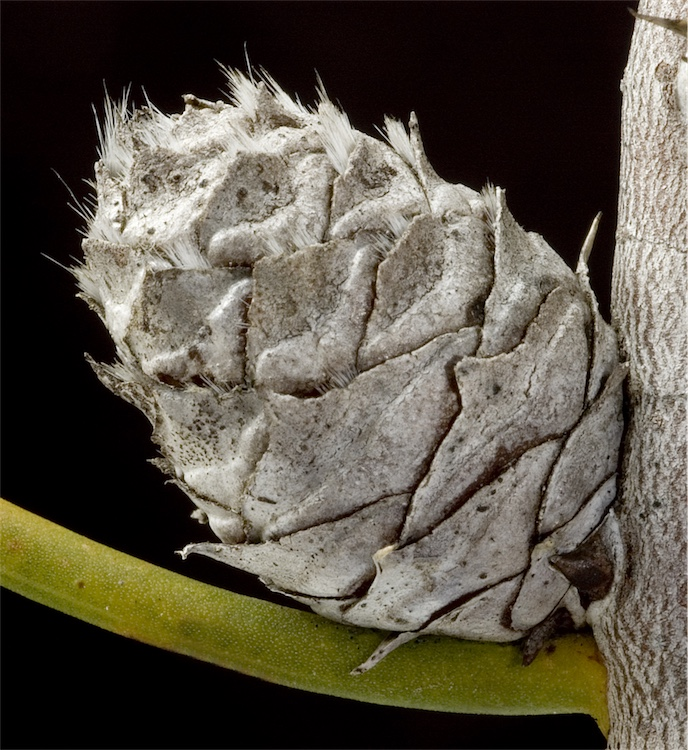
Fruit

Petrophile teretifolia is a species of flowering plant in the family Proteaceae and is endemic to the south-west of Western Australia. It is a shrub with needle-shaped but blunt-pointed leaves, and oval to more or less spherical heads of hairy pink to mauve flowers.

== Description ==
Petrophile teretifolia is an erect or spreading shrub that typically grows to a height of 0.1–2 m (3.9 in – 6 ft 6.7 in) and has glabrous branchlets and leaves. The leaves are needle-shaped but with blunt tips, 40–200 mm (1.6–7.9 in) long. The flowers are arranged in leaf axils or on the ends of branches in oval to more or less spherical heads about 15 mm (0.59 in) long, with a few involucral bracts at the base. The heads are sessile or on a peduncle 2–3 mm (0.079–0.118 in) long. The flowers are 17–25 mm (0.67–0.98 in) long, pink to mauve and hairy. Flowering occurs from September to January and the fruit is a nut, fused with others in a spherical, oval or elliptic head 15–25 mm (0.59–0.98 in) long.

== Taxonomy ==
Petrophile teretifolia was first formally described in 1810 by Robert Brown in Transactions of the Linnean Society of London. The specific epithet (teretifolia) means "terete-leaved".

== Distribution and habitat ==
Petrophile teretifolia grows on granite outcrops, in heath, scub and sandplain between the Stirling Range and Israelite Bay in the Esperance Plains, Jarrah Forest and Mallee biogeographic regions of south-western Western Australia.

== Conservation status ==
This petrophile is classified as "not threatened" by the Western Australian Government Department of Parks and Wildlife.
