= Petrophile septemfida =

Conservation status
- Priority Three — Poorly Known Taxa (DEC)

Scientific classification
- Kingdom: Plantae
- Clade: Tracheophytes
- Clade: Angiosperms
- Clade: Eudicots
- Order: Proteales
- Family: Proteaceae
- Genus: Petrophile
- Species: P. septemfida

Binomial name
- Petrophile septemfida Rye & K.A.Sheph.

Species of shrub endemic to Western Australia

Petrophile septemfida is a species of flowering plant in the family Proteaceae and is endemic to southwestern Western Australia. It is a shrub with leaves usually with seven lobes divided almost to the midrib, and spherical heads of cream-coloured to pale yellow flowers on the ends of branchlets.

== Description ==
Petrophile septemfida is a shrub that typically grows to a height of 0.6–1.2 m (2 ft 0 in – 3 ft 11 in) and has densely hairy young branchlets. The leaves are more or less erect, 4–13 mm (0.16–0.51 in) long, divided to the midrib usually with seven cylindrical lobes 1.2–8.5 mm (0.047–0.335 in) in diameter with a sharply-pointed tip. The flowers are arranged on the ends of branchlets in sessile, spherical heads 9–16 mm (0.35–0.63 in) in diameter, with narrow egg-shaped involucral bracts at the base. The flowers are 10.5–13.5 mm (0.41–0.53 in) long, cream-coloured to pale yellow and hairy. Flowering occurs from late June to early October and the fruit is a nut, fused with others in a more or less spherical head 5–10 mm (0.20–0.39 in) in diameter.

== Taxonomy ==
Petrophile septemfida was first formally described in 2011 by Barbara Lynette Rye and Kelly Anne Shepherd in the journal Nuytsia from material collected near Badgingarra by Michael Clyde Hislop in 2008. The specific epithet (septemfida) means "seven-cleft", referring to the leaves.

== Distribution and habitat ==
This petrophile mainly grows in shrubland in the area between Tathra National Park, Coorow and Watheroo National Park in the southwest of Western Australia.

== Conservation status ==
Petrophile septemfida is classified as "Priority Three" by the Government of Western Australia Department of Parks and Wildlife meaning that it is poorly known and known from only a few locations but is not under imminent threat.
