= Petrophile circinata =

Scientific classification
- Kingdom: Plantae
- Clade: Tracheophytes
- Clade: Angiosperms
- Clade: Eudicots
- Order: Proteales
- Family: Proteaceae
- Genus: Petrophile
- Species: P. circinata

Binomial name
- Petrophile circinata Kippist ex Meisn.

Synonyms
- Petrophila circinata Meisn. orth. var.

Species of shrub endemic to Western Australia

Petrophile circinata is a species of flowering plant in the family Proteaceae and is endemic to the south-west of Western Australia. It is a low, spreading shrub with pinnately-divided, sharply-pointed leaves, and more or less spherical heads of hairy, white, yellow or cream-coloured flowers.

== Description ==
Petrophile circinata is a spreading, ground-hugging shrub that typically grows to a height of 25–80 cm (9.8–31.5 in) and has hairy young branchlets. The leaves are 50–200 mm (2.0–7.9 in) long on a petiole about 13 mm (0.51 in) long. They are pinnately-divided to the midrib with sharply-pointed pinnae 5–22 mm (0.20–0.87 in) long. The flowers are arranged on the ends of branchlets in sessile, more or less spherical heads about 25 mm (0.98 in) in diameter, with many leathery involucral bracts often more than 20 mm (0.79 in) long at the base. The flowers are about 40 mm (1.6 in) long, white, yellow or cream-coloured and hairy. Flowering occurs from June to November and the fruit is a nut, fused with others in a more or less spherical head about 40 mm (1.6 in) in diameter.

== Taxonomy ==
Petrophile circinata was first formally described in 1855 by Carl Meissner in Hooker's Journal of Botany and Kew Garden Miscellany from an unpublished description by Richard Kippist. The type specimens were collected by James Drummond. The specific epithet (circinata) means "rounded".

== Distribution and habitat ==
This petrophile grows in low shrubland, scrub and heath between Pingelly, Boorabbin, Lake Grace and Lake King in the Avon Wheatbelt, Coolgardie, Esperance Plains, Jarrah Forest and Mallee biogeographic regions of southwestern Western Australia.

== Conservation status ==
Petrophile circinata is classified as "not threatened" by the Western Australian Government Department of Parks and Wildlife.
