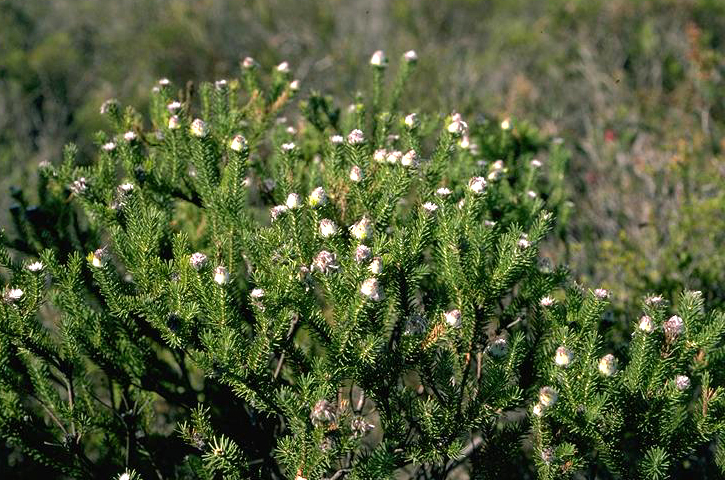
- Near Eneabba

Scientific classification
- Kingdom: Plantae
- Clade: Tracheophytes
- Clade: Angiosperms
- Clade: Eudicots
- Order: Proteales
- Family: Proteaceae
- Genus: Petrophile
- Species: P. scabriuscula

Binomial name
- Petrophile scabriuscula Meisn.

Synonyms
- Petrophila ericifolia var. scabriuscula Benth. orth. var.; Petrophile ericifolia var. scabriuscula (Meisn.) Benth.

= Petrophile scabriuscula =

Species of shrub endemic to Western Australia

Petrophile scabriuscula is a species of flowering plant in the family Proteaceae and is endemic to southwestern Western Australia. It is a dense, prickly shrub with sharply-pointed, needle-shaped leaves more or less pressed against the branchlets, and oval heads of hairy, yellow to creamy-yellow flowers.

== Description ==
Petrophile scabriuscula is a dense, prickly shrub that typically grows to a height of 0.4–1.5 m (1 ft 4 in – 4 ft 11 in) and has softly hairy young branchlets that become glabrous with age. The leaves are needle-shaped, sharply-pointed, 6–11 mm (0.24–0.43 in) long, more or less pressed against the branchlets and softly hairy. The flowers are arranged on the ends of branchlets in sessile, oval heads up to 20 mm (0.79 in) in diameter, with many overlapping involucral bracts at the base. The flowers are 8–14 mm (0.31–0.55 in) long, yellow to creamy-yellow and hairy. Flowering occurs from May to October and the fruit is a nut, fused with others in a spherical to oval head about 10–20 mm (0.39–0.79 in) in diameter.

== Taxonomy ==
Petrophile scabriuscula was first formally described in 1845 by Carl Meissner in Johann Georg Christian Lehmann's book Plantae Preissianae from material collected by James Drummond near the Swan River. The specific epithet (scabriuscula) means "minutely scabrous".

== Distribution and habitat ==
This petrophile grows in sandy woodland from Kalbarri National Park to near Moora in the Avon Wheatbelt, Geraldton Sandplains and Swan Coastal Plain biogeographic regions.

== Conservation status ==
Petrophile scabriuscula is classified as "not threatened" by the Government of Western Australia Department of Parks and Wildlife.
