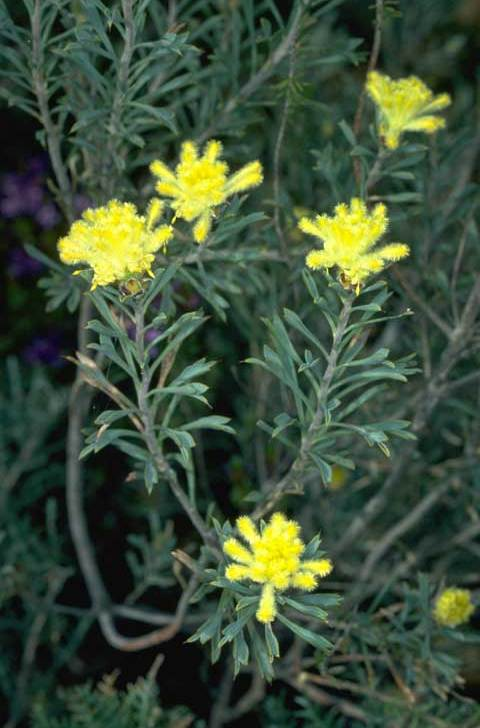
- Near Moora

Conservation status
- Priority Three — Poorly Known Taxa (DEC)

Scientific classification
- Kingdom: Plantae
- Clade: Tracheophytes
- Clade: Angiosperms
- Clade: Eudicots
- Order: Proteales
- Family: Proteaceae
- Genus: Petrophile
- Species: P. plumosa

Binomial name
- Petrophile plumosa Meisn.

= Petrophile plumosa =

Species of shrub endemic to Western Australia

Petrophile plumosa is a species of flowering plant in the family Proteaceae and is endemic to southwestern Western Australia. It is a shrub with rigid, sharply-pointed, sometimes lobed leaves, and more or less spherical heads of hairy, pale yellow flowers.

== Description ==
Petrophile plumosa is a shrub that typically grows to a height of 0.5–1.5 m (1 ft 8 in – 4 ft 11 in) and has hoary branchlets. The leaves are spatula-shaped, flattened, 13–32 mm (0.51–1.26 in) long on a petiole 6–20 mm (0.24–0.79 in) long and sharply-pointed, sometimes with two or three sharply-pointed lobes 2–6 mm (0.079–0.236 in) long. The flowers are arranged on the ends of branchlets in sessile, more or less spherical heads 20–25 mm (0.79–0.98 in) long, with egg-shaped to oblong involucral bracts at the base. The flowers are 15–20 mm (0.59–0.79 in) long, pale yellow and densely hairy. Flowering occurs from July to November and the fruit is a nut, fused with others in an oval head about 25 mm (0.98 in) long.

== Taxonomy ==
Petrophile plumosa was first formally described in 1855 by Carl Meissner in Hooker's Journal of Botany and Kew Garden Miscellany from material collected by James Drummond. The specific epithet (plumosa) means "covered with feathers" referring to the hairy branchlets.

== Distribution and habitat ==
This petrophile grows in shrubland in loamy soils over laterite on sandplain and gravelly hills in the Moore River area.

== Conservation status ==
Petrophile plumosa is classified as "Priority Three" by the Government of Western Australia Department of Parks and Wildlife meaning that it is poorly known and known from only a few locations but is not under imminent threat.
