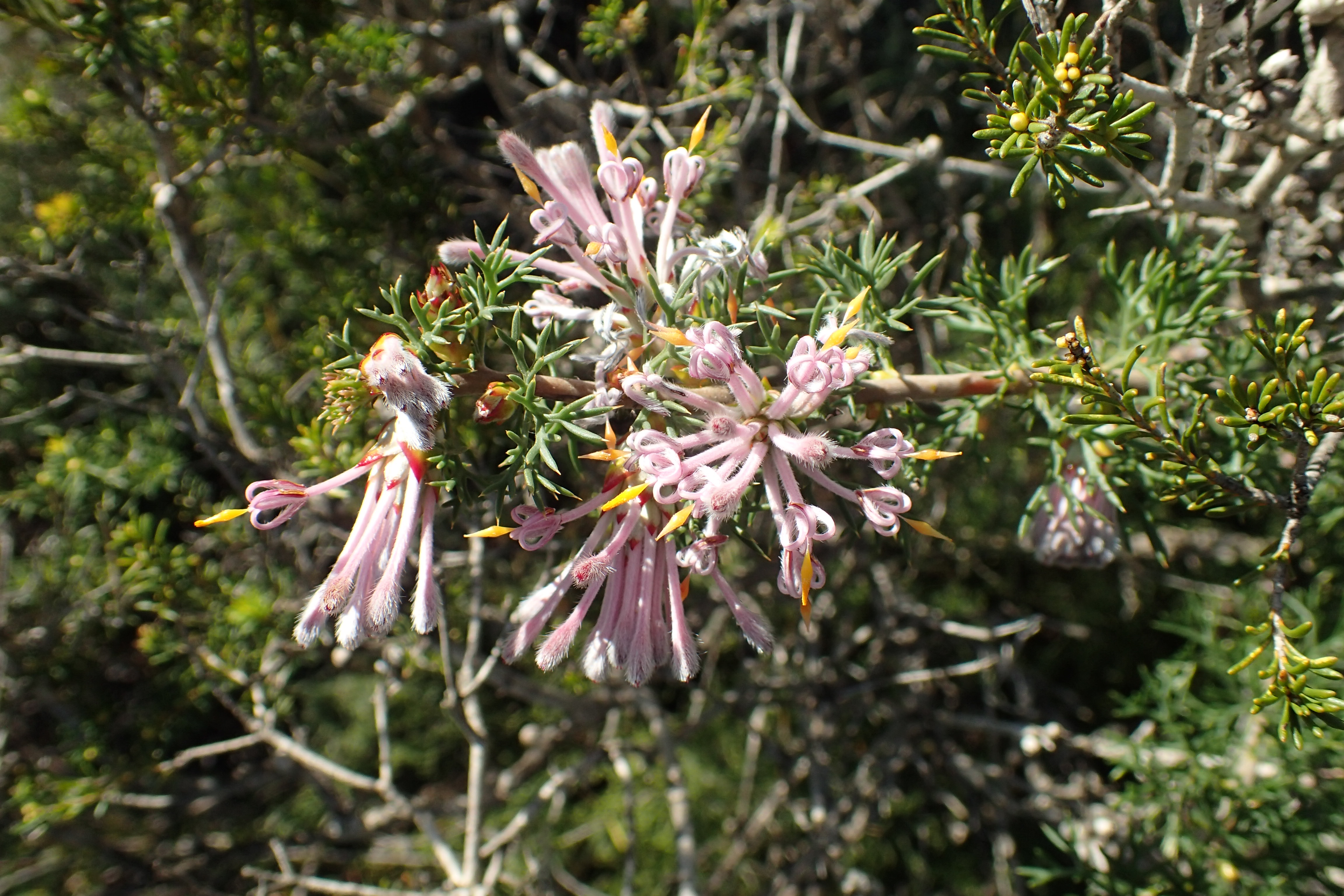

Scientific classification
- Kingdom: Plantae
- Clade: Tracheophytes
- Clade: Angiosperms
- Clade: Eudicots
- Order: Proteales
- Family: Proteaceae
- Genus: Petrophile
- Species: P. axillaris

Binomial name
- Petrophile axillaris Meisn.

Synonyms
- Petrophila axillaris Meisn. orth. var.

= Petrophile axillaris =

Species of shrub endemic to Western Australia

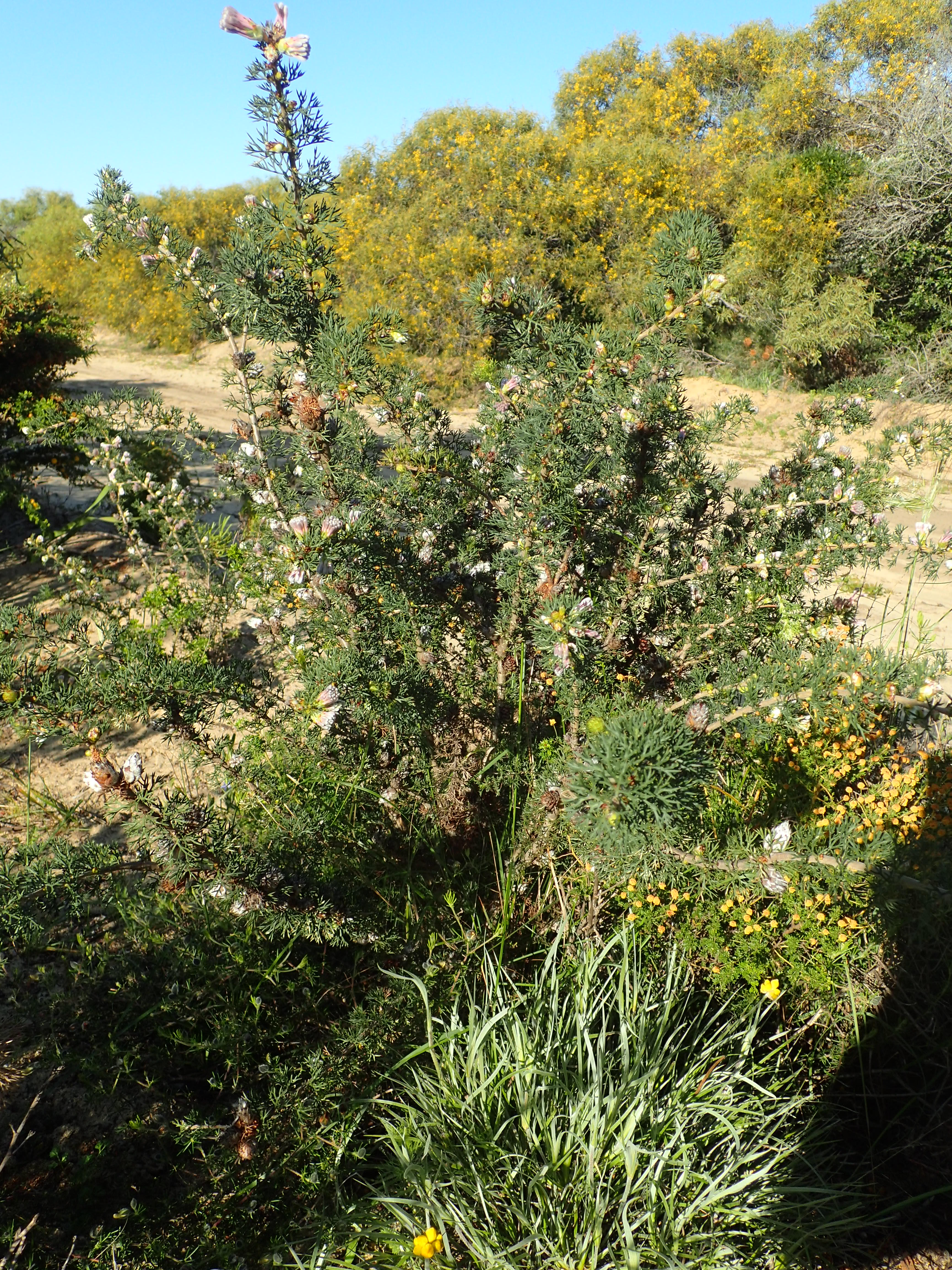
Habit in Drovers Cave National Park

Petrophile axillaris is a species of flowering plant in the family Proteaceae and is endemic to the south-west of Western Australia. It is a shrub with pinnately-divided, sharply-pointed leaves, and spherical heads of hairy pink or grey flowers.

== Description ==
Petrophile axillaris is a shrub that typically grows to a height of 0.5–3 m (1 ft 8 in – 9 ft 10 in) and has ribbed, hairy, grey or brown branchlets. The leaves are pinnately-divided to the midrib, 20–30 mm (0.79–1.18 in) long with twenty-five to seventy-six cylindrical, sharply-pointed lobes. The flowers are mostly arranged in leaf axils in more or less spherical heads 15–25 mm (0.59–0.98 in) long and 17–28 mm (0.67–1.10 in) wide, with elliptic to egg-shaped involucral bracts at the base. The flowers are 14–18 mm (0.55–0.71 in) long, pink or grey and hairy. Flowering mainly occurs from September to November and the fruit is a nut, fused with others in a spherical to oval head 9–20 mm (0.35–0.79 in) long.

== Taxonomy ==
Petrophile axillaris was first formally described in 1855 by Carl Meissner in Hooker's Journal of Botany and Kew Garden Miscellany from material collected by James Drummond. The specific epithet (axillaris) means "axillary", referring to the flowers.

== Distribution and habitat ==
This petrophile grows in sandy or gravelly limestone soils in near-coastal areas between Geraldton and Yalgorup National Park and disjunctly in the Leeuwin-Naturaliste National Park in southwestern Western Australia.

== Conservation status ==
Petrophile axillaris is classified as "not threatened" by the Western Australian Government Department of Parks and Wildlife.
