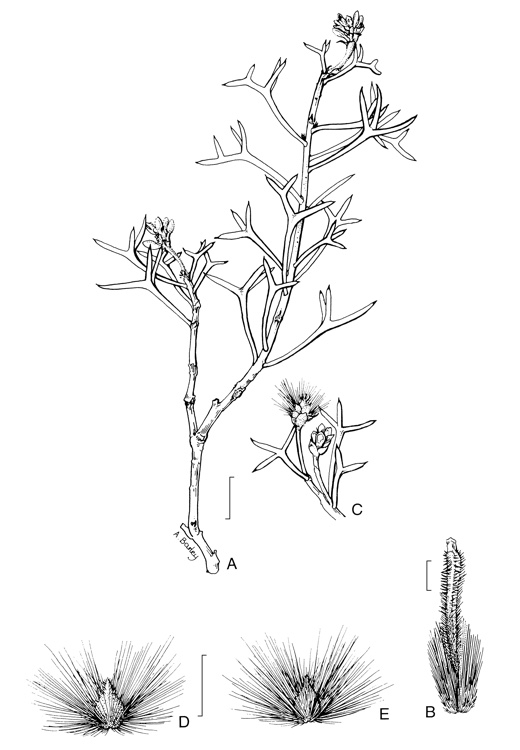
- A=flowering branchlet; B=flower; C=fruiting branchlet; D, E=upper and lower surfaces of nut

Conservation status
- Priority Three — Poorly Known Taxa (DEC)

Scientific classification
- Kingdom: Plantae
- Clade: Tracheophytes
- Clade: Angiosperms
- Clade: Eudicots
- Order: Proteales
- Family: Proteaceae
- Genus: Petrophile
- Species: P. pauciflora

Binomial name
- Petrophile pauciflora Foreman

= Petrophile pauciflora =

Species of shrub endemic to Western Australia

Petrophile pauciflora is a species of flowering plant in the family Proteaceae and is endemic to western areas of Western Australia. It is a shrub usually with three-forked leaves, the lobes sharply-pointed, and spherical heads of small groups of hairy yellow or orange flowers.

== Description ==
Petrophile pauciflora is a shrub that typically grows to a height of 0.5–1 m (1 ft 8 in – 3 ft 3 in) and has hairy young branchlets and leaves that become glabrous as they age. The leaves are 15–35 mm (0.59–1.38 in) long and cylindrical but three-forked, the middle segment sometimes divided again, each segment sharply-pointed. The flowers are arranged near the ends of branchlets in spherical heads about 8 mm (0.31 in) in diameter, with egg-shaped involucral bracts at the base. The heads contain only a few flowers, each about 7 mm (0.28 in) long, yellow or orange, and hairy. Flowering has been observed in September and the fruit is a nut, fused with others in an oval or spherical head 6–8 mm (0.24–0.31 in) long.

== Taxonomy ==
Petrophile pauciflora was first formally described in 1995 by Donald Bruce Foreman in Flora of Australia from material collected by Alex George near Bimbijy Station in 1976. The specific epithet (pauciflora) means "few-flowered".

== Distribution and habitat ==
This petrophile grows in low, open heathland on breakaway areas in a few locations in the Avon Wheatbelt, Murchison and Yalgoo biogeographic regions of Western Australia.

== Conservation status ==
Petrophile pauciflora is classified as "Priority Three" by the Government of Western Australia Department of Parks and Wildlife meaning that it is poorly known and known from only a few locations but is not under imminent threat.
