= List of heritage places in the Shire of Coorow =

List of heritage sites in Western Australia

As of 2026, 76 places are heritage-listed in the Shire of Coorow, of which none are on the State Register of Heritage Places, which is maintained by the Heritage Council of Western Australia.

== List ==
The following places are heritage listed in the Shire of Coorow:

| Place name | Place # | Street # | Street name | Suburb or town | Notes & former names | Photo |
|---|---|---|---|---|---|---|
| Coorow Hotel | 584 | | Main Street | Coorow | Halfway House | |
| Mount Lesueur National Park | 5855 | East of | Cockleshell Gully Road | Jurien | | |
| Railway Barracks, Coorow | 5893 | 15 | Station Street | Coorow | | |
| Coorow Shire Offices and Library | 6413 | Corner | Main & Bristol Streets | Coorow | | |
| Coorow District Hall & Coorow Honour Roll | 6414 | Cne | Main & Commercial Streets | Coorow | | |
| Original Coorow Hall - Site | 6415 | 1 | South Street | Coorow | | |
| RSL Memorial Hall & Field Gun | 6416 | | Poynton Parade | Coorow | Coorow Pre-Primary Centre | |
| Coorow Primary School | 6417 | | Bristol Street | Coorow | | |
| Coorow Primary School - Site | 6418 | 1 | South Street | Coorow | | |
| Scout Hall | 6419 | | Spain Street | Coorow | | |
| CWA Building | 6420 | Corner | Bristol & Main Streets | Coorow | Infant Health Centre | |
| Our Lady of the Rosary Catholic Church | 6421 | Corner | Commercial & North Streets | Coorow | | |
| All Saints Church | 6422 | Corner | Commercial & Central Streets | Coorow | | |
| Coorow Masonic Lodge | 6423 | | Main Street | Coorow | | |
| Coorow Highway Store | 6424 | | Poynton Parade & Main Street | Coorow | | |
| Wesfarmers Building | 6425 | | Main Street | Coorow | | |
| Coorow Bakery | 6426 | | Main Street | Coorow | Wells Bakery, Tearooms & Butcher's Shop | |
| Coorow Post Office | 6427 | | Main Street | Coorow | | |
| King George Hostel & Casey's Store - site | 6428 | | Main Street | Coorow | | |
| Billiard Room & Barber's Shop - Site | 6429 | | Commercial Street | Coorow | | |
| Coorow's Inn | 6430 | Corner | Poynton Parade & Central Avenue | Coorow | | |
| Blacksmith's Shop (former) | 6431 | Lot 50 | Commercial Street | Coorow | | |
| Blacksmith's Residence (former) | 6432 | Lot 49 | Commercial Street | Coorow | | |
| Hirst's Garage (former) | 6433 | Lot 4 | Poynton Parade | Coorow | | |
| Maley Park | 6434 | | Bothe Street | Coorow | | |
| Coorow Bowling Club | 6435 | | Main Street | Coorow | | |
| Bingham's House and Store | 6436 | 18/19 | Station Street | Coorow | | |
| Mornington | 6437 | | Poynton Parade & Central Street | Coorow | | |
| Bingham's House (former) | 6438 | | Poynton Parade | Coorow | Waldeck's House | |
| Karingal | 6439 | | Main Street | Coorow | | |
| Railway Cottage (1) | 6440 | | Poynton Parade | Coorow | | |
| Railway Cottage (2) | 6441 | | Poynton Parade | Coorow | | |
| Railway Cottage (3) | 6442 | | Poynton Parade | Coorow | | |
| Coorow Station and Residence Site | 6443 | | Poynton Parade Railway Reserve | Coorow | | |
| Coorow Railway Dam Sites | 6444 | | Poynton Parade Railway Reserve | Coorow | | |
| Coorow Grain Receival Depot (Original Site) | 6445 | | Poynton Parade Railway Reserve | Coorow | | |
| Curunger Well - Site | 6446 | | Coorow-Latham Road | Coorow | Curingi | |
| Salk Lake Well site | 6447 | | Midlands Road | Coorow | | |
| Waddi Forest Hall, Tennis Courts & Cricket Pitch | 6448 | | | Waddi Forest | | |
| Waddi Forest Telephone Exchange and Store | 6449 | | Coorow-Latham Road | Waddi Forest | | |
| Waddi Forest School Site | 6450 | | Coorow-Latham Road | Waddi Forest | | |
| Marchagee Roadhouse | 6451 | | Midlands Road south of Coorow Townsite | Coorow | | |
| Waddy Well School Site | 6452 | | East Boundary Road & Coorow-Latham Road | Coorow | | |
| Long Homestead Site | 6453 | | Coorow Farm | Coorow | | |
| Waddy Waddy House | 6454 | | | Latham | | |
| Shenton's House | 6455 | | Belpa-Shenton Road | Coorow | | |
| Orana | 6456 | | East Boundary Road | Coorow | | |
| Enfield Park | 6457 | | Lampard Road | Coorow | | |
| Raywood | 6458 | | Lampard Road | Coorow | | |
| Koobabbie Homestead and Outbuildings | 6459 | | South Waddi Road | Coorow | | |
| Turipa | 6460 | | Jones Road | Coorow | | |
| Lonsdale | 6461 | | Midlands Road | Coorow | | |
| The Parsonage | 6462 | | South Waddi Road | Coorow | | |
| Liebe Shed No. 3 | 6465 | | East Boundary Road | Coorow | | |
| Jessie Day Grave Site | 6466 | South of | Coorow-Latham Road | Coorow | | |
| Nabappie Spring site | 6467 | | Junjun Road | Coorow | | |
| Gnamma Hole | 6468 | | Junjun Road | Coorow | | |
| Jun Jun Spring Site | 6469 | | Junjun Road | Coorow | | |
| Patton's Dam - Site of | 6470 | | Coorow-Latham Road | Coorow | | |
| Stockyard Gully Caves | 6471 | | Cockleshell Gully Road | Warradarge | Stockyard Gully Nature Reserve | |
| Little Three Springs | 6472 | | Cockleshell Gully Road | Warradarge | Three Springs | |
| Army Well Site | 6473 | | Leeman Caravan Site | Leeman | | |
| Tea Tree Point | 6474 | | | Leeman | | |
| McTaggart's Jetty | 6475 | | | Leeman | Wann's Jetty | |
| Leeman Primary School | 6476 | | | Leeman | Snag Island School | |
| Leeman Roadhouse and Post Office | 6477 | | Nairn Street | Leeman | Truscott's Milk Bar | |
| Queen of Peace Catholic Church | 6478 | | Morcombe Road | Leeman | | |
| McTaggart Cottage | 6479 | 7 | Nairn Street | Leeman | | |
| Wilson's Cottage | 6480 | 3 | Nairn Street | Leeman | | |
| Morphett's Receival Depot - Site | 6481 | | | Green Head | | |
| Old Stock Route | 6482 | | Stock Route | Coorow | | |
| Leeman Police Station | 17435 | | Morcombe Road | Leeman | | |
| Three Railway Cottages, Coorow | 17875 | | Poynton Parade | Coorow | Per-way Single Men's Quarters (Duplex), Per-way Married Men's Cottage | |
| Liebe Shed No.2 | 24418 | | Lampard Tremlett Road | Waddy Forest | | |
| Liebe Shed No.l | 24457 | | Waddy Forest Road | Waddy Forest | | |
| North West Stock Route | 25092 | | | Star Swam to Walkaway | Old North Stock Route, Old North Road, Champion Bay Stock Route | |
