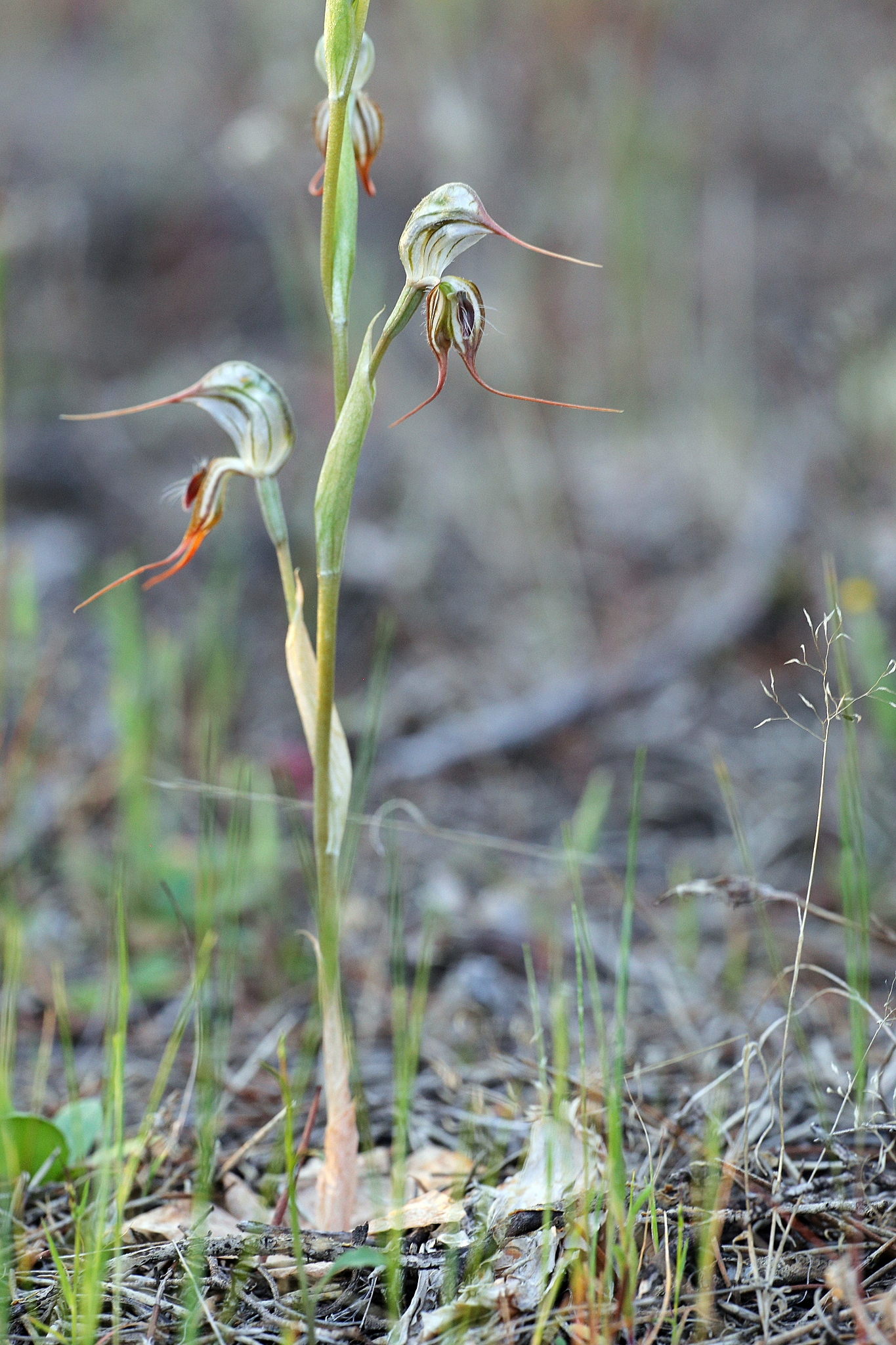
- Near Lake Eganu in the Shire of Coorow

Scientific classification
- Kingdom: Plantae
- Clade: Tracheophytes
- Clade: Angiosperms
- Clade: Monocots
- Order: Asparagales
- Family: Orchidaceae
- Subfamily: Orchidoideae
- Tribe: Cranichideae
- Genus: Pterostylis
- Species: P. exserta

Binomial name
- Pterostylis exserta (D.L.Jones D.L.Jones

Synonyms
- Oligochaetochilus exsertus D.L.Jones; Oligochaetochilus sp. exserted labellum (A.C.Beauglehole 12194); Pterostylis aff. rufa; Pterostylis sp. Arrowsmith; Pterostylis sp. Arrowsmith; Pterostylis sp. exserted labellum; Pterostylis sp. exserted labellum (A.C.Beauglehole 12194)

= Pterostylis exserta =

Exserted rufous greenhood

Species of orchid

Pterostylis exserta, commonly known as the exserted rufous greenhood, is a species of orchid endemic to the south-west of Western Australia. Both flowering and non-flowering plants have a large rosette of leaves flat on the ground and flowering plants have up to seven pale, transparent green and white flowers with brownish lines.

== Description ==
Pterostylis exserta is a terrestrial, perennial, deciduous, herb with an underground tuber and a rosette of leaves 20–70 mm (0.8–3 in) in diameter. Flowering plants have up to seven, well-spaced flowers 30–40 mm (1–2 in) long and 6–7 mm (0.2–0.3 in) wide on a flowering stem 100–350 mm (4–10 in) high. The flowers are transparent green and white with brownish veins. The dorsal sepal and petals are fused, forming a hood or "galea" over the column. The lateral sepals turn downwards and suddenly taper to narrow, thread-like tips which spread apart from each other. The labellum is brown, insect-like and stands out from the lateral sepals, with many short hairs on the "head" end and longer bristles on the side of the "body". Flowering occurs from lae August to October.

== Taxonomy and naming ==
The exserted rufous greenhood was first formally described in 2015 by David Jones and given the name Oligochaetochilus exsertus. The description was published in Australian Orchid Review from a specimen collected near Gunyidi. In 2015 David Jones changed the name to Pterostylis exserta "to allow for the different taxonomic views held at generic level within the subtribe". The species had previously been known as Pterostylis sp. 'exserted labellum'. The specific epithet (exserta) is a Latin word meaning "projecting" or "thrust forth", referring to the way the labellum is raised above the lateral sepals.

== Distribution and habitat ==
The exserted rufous greenhood grows in shrubland, mallee woodland, and near granite outcrops between Eneabba and Hyden in the Avon Wheatbelt, Geraldton Sandplains and Mallee biogeographic regions.

== Conservation ==
Pterostylis exserta is classified as "not threatened" by the Western Australian Government Department of Parks and Wildlife.
