= Grevillea metamorpha =

Conservation status
- Data Deficient (IUCN 3.1)

- Priority One — Poorly Known Taxa (DEC)

Scientific classification
- Kingdom: Plantae
- Clade: Tracheophytes
- Clade: Angiosperms
- Clade: Eudicots
- Order: Proteales
- Family: Proteaceae
- Genus: Grevillea
- Species: G. metamorpha

Binomial name
- Grevillea metamorpha Makinson

Species of shrub endemic to Western Australia

Grevillea metamorpha is a species of flowering plant in the family Proteaceae and is endemic to an area in the Mid West region of Western Australia. It is an erect, spindly shrub with three types of divided leaves, and clusters of white, silky-hairy flowers.

== Description ==
Grevillea metamorpha is an erect, spindly shrub that typically grows to a height of up to about 1.5 m (4 ft 11 in), its branchelts covered with soft, woolly hairs. There are three types of divided leaves 14–24 mm (0.55–0.94 in) long and 8–15 mm (0.31–0.59 in) wide in outline, on mature plants. Leaves on non-flowering branches are wedge-shaped to trowel-shaped with five more or less triangular lobes 1–4 mm (0.039–0.157 in) long and 1–3 mm (0.039–0.118 in) wide. Leaves on the lower part of branches bearing flowers are deeply divided with three lobes, the lobes further divided with triangular lobes 2–6 mm (0.079–0.236 in) long and 1–2 mm (0.039–0.079 in) wide. Leaves nearest the flowers are similar to the latter, sometimes more deeply divided with up to five narrowly triangular to linear lobes 4–10 mm (0.16–0.39 in) long and about 1 mm (0.039 in) wide. The flowers are arranged in dome-shaped clusters and are white and silky-hairy, the pistil about 3 mm (0.12 in) long. Flowering occurs in September, and the fruit is an elliptic follicle 9–10 mm (0.35–0.39 in) long.

== Taxonomy ==
Grevillea metamorpha was first formally described in 2000 by Robert Makinson in the Flora of Australia from specimens collected by Michael Clyde Hislop near the Green Head-Coorow road in 1995. The specific epithet (metamorpha) means "changing form", referring to the transition in leaf form on the floral branches.

== Distribution and habitat ==
This grevillea is only known from the type location in the Geraldton Sandplains bioregion of south-western Western Australia, where it grows along a creekline.

== Conservation status ==
Grevillea metamorpha is listed as priority one by the Government of Western Australia Department of Biodiversity, Conservation and Attractions, meaning that it is known from only one or a few locations which are potentially at risk.

== See also ==
- List of Grevillea species
