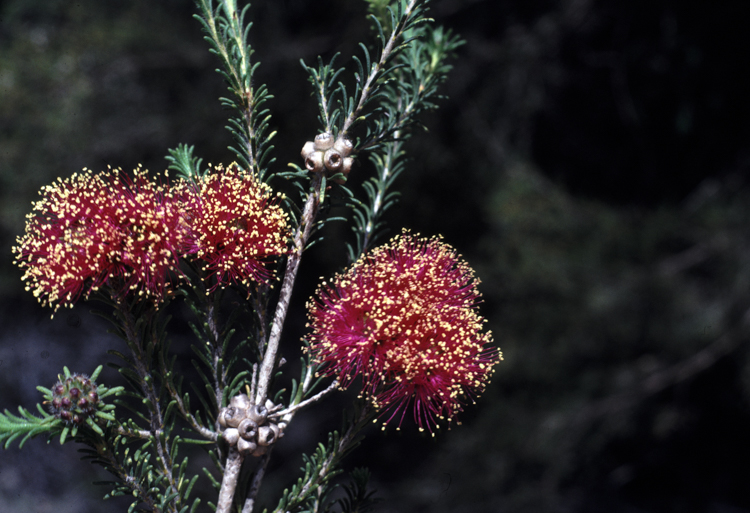

Scientific classification
- Kingdom: Plantae
- Clade: Tracheophytes
- Clade: Angiosperms
- Clade: Eudicots
- Clade: Rosids
- Order: Myrtales
- Family: Myrtaceae
- Genus: Melaleuca
- Species: M. beardii

Binomial name
- Melaleuca beardii Craven

= Melaleuca beardii =

Species of flowering plant

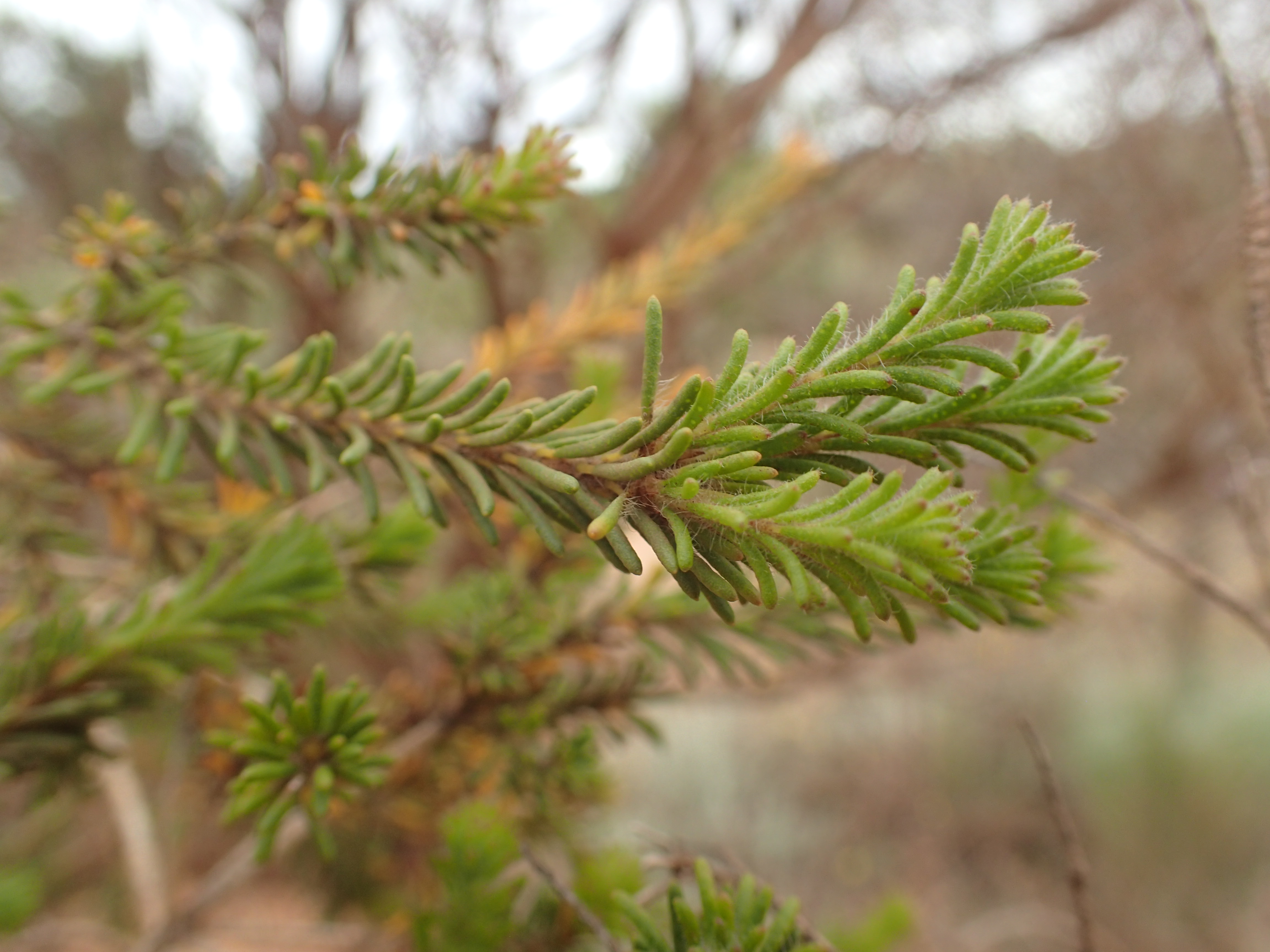
Foliage

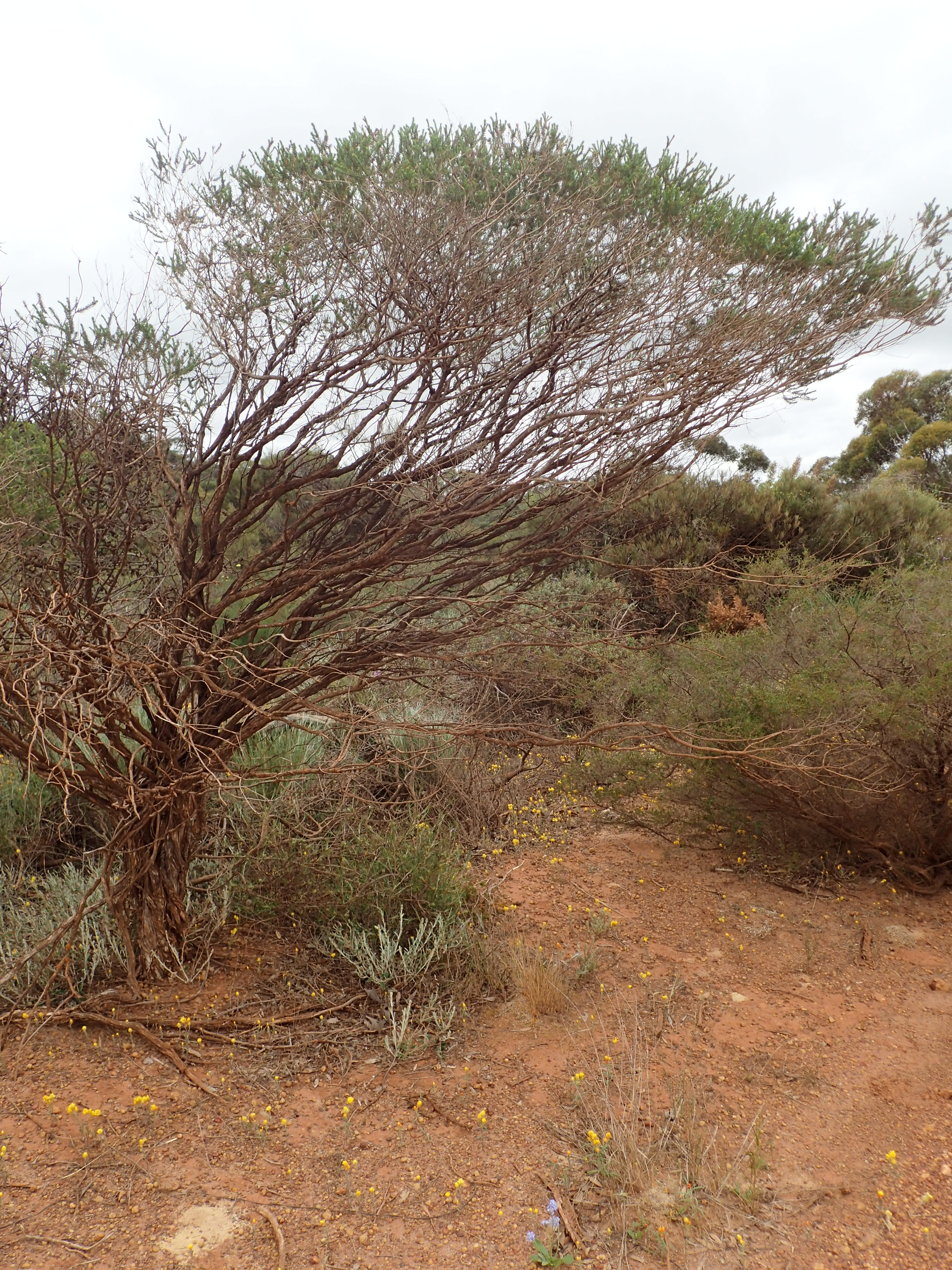
Habit near Dudawa in the Shire of Three Springs

Melaleuca beardii is a plant in the myrtle family, Myrtaceae and is endemic to the south-west of Western Australia. It is similar to a number of other Western Australian melaleucas such as M. trichophylla with its purple pom-pom flower heads but unlike others, the tips of its leaves are rounded rather than pointed.

== Description ==
Melaleuca beardii grows to a height of 2.5 m (8 ft) with stems and leaves that are glabrous except when young. Its leaves are arranged alternately, linear or narrow egg-shaped, 4.8–10.5 mm (0.2–0.4 in) long, 0.6–0.8 mm (0.02–0.03 in) wide with a rounded tip.

The flowers are a shade of pink to purple and arranged in heads on the ends of branches which continue to grow after flowering, sometimes also in the upper leaf axils. The heads are up to 25 mm (1 in) in diameter and contain between 3 and 6 groups of flowers in threes. The stamens are arranged in bundles of five around the flower, with 8 to 13 stamens in each bundle. The flowering season is from October to December and is followed by fruit which are woody capsules, 3–5 mm (0.1–0.2 in) long in clusters. The clusters do not form a football shape as in some similar melaleucas.

== Taxonomy and naming ==
Melaleuca beardii was first formally described in 1999 by Lyndley Craven and Brendan Lepschi in Australian Systematic Botany from a specimen collected near Carnamah. The specific epithet (beardii) is in honour of John Stanley Beard, an Australian ecologist.

== Distribution and habitat ==
This melaleuca occurs in the Arrino and Gunyidi districts in the Avon Wheatbelt and Geraldton Sandplains biogeographic regions where it grows in sand on sandplains.

== Conservation status ==
Melaleuca beardii is listed as not threatened by the Government of Western Australia Department of Parks and Wildlife.
