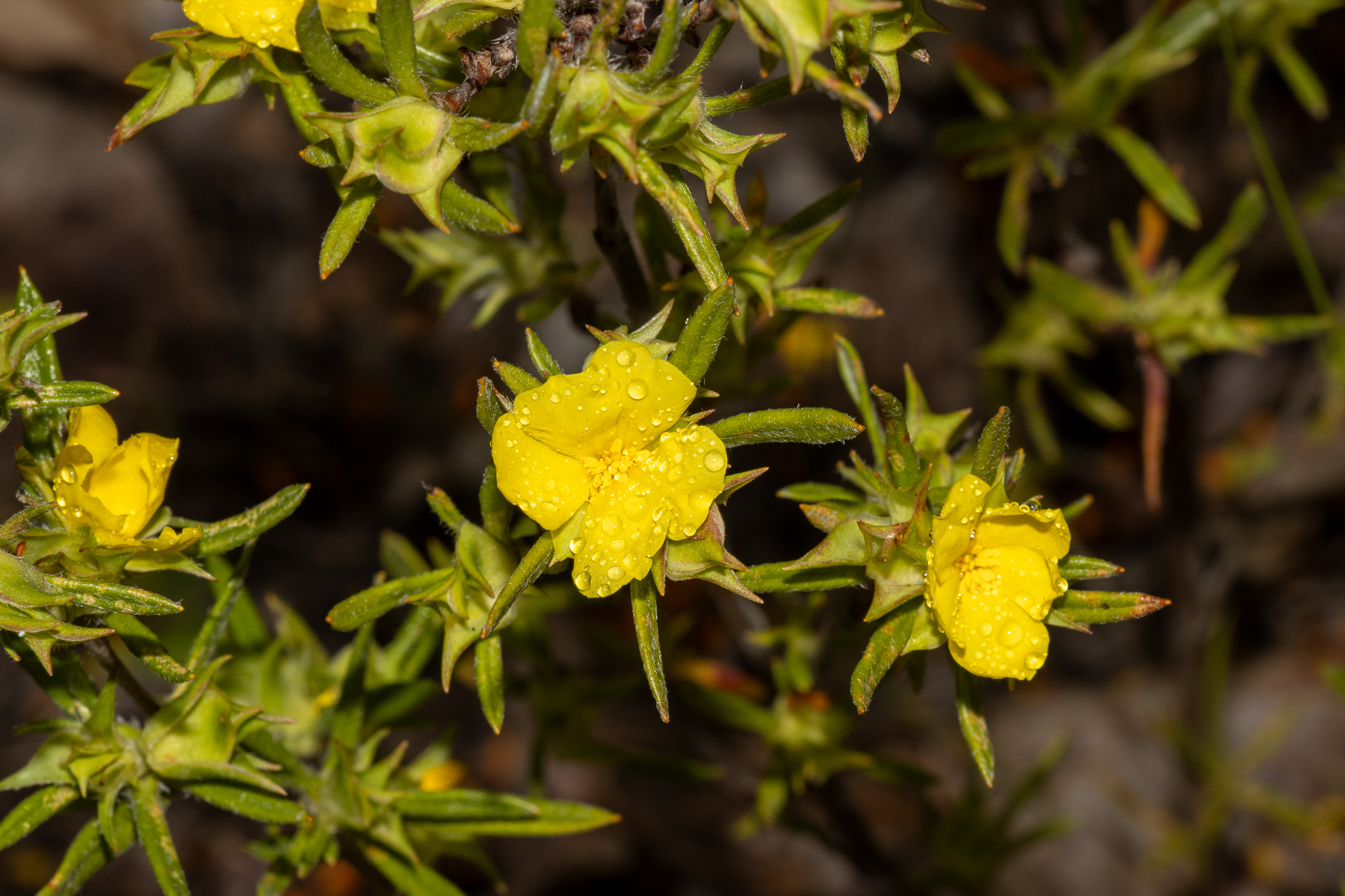

Scientific classification
- Kingdom: Plantae
- Clade: Tracheophytes
- Clade: Angiosperms
- Clade: Eudicots
- Order: Dilleniales
- Family: Dilleniaceae
- Genus: Hibbertia
- Species: H. squarrosa

Binomial name
- Hibbertia squarrosa K.R.Thiele

= Hibbertia squarrosa =

Species of flowering plant

Hibbertia squarrosa is a species of flowering plant in the family Dilleniaceae and is endemic to the west of Western Australia. It is an erect shrub with linear leaves and yellow flowers with twenty stamens arranged around five glabrous carpels.

== Description ==
Hibbertia squarrosa is an erect shrub that typically grows to a height of 20–50 cm (7.9–19.7 in), its branchlets covered with tangled, greyish hairs. The leaves are linear, mostly 15–20 mm (0.59–0.79 in) long and 1–2 mm (0.039–0.079 in) wide with the edges rolled under, obscuring the lower surface. The flowers are arranged singly or in small groups and sessile with linear to rectangular bracts 5–7 mm (0.20–0.28 in) long at the base. The five sepals are broadly triangular to broadly egg-shaped, 8–11 mm (0.31–0.43 in) long and covered with silky hairs. The five petals are yellow, 9–10 mm (0.35–0.39 in) long and egg-shaped with the narrower end towards the base and there are twenty stamens arranged around the five glabrous carpels, each carpel with a single ovule. Flowering mainly occurs from September to November.

== Taxonomy ==
Hibbertia squarrosa was first formally described in 2018 by Kevin Thiele in the journal Nuytsia from specimens collected near the Coorow-Green Head Road in 2016. The specific epithet (squarrosa) means "rough with stiff scales", referring to the sepals.

== Distribution and habitat ==
This species grows in shrubland and has mainly been recorded from the area between Dongara and Cataby in the Geraldton Sandplains bioregion in the west of Western Australia.

== Conservation status ==
Hibbertia squarrosa is classified as "not threatened" by the Government of Western Australia Department of Biodiversity, Conservation and Attractions.

== See also ==
- List of Hibbertia species
