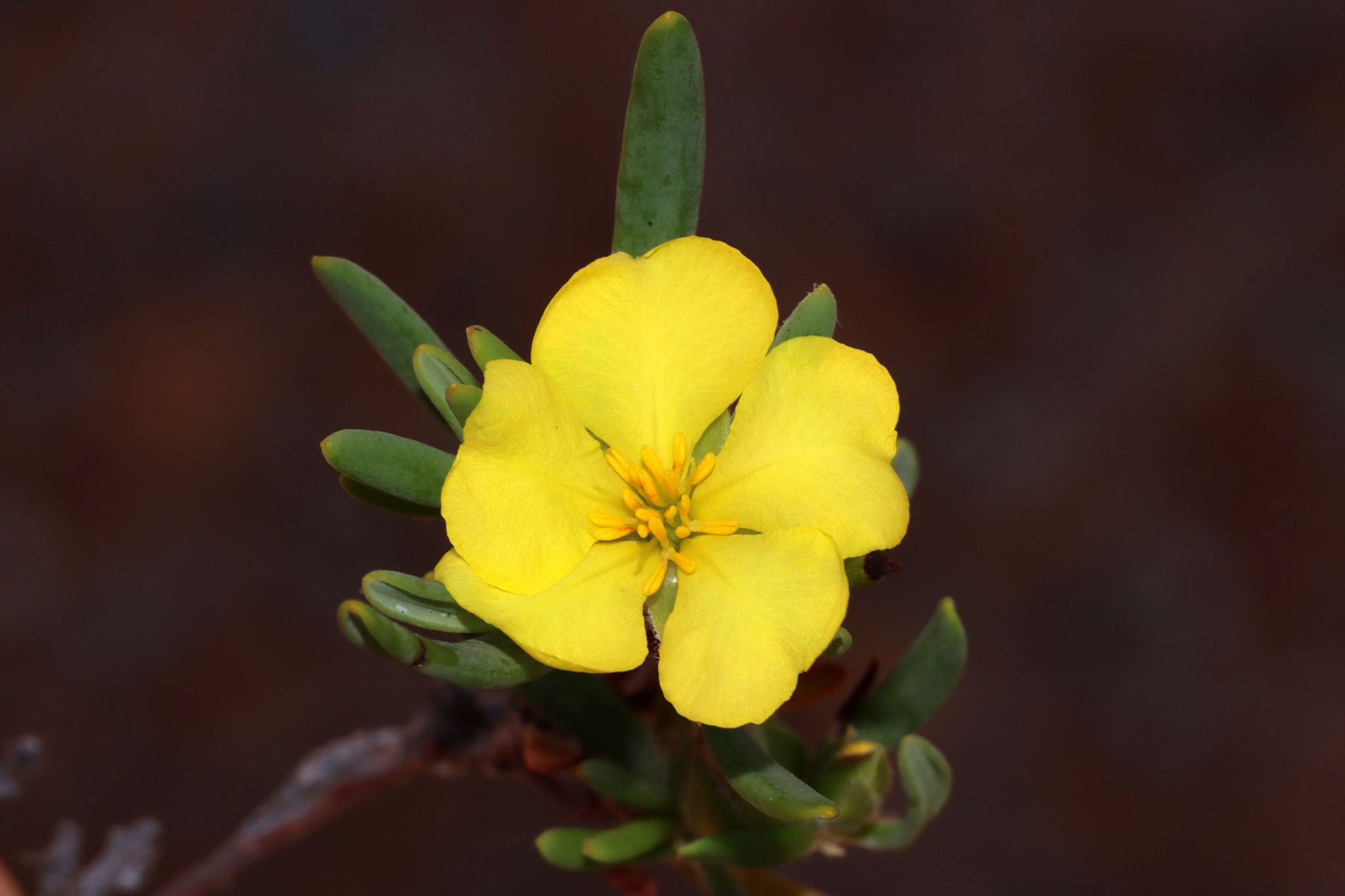
- At Warradarge

Scientific classification
- Kingdom: Plantae
- Clade: Tracheophytes
- Clade: Angiosperms
- Clade: Eudicots
- Order: Dilleniales
- Family: Dilleniaceae
- Genus: Hibbertia
- Species: H. leucocrossa

Binomial name
- Hibbertia leucocrossa K.R.Thiele

= Hibbertia leucocrossa =

Species of flowering plant

Hibbertia leucocrossa is a species of flowering plant in the family Dilleniaceae and is endemic to the south-west of Western Australia. It is a spreading to more or less erect shrub with narrow egg-shaped leaves and yellow flowers, with 15 to 21 stamens arranged in bundles around the three carpels.

== Description ==
Hibbertia leucocrossa is a spreading to more or less erect shrub that typically grows to a height of up to 30 cm (12 in) with papery bark and dense hairs on the younger stems. The leaves are narrow egg-shaped with the narrower end towards the base, 20–30 mm (0.79–1.18 in) long and 2–3 mm (0.079–0.118 in) wide and sessile with a fringe of white hairs at the base of the older leaves. The flowers are arranged singly on the ends of branchlets and short side shoots and are more or less sessile. There are triangular bracts 3–4 mm (0.12–0.16 in) long at the base of the flower. The five sepals are 8–9 mm (0.31–0.35 in) long and joined at the base, and the five petals are yellow, egg-shaped with the narrower end towards the base and 10–12 mm (0.39–0.47 in) long with a notch at the tip. There are 15 to 21 stamens arranged in five bundles around the three glabrous carpels that each contain a single ovule.

== Taxonomy ==
Hibbertia leucocrossa was first formally described in 2009 Kevin Thiele in the journal Nuytsia from specimens he collected at Warradarge in 2008. The specific epithet (leucocrossa) means "white fringed".

== Distribution and habitat ==
This hibbertia grows in low woodland and heath near Warradarge, on the Gairdner Range and near Green Head in the Geraldton Sandplains biogeographic region of south-western Western Australia.

== Conservation status ==
Hibbertia leptopus is classified as "not threatened" by the Western Australian Government Department of Parks and Wildlife.

== See also ==
- List of Hibbertia species
