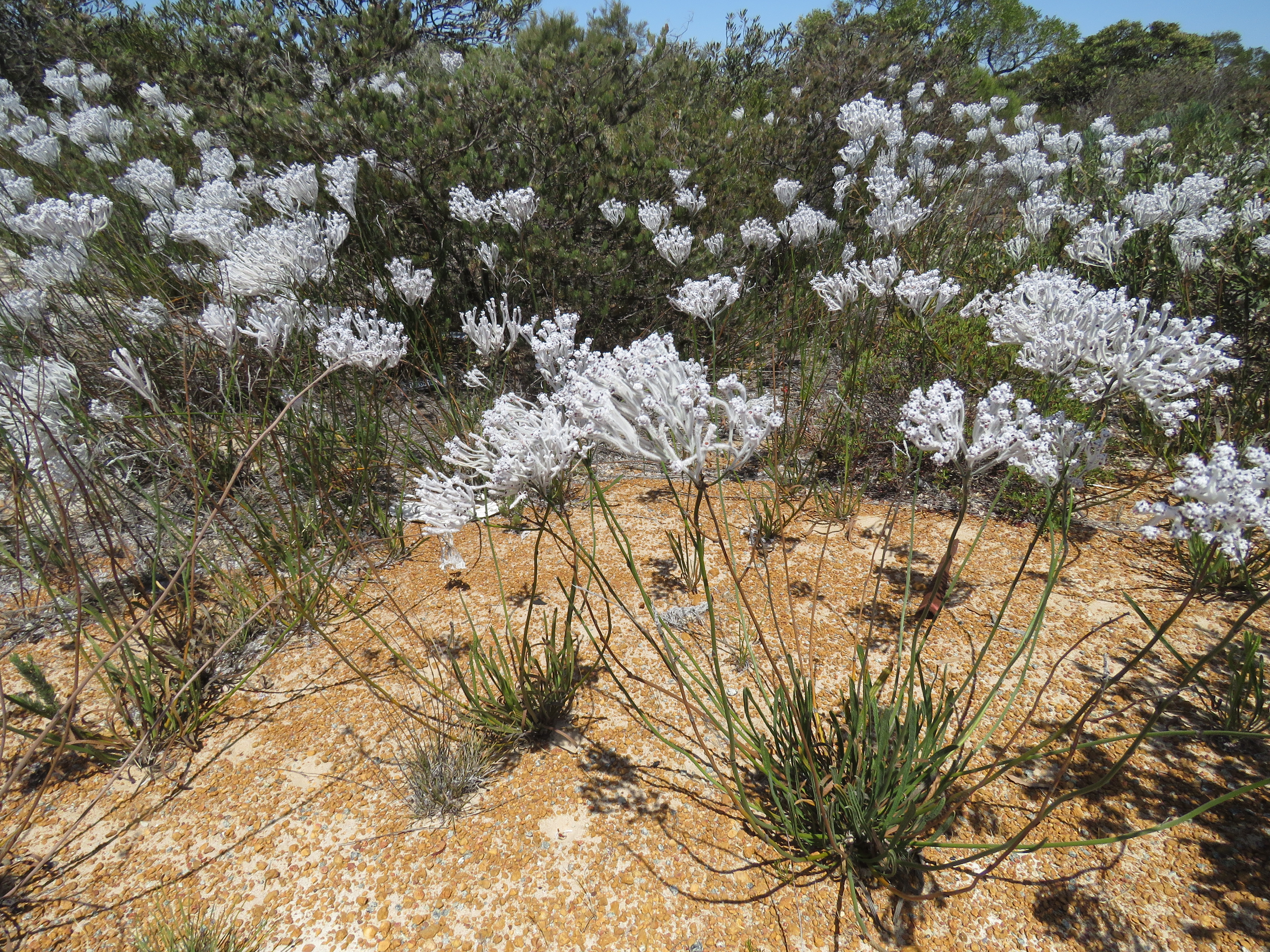
- Near Warradarge

Scientific classification
- Kingdom: Plantae
- Clade: Tracheophytes
- Clade: Angiosperms
- Clade: Eudicots
- Order: Proteales
- Family: Proteaceae
- Genus: Conospermum
- Species: C. crassinervium

Binomial name
- Conospermum crassinervium Meisn.

Synonyms
- Conospermum crassinervium Meisn. nom. inval., nom. nud.

= Conospermum crassinervium =

Species of Australian shrub

Conospermum crassinervium, commonly known as summer smokebush or tassel smokebush, is a species of flowering plant in the family Proteaceae, and is endemic to the south-west of Western Australia. It is a low, tufted shrub with clustered leaves arranged at the base of the plant and corymbs of spikes of white to grey, hairy, tube-shaped flowers.

== Description ==
Conospermum crassinervium is a low, erect shrub that typically grows to a height of 0.6–1.5 m (2 ft 0 in – 4 ft 11 in) when in flower, otherwise about 40 cm (16 in). Its leaves are spreading, clustered and linear at the base of the plant, 38–300 mm (1.5–11.8 in) long and 1.5–15 mm (0.059–0.591 in) wide and covered with woolly hairs, at least at first. The flowers are arranged in a corymb of spikes on a woolly hairy peduncle 600–1,300 mm (24–51 in) long. The bracteoles are lance-shaped, 5–9 mm (0.20–0.35 in) long and 1.0–2.5 mm (0.039–0.098 in) wide and covered with white, woolly hairs. The perianth is white to grey and covered with shaggy hairs, and forms a tube 1.3–3.5 mm (0.051–0.138 in) long. The upper lip has shaggy hairs and is maroon brown inside, the lower lip is joined for 2.0–3.75 mm (0.079–0.148 in) with oblong lobes 1.0–1.6 mm (0.039–0.063 in) long and 0.25 mm (0.0098 in) wide. Flowering occurs from November to January and the fruit is a hairy nut, 2.5–3.0 mm (0.098–0.118 in) long and 2.0–2.75 mm (0.079–0.108 in) wide.

== Taxonomy ==
Conospermum crassinervium was first formally described in 1856 by the botanist Carl Meissner in Augustin Pyramus de Candolles book Prodromus Systematis Naturalis Regni Vegetabilis from specimens collected near the Swan River Colony by James Drummond. The specific epithet (crassinervium) means "thick veins".

== Distribution and habitat ==
Summer smokebush is found on hill slopes and sand plain areas between Eneabba and Bullsbrook in the Avon Wheatbelt, Geraldton Sandplains, Jarrah Forest and Swan Coastal Plain bioregions of south-western Western Australia where it grows in sandy soils often over laterite or limestone.

== Uses ==
The plant is suitable for the production of cut flowers although the yield is low. The flowers also dry well.
