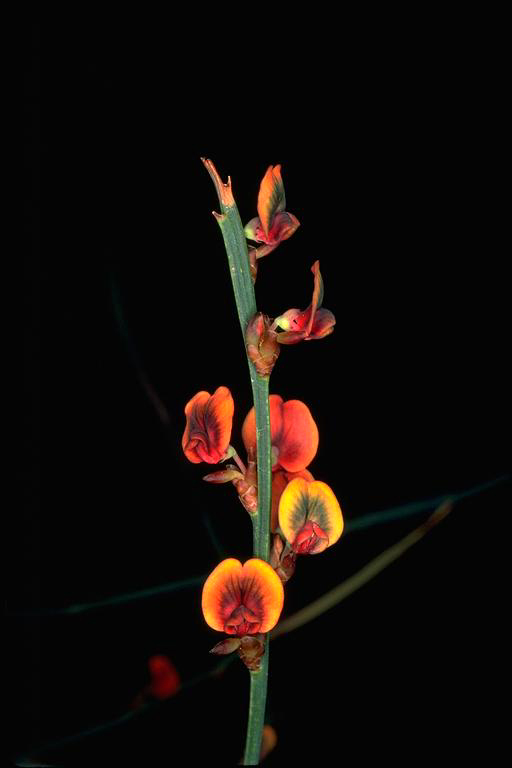
- In the Australian National Botanic Gardens

Conservation status
- Priority Three — Poorly Known Taxa (DEC)

Scientific classification
- Kingdom: Plantae
- Clade: Tracheophytes
- Clade: Angiosperms
- Clade: Eudicots
- Clade: Rosids
- Order: Fabales
- Family: Fabaceae
- Subfamily: Faboideae
- Genus: Daviesia
- Species: D. pteroclada

Binomial name
- Daviesia pteroclada Crisp

= Daviesia pteroclada =

Species of legume

Daviesia pteroclada is a species of flowering plant in the family Fabaceae and is endemic to the south-west of Western Australia. It is a leafless, broom-like, glabrous shrub, its branchlets modified as cladodes, and has orange and dark red flowers.

== Description ==
Daviesia pteroclada is a leafless, glabrous, broom-like shrub that typically grows to a height of 0.6–1.8 m (2 ft 0 in – 5 ft 11 in). Its branchlets are erect and modified as winged or flattened cladodes 1.5–3.5 mm (0.059–0.138 in) wide. The flowers are arranged in leaf axils in groups of two to four on a peduncle up to 1 mm (0.039 in) long, each flower on a pedicel 2.5–3.5 mm (0.098–0.138 in) long with spatula-shaped bracts about 5 mm (0.20 in) long at the base. The sepals are 2.0–2.5 mm (0.079–0.098 in) long and joined at the base the upper two lobes joined for most of their length and the lower three triangular and about 0.25 mm (0.0098 in) long. The standard petal is broadly elliptic, 6.5–8 mm (0.26–0.31 in) long, 7–8 mm (0.28–0.31 in) wide, orange grading to dark red near the base and fading to yellow. The wings are 4.5–5.0 mm (0.18–0.20 in) long and red with a dark grey base, the keel 3.5–4.0 mm (0.14–0.16 in) long and dark red. Flowering mainly occurs in July and August and the fruit is a flattened triangular pod 10–12 mm (0.39–0.47 in) long.

== Taxonomy ==
Daviesia pteroclada was first formally described in 1995 by Michael Crisp in Australian Systematic Botany from specimens collected near Green Head by Charles Chapman in 1978. The specific epithet (pteroclada) means "winged shoot".

== Distribution and habitat ==
This daviesia grows in heathy woodland between Eneabba and Mount Lesueur in the Geraldton Sandplains biogeographic region of south-western Western Australia.

== Conservation status ==
Daviesia pteroclada is listed as "Priority Three" by the Government of Western Australia Department of Biodiversity, Conservation and Attractions, meaning that it is poorly known and known from only a few locations but is not under imminent threat.
