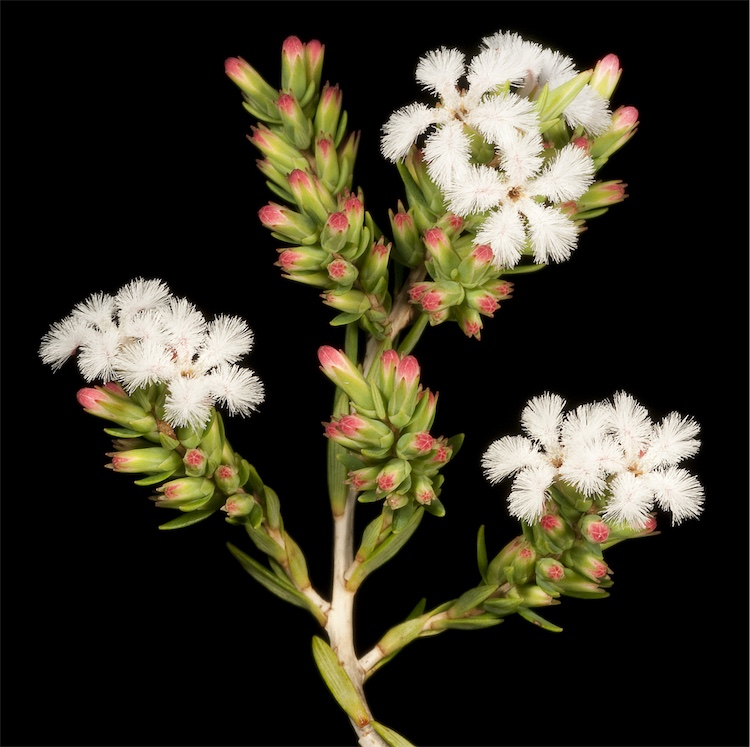
- Near Warradarge

Scientific classification
- Kingdom: Plantae
- Clade: Tracheophytes
- Clade: Angiosperms
- Clade: Eudicots
- Clade: Asterids
- Order: Ericales
- Family: Ericaceae
- Genus: Leucopogon
- Species: L. stenophyllus

Binomial name
- Leucopogon stenophyllus Hislop
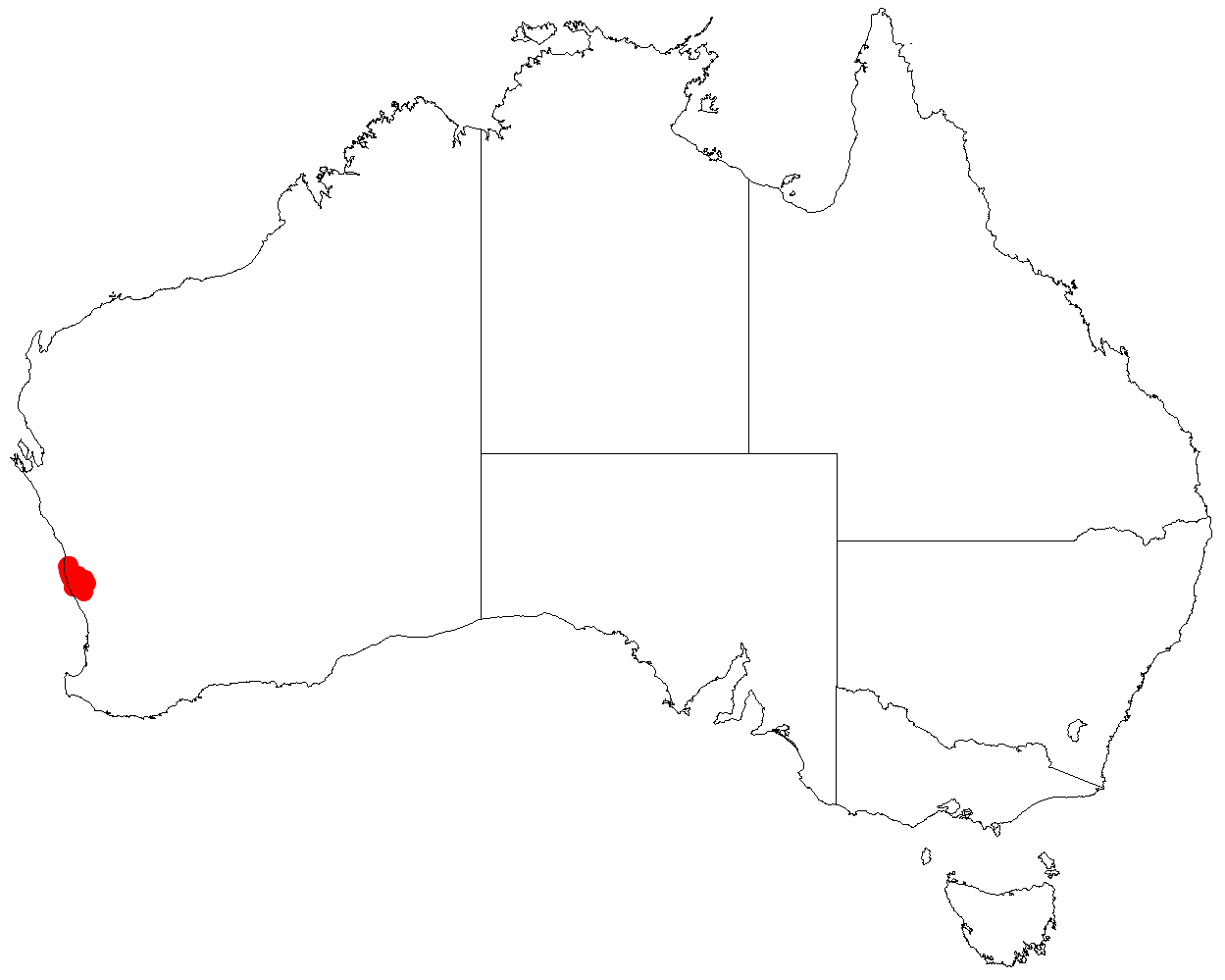
- Occurrence data from AVH

= Leucopogon stenophyllus =

Species of plant

Leucopogon stenophyllus is a species of flowering plant in the heath family Ericaceae and is endemic to the south-west of Western Australia. It is an erect, open shrub with a single stem at ground level, linear, narrowly egg-shaped or narrowly elliptic leaves and erect clusters of 3 to 17 white flowers on the ends of branches and short side-branches.

== Description ==
Leucopogon stenophyllus is an erect, open shrub that typically grows up to 90 cm (35 in) high and 70 cm (28 in) wide, and has a single stem at ground level, the young branchlets usually glabrous. The leaves are spirally arranged, linear, narrowly egg-shaped or narrowly elliptic, mostly 3–8 mm (0.12–0.31 in) long and 0.6–1.3 mm (0.024–0.051 in) wide and sessile or on petiole up to 0.5 mm (0.020 in) long. The edges of the leaves are usually turned down or rolled under, and both surfaces of the leaves are more or less glabrous. The flowers are arranged in groups of 3 to 17 on the ends of branches or on short side-branches, with narrowly egg-shaped or narrowly elliptic bracts and egg-shaped bracteoles 1.3–2.4 mm (0.051–0.094 in) long. The sepals are egg-shaped or narrowly egg-shaped, 2.3–3.6 mm (0.091–0.142 in) long, and the petals white and joined at the base to form a bell-shaped tube 1.3–2.1 mm (0.051–0.083 in) long and shorter than the sepals, the lobes 2.0–2.8 mm (0.079–0.110 in) long and densely bearded on the inner surface. Flowering occurs in many months and the fruit is a narrowly elliptic drupe 2.5–3.0 mm (0.098–0.118 in) long.

== Taxonomy and naming ==
Leucopogon stenophyllus was first formally described in 2016 by Michael Clyde Hislop in the journal Nuytsia from specimens collected in the Minyulo Nature Reserve near Cataby in 2007. The specific epithet (stenophyllus) means "narrow-leaved".

== Distribution and habitat ==
This leucopogon grows in heath and low woodland in shallow sand and occurs from Lake Indoon near Eneabba to near Cataby in the Geraldton Sandplains and Swan Coastal Plain bioregions of south-western Western Australia.

== Conservation status ==
Leucopogon stenophyllus is listed as "not threatened" by the Western Australian Government Department of Biodiversity, Conservation and Attractions.
