= Pimelea gilgiana =

Scientific classification
- Kingdom: Plantae
- Clade: Tracheophytes
- Clade: Angiosperms
- Clade: Eudicots
- Clade: Rosids
- Order: Malvales
- Family: Thymelaeaceae
- Genus: Pimelea
- Species: P. gilgiana

Binomial name
- Pimelea gilgiana E.Pritz

Species of shrub

Pimelea gilgiana is a species of flowering plant in the family Thymelaeaceae and is endemic to near-coastal areas of north-western Western Australia. It is a shrub with narrowly egg-shaped leaves and head-like clusters of white or pinkish, dioecious flowers.

== Description ==
Pimelea gilgiana is a shrub that typically grows to a height of 0.35–1.2 m (1 ft 2 in – 3 ft 11 in). The leaves are narrowly egg-shaped, often with the narrower end towards the base, 3–23 mm (0.12–0.91 in) long and 1.5–7 mm (0.059–0.276 in) wide on a short petiole. The flowers are arranged in heads, the female flowers white with reddish-green involucral bracts, the floral tube about 5.5 mm (0.22 in) long and the sepals about 1.5 mm (0.059 in) long. Male flowers are white or pinkish with green involucral bracts, the floral tube 6–7 mm (0.24–0.28 in) long and the sepals 2.0–3.2 mm (0.079–0.126 in) long. Flowering occurs from June to September.

== Taxonomy ==
Pimelea gilgiana was first formally described in 1904 by Ernst Georg Pritzel in Botanische Jahrbücher für Systematik, Pflanzengeschichte und Pflanzengeographie from specimens he collected near Champion Bay. The specific epithet (gilgiana) honours Ernest Friedrich Gilg.

== Distribution and habitat ==
This pimelea grows in sand pockets and rock crevices on coastal limestone outcrops in near-coastal areas south from Dirk Hartog Island to near Leeman in the Carnarvon, Geraldton Sandplains, Swan Coastal Plain and Yalgoo bioregions of Western Australia.

== Conservation status ==
Pimelea gilgiana is listed as "not threatened" by the Government of Western Australia Department of Biodiversity, Conservation and Attractions.
