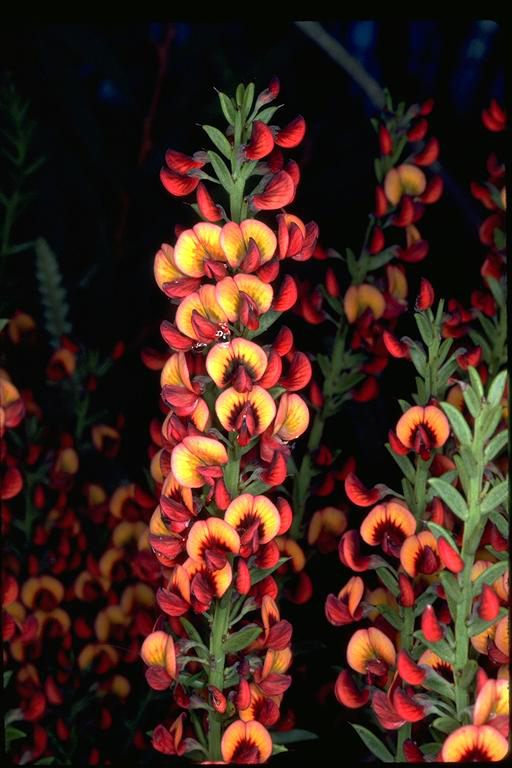
- At Gooseberry Hill

Scientific classification
- Kingdom: Plantae
- Clade: Tracheophytes
- Clade: Angiosperms
- Clade: Eudicots
- Clade: Rosids
- Order: Fabales
- Family: Fabaceae
- Subfamily: Faboideae
- Genus: Daviesia
- Species: D. polyphylla

Binomial name
- Daviesia polyphylla Benth. ex Lind.

= Daviesia polyphylla =

Species of flowering plant

Daviesia polyphylla is a species of flowering plant in the family Fabaceae and is endemic to the south-west of Western Australia. It is a bushy, spreading, glabrous shrub with narrowly egg-shaped or elliptic, sharply-pointed phyllodes and yellow and dark red flowers.

== Description ==
Daviesia polyphylla is a bushy, spreading, glabrous shrub that typically grows up to 0.6 m (2 ft 0 in) high and 1 m (3 ft 3 in) wide. It has rather crowded, vertically flattened, narrowly egg-shaped or elliptic phyllodes 5–20 mm (0.20–0.79 in) long and 1.5–2.5 mm (0.059–0.098 in) wide that diverge from the branchlets at angles of 45–90°. The flowers are usually arranged singly or in pairs in leaf axils on a peduncle up to 0.5 mm (0.020 in) long, each flower on a pedicel 1.0–2.5 mm (0.039–0.098 in) long with spatula-shaped bracts 0.5–1.0 mm (0.020–0.039 in) long at the base. The sepals are 2.0–2.5 mm (0.079–0.098 in) long with lobes about 0.5 mm (0.020 in) long. The standard petal is elliptic with a notched centre, 4.5–6 mm (0.18–0.24 in) long, 5–6 mm (0.20–0.24 in) wide, and yellow-orange with a dark red base and pink edge. The wings are 5.0–6.5 mm (0.20–0.26 in) long and deep pink, the keel 5.0–6.5 mm (0.20–0.26 in) long and deep pink. Flowering mainly occurs from July to September and the fruit is an inflated, sharply-pointed, triangular pod 9–13 mm (0.35–0.51 in) long.

== Taxonomy and naming ==
Daviesia polyphylla was first formally described in 1839 by John Lindley in his book A Sketch of the Vegetation of the Swan River Colony from an unpublished description by George Bentham. The specific epithet (polyphylla) means "many-leaved".

== Distribution and habitat ==
This daviesia grows in heath, mainly in near-coastal areas and on the Darling Range from near Green Head to Busselton in the Avon Wheatbelt, Geraldton Sandplains, Jarrah Forest and Swan Coastal Plain biogeographic regions of south-western Western Australia.

== Conservation status ==
Daviesia polyphylla is listed as "not threatened" by the Western Australian Government Department of Biodiversity, Conservation and Attractions.
