= Old North Road Stock Route =

Stock Route in Western Australia

The Old North Road Stock Route, also known as the Champion Bay Stock Route or North West Stock Route, is a historic stock route than ran from Star Swamp to Allanooka. It follows much of the Old North Road to Geraldton, which extends from Star Swamp, North Beach to Allanooka Swamp, which is 54 km south-east of Geraldton. The road contains sections of the route, including numerous wells, homesteads, bodies of water, resting points and bridges. The stock route is approximately 335 kilometers long.

It was used from the 1850s, and formally defined in a survey in 1889.This stock route is one of the oldest in the state, and was important in opening access to and sustaining the development of northern districts for pastoralism in the 1850s. It became the mainstay for the coastal areas, from Perth to Dongara, and was used mostly by travelers and drovers, but also by government officials, families, and the overland mailing service to Champion Bay.

There is the Old Stock Route Trail, a 102 km return drive trail that retraces a portion of the Stock Route.

== History ==
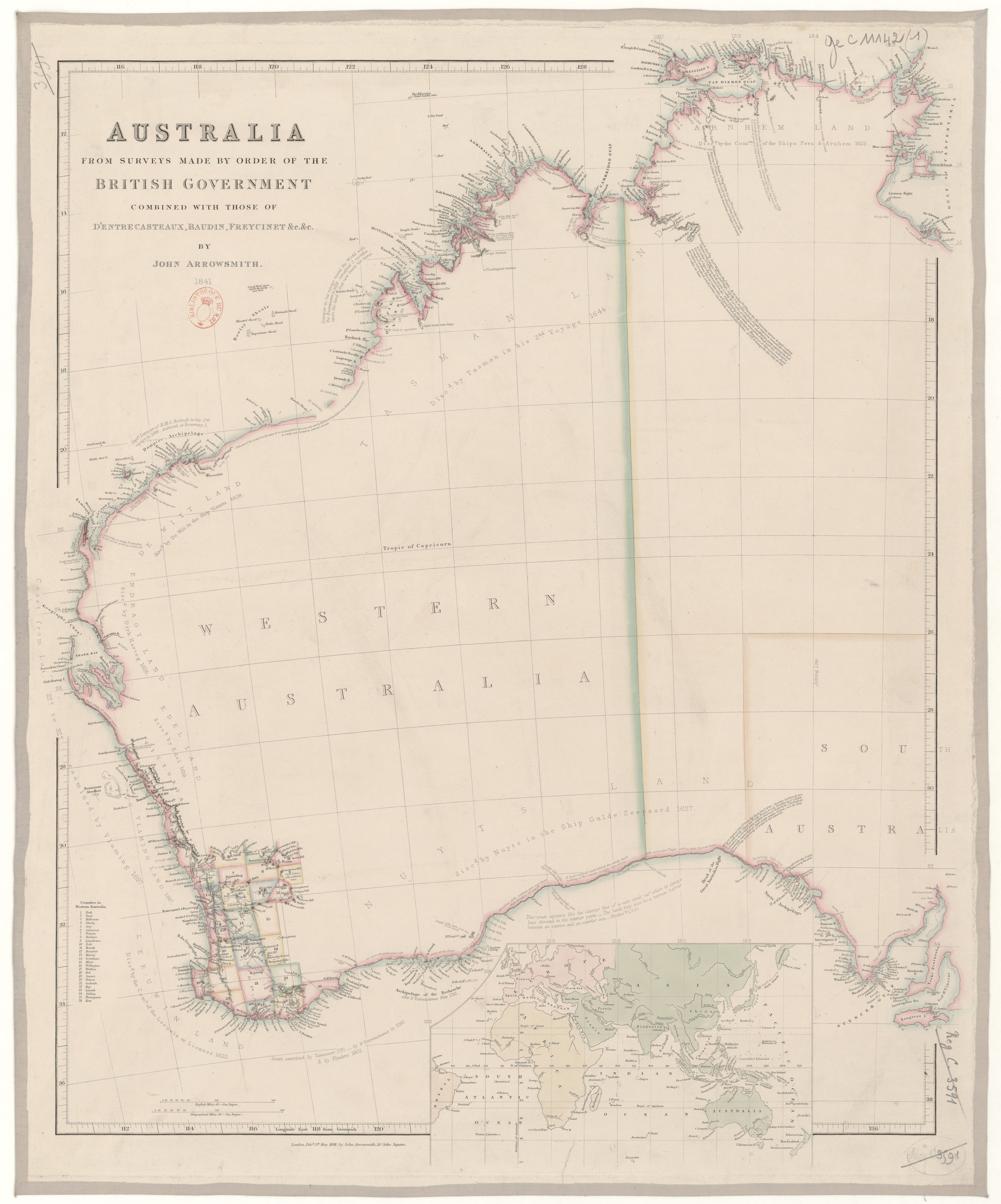
John Arrowsmith's 1841 map of Western Australia.

In 1839, twelve shipwrecked explorers, led by Lieutenant George Grey came into contact with the local Aborigines people. Grey, an army official of the 63rd Regiment, was encouraged to study the flora and fauna between Northwest Cape and Gantheaume Bay by the Royal Geographic Society. The party were dropped onto Bernier Island north of Shark Bay on the 25th of February. Gradually, they lost all their boats and equipment, forcing them to walk 550 km to Perth. They met a group of Aboriginal people, who assisted them and guided them through a series of pathways in the bush. Grey observed the huts and large populations in these places.

This route Grey took, and which was marked on cartographer John Arrowsmith’s 1841 map of south-west Australia, was to become the main of the road between Perth and Champion Bay.

In September of 1848, Assistant Surveyor Augustus Gregory led a settlers expedition as north as the Murchison River, aiming to find new grazing pasture, but also to watch for useful minerals, study the flora and fauna, as well as to observe the customs of the local Aboriginal people. 46 tons of equipment were sent north on Champion, the government schooner. Gregory and his aboriginal interpreter, Kardakai, moved overland with men, horses and carts. He was given explicit instructions by the Surveyor General to choose and blaze his own route northwards to Champion Bay, and also to pick the best road to the mine and a suitable boat harbour and road to it.

E. G. Hester was the first of Gregory's party to return, having returned alone on a more direct, easier route. This route approximated very closely to what would become the Old North Road Stock Route. A month later, Gregory took this route to Gingin, and described it as ‘better suited for a line of communication as regards water, grass and a freedom from rocky ground or dense scrubs than any of my former routes’. The road was formerly gazetted in June 1862 after continued developments and changes to its route.

In 1889 the Stock Route was formally surveyed and established, with water stops and reserves placed plentifully along the route for travelers.

Currently, sections of the route are considered designated stock route reserve, or reserve set aside for the protection of flora and fauna. Cowalla, Fatfield, Allanooka Inn and Junction Hotel have been restored and are now used as private residences. Natural parts such as Lake Logue, Stockman’s Gully Cave, Lake Indoon and Nambung Pools are tourist attractions along the Stock Route.

== See also ==
- Star Swamp
