= Waddy Forest, Western Australia =

Waddy Forest
- Town
- Coordinates: 29°51′51″S 116°9′58″E
- Country: Australia
- State: Western Australia
- LGA(s): Shire of Coorow

Government
  - State electorate(s): Moore
  - Federal division(s): Durack

Area
  - Total: 359.7 km^{2} (138.9 sq mi)

Population
  - Total(s): 30 (SAL 2021)
- Postcode: 6515

Waddy Forest is a town in the Mid West region of Western Australia.
