= Star Swamp =

Swamp on the Swan Coastal Plain

Coordinates: 31°51′12″S 115°45′47″E

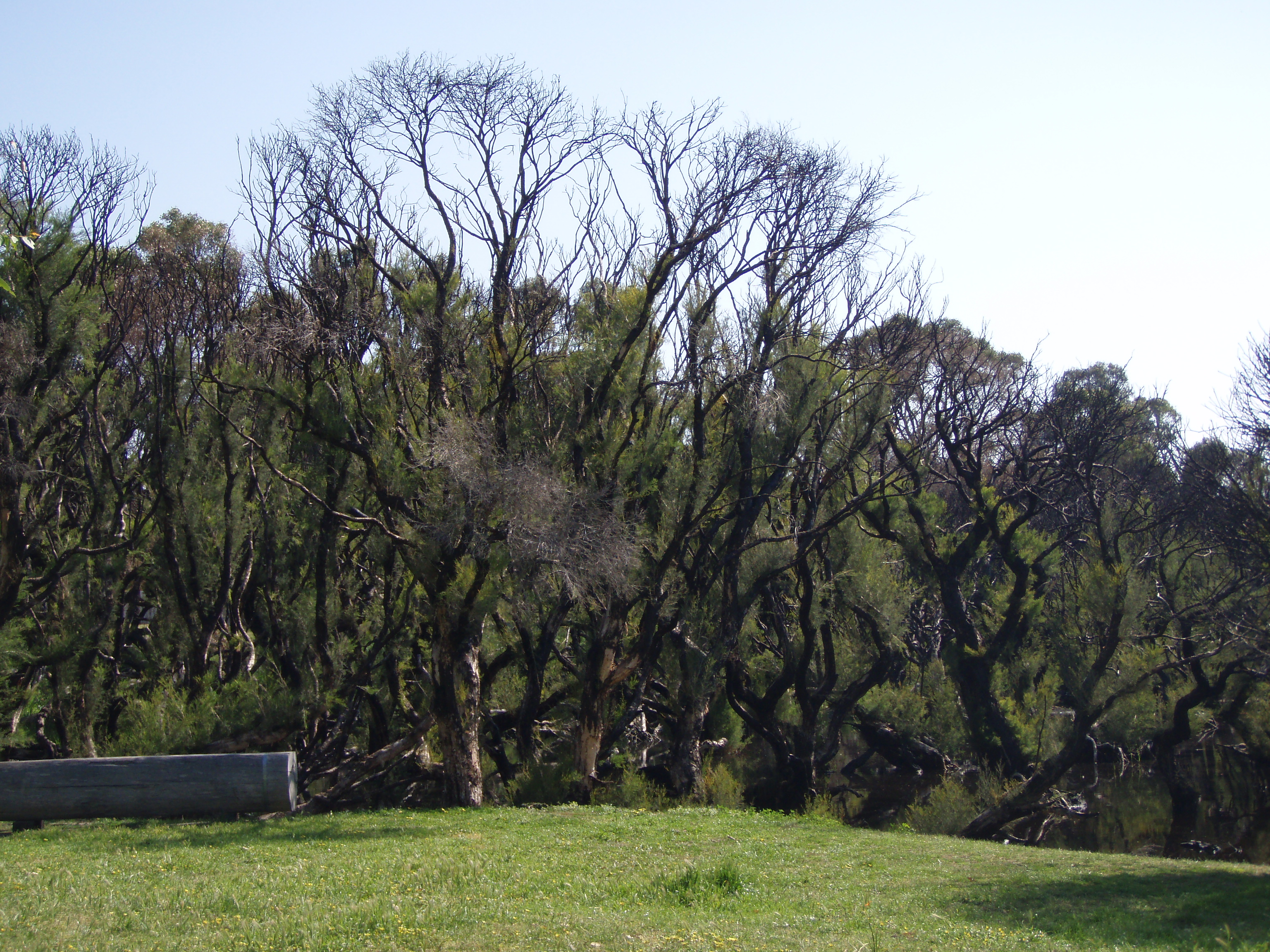
Star Swamp

Star Swamp Bushland Reserve is a bushland reserve occupying about half of the land area of the suburbs of Watermans Bay and North Beach in the northern suburbs of Perth, Western Australia. The precise origin of the name is unknown, but the earliest known use of the name was on a lease application by J.H.Okely of Wanneroo in 1868. In 1869 James Cowle, a surveyor, marked the unnamed wetland with an asterisk on his map. It is thought that this may have been an origin of the name, or because of a man named Bob Star who supposedly lived nearby.

In 1987, the State Government set aside 96 hectares (240 acres) as an A-class reserve, and funding from the Bicentennial Commemorative Program and assistance from local organisations facilitated the establishment of the Star Swamp Heritage Trail within the reserve.

Star Swamp contains a history trail that spans a 1.4 km (0.87 mi) walk. The trail contains ten points of interest, each marked with a plaque and sign.

Star Swamp has been the site of many bushfires. The most recent occurred on 21 March 2023 and burnt approximately 6.5 hectares of the 96 hectare A-class reserve. The fire was believed to be deliberately lit.

== History ==
Prior to European settlement Aboriginal people camped at Star Swamp during their seasonal treks.

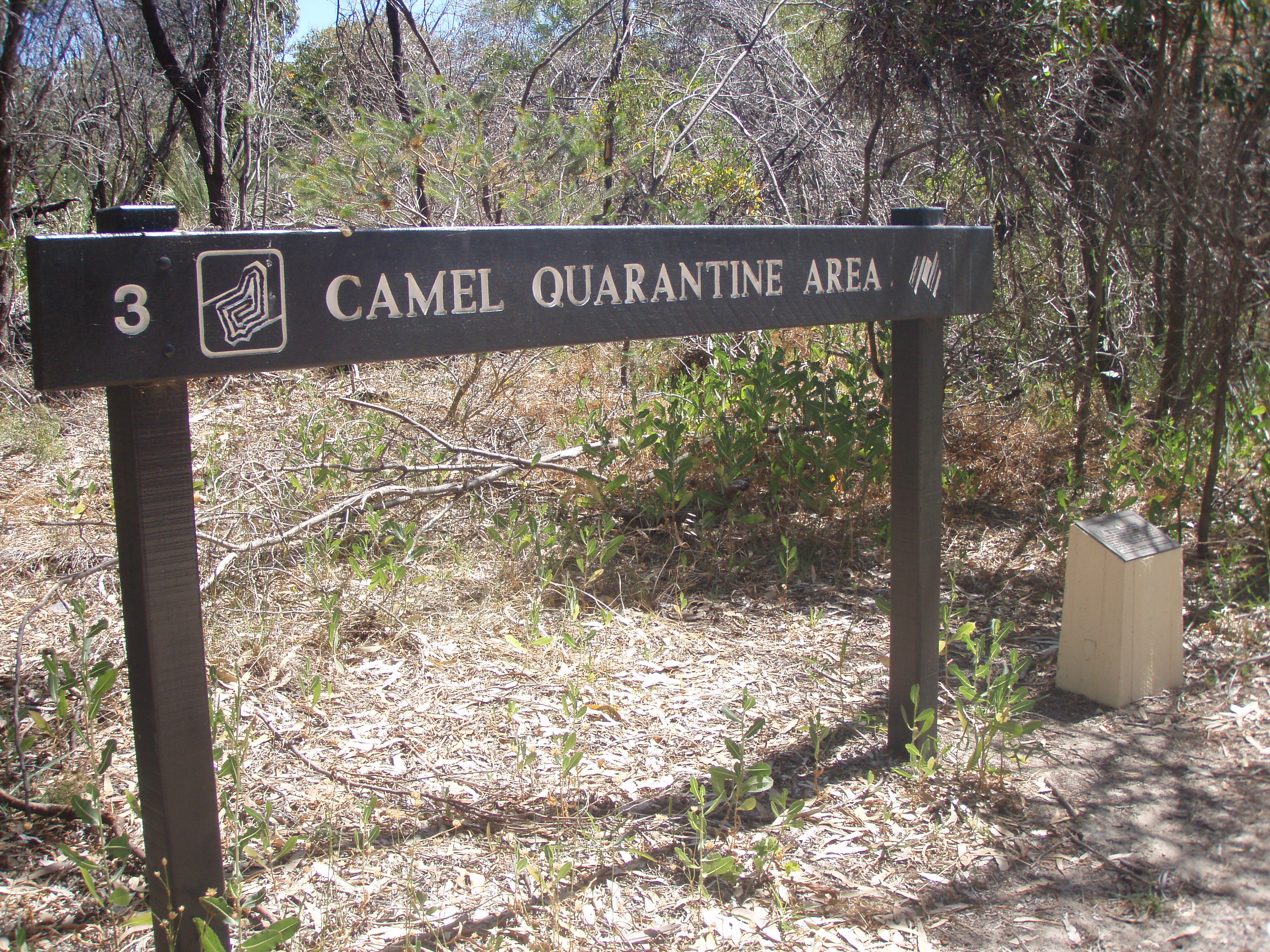
Camel Quarantine Area

Since 1868, the reserve was part of a 100-acre (40 ha) dairy and cattle lease, the Tillage Lease 5063, held by J. H. Okely. It was used as a camping area for drovers who used the Old North Road Stock Route, a route from Geraldton to Fremantle. During the gold rush of 1890, camels were imported in large numbers. Star Swamp was used in this period as a camel quarantine station.

In the early 20th century, the west of Star Swamp was divided for housing development. Marl, a coastal clay material, was extracted from the swamp for road building. During the Second World War, a squadron from the Australian Army 10th Light Horse Division was positioned nearby as a coastal watch, and used the swamp to water their horses.

In the 1970s, a campaign by the local residents prevented Star Swamp to be turned into housing land. The campaign lasted eight years.
