= Shire of Coorow =

Local government area in the Mid West region of Western Australia

Coordinates: 29°52′44″S 116°01′23″E

- Local government area
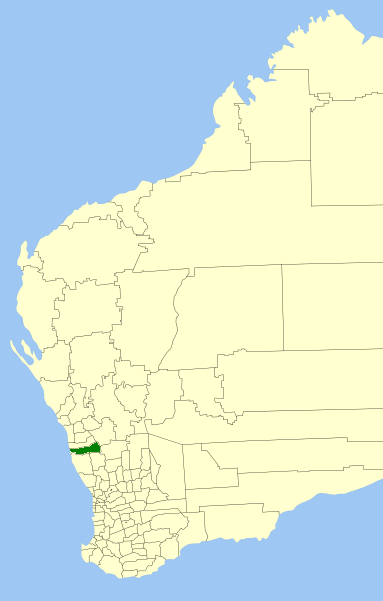
- Location in Western Australia

- Interactive map of Shire of Coorow
- Country: Australia
- State: Western Australia
- Region: Mid West
- Established: 1962
- Council seat: Coorow

Government
  - Shire President: Guy Sims
  - State electorate: Moore
  - Federal division: Durack

Area
  - Total: 4,193.9 km^{2} (1,619.3 sq mi)

Population
  - Total: 1,055 (LGA 2021)
- Website: Shire of Coorow
LGAs around Shire of Coorow
	Carnamah	Perenjori
Indian Ocean	Shire of Coorow	Dalwallinu
Dandaragan	Moora	Dalwallinu

The Shire of Coorow is a local government area located in the Mid West region of Western Australia, about 290 kilometres (180 mi) north of Perth, the state capital, and about 130 kilometres (80 mi) south of the city of Geraldton. The Shire covers an area of 4,194 square kilometres (1,619 sq mi) and its seat of government is the town of Coorow, with the largest settlement being Leeman.

== History ==
Historically, the area was part of the Carnamah Road District. On 19 April 1962, the Shire of Coorow was created.

== Wards ==
The Shire has eight councillors, elected at large. Wards were abolished in 2003.

== Towns and localities ==
The towns and localities of the Shire of Coorow with population and size figures based on the most recent Australian census:

Locality	Population	Area	Map
Coorow	179 (SAL 2021)	258.7 km^{2} (99.9 sq mi)	
Eganu	70 (SAL 2021)	1,387.5 km^{2} (535.7 sq mi)	
Green Head	293 (SAL 2021)	116 km^{2} (45 sq mi)	
Gunyidi	30 (SAL 2021)	401.9 km^{2} (155.2 sq mi)	
Leeman	351 (SAL 2021)	105 km^{2} (41 sq mi)	
Marchagee	45 (SAL 2021)	557.6 km^{2} (215.3 sq mi)	
Waddy Forest	30 (SAL 2021)	359.7 km^{2} (138.9 sq mi)	
Warradarge	66 (SAL 2021)	1,002 km^{2} (387 sq mi)	

== Population ==
Historical population

Year	Pop.	±% p.a.
1966	808	—
1971	912	+2.45%
1976	1,136	+4.49%
1981	1,253	+1.98%
1986	1,393	+2.14%
1991	1,526	+1.84%

Year	Pop.	±% p.a.
1996	1,389	−1.86%
2001	1,338	−0.75%
2006	1,199	−2.17%
2011	1,067	−2.31%
2016	1,036	−0.59%
2021	1,055	+0.36%

== Heritage-listed places ==
As of 2023, 76 places are heritage-listed in the Shire of Coorow, of which none are on the State Register of Heritage Places.
