= Coorow, Western Australia =

Coorow
- Town
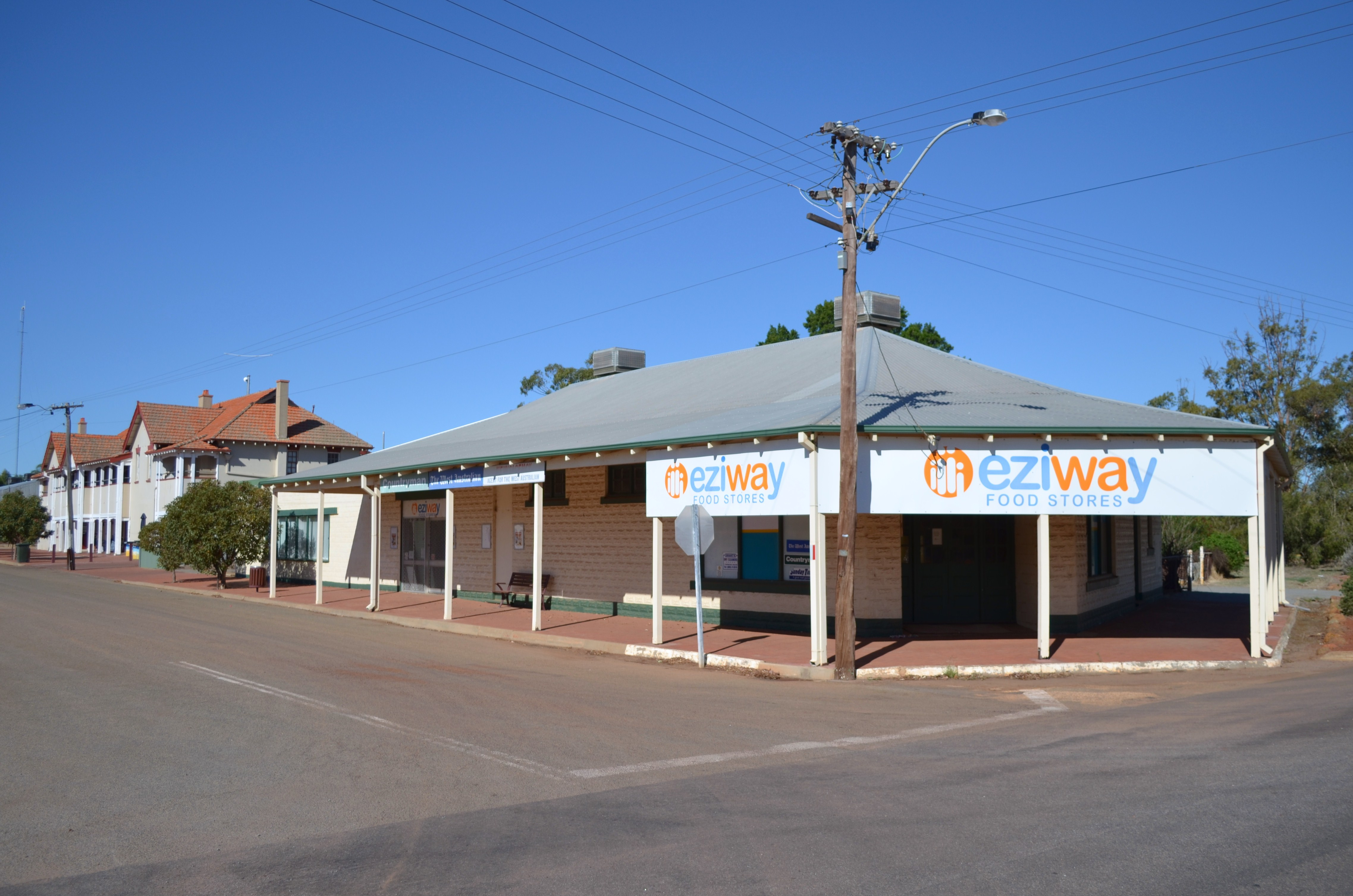
- Main Street, Coorow, 2013

- Interactive map of Coorow
- Coordinates: 29.88°S 116.02°E
- Country: Australia
- State: Western Australia
- LGA: Shire of Coorow
- Location: 266 km (165 mi) north of Perth; 25 km (16 mi) south east of Carnamah; 84 km (52 mi) north of Moora
- Established: 1893

Government
  - State electorate: Moore
  - Federal division: Durack

Area
  - Total: 258.7 km^{2} (99.9 sq mi)
- Elevation: 272 m (892 ft)

Population
  - Total: 179 (SAL 2021)
- Postcode: 6515

Coorow is a town in the Mid West region of Western Australia, 264 kilometres (164 mi) north of Perth.

== History ==
The townsite of Coorow was gazetted in 1893. Its name is derived from the Aboriginal name of a nearby spring, first recorded in 1872. The meaning of the name may be from the word "Curro", which is the Aboriginal word for a variety of Portulaca; another source gives it as "many mists".

The town experienced some flooding in 1918 following a deluge of 2.53 inches (64 mm) of rain overnight. The Moore River broke its banks and caused much more severe flooding downstream at Moora.

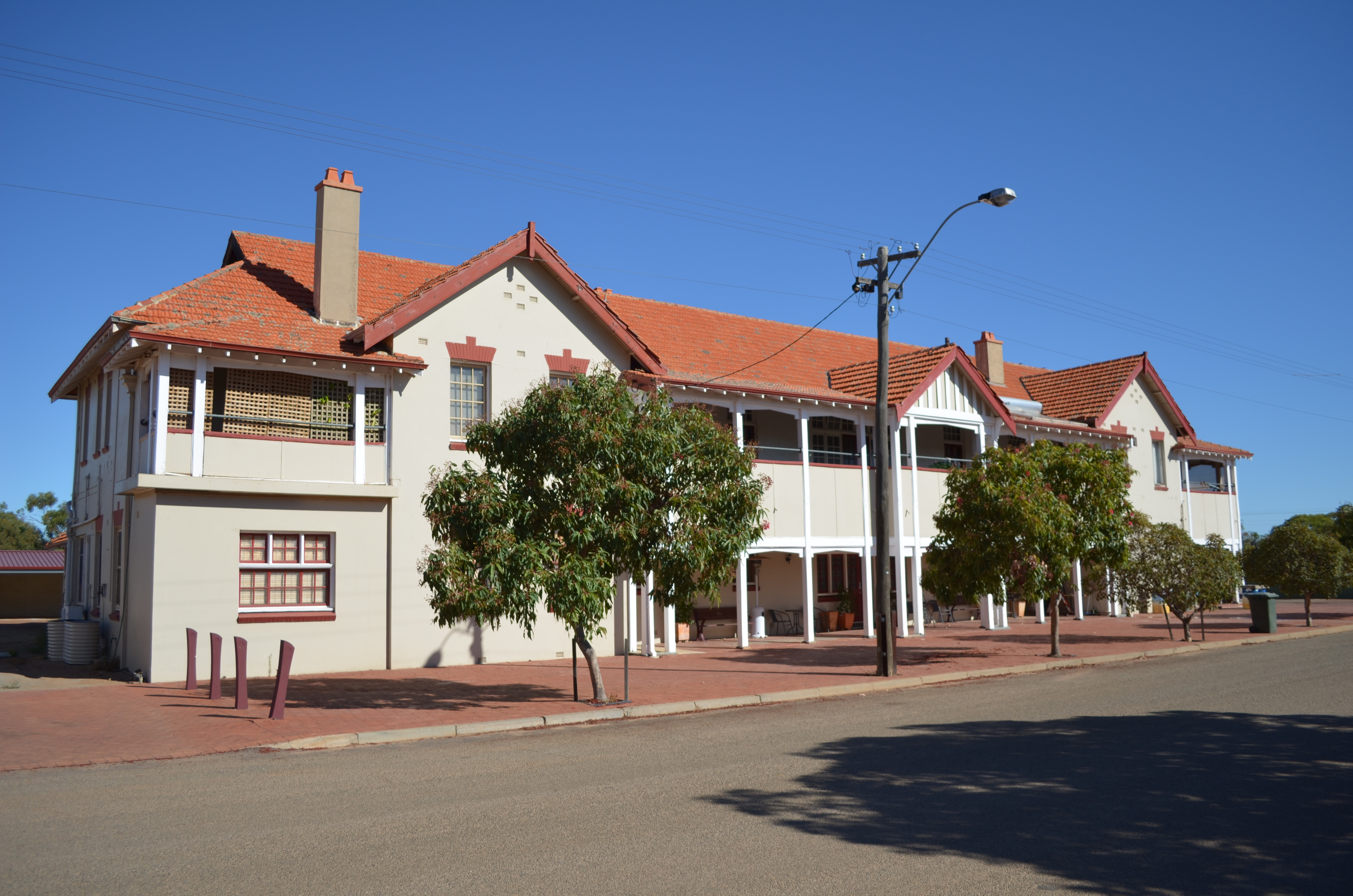
The Coorow Hotel, 2013

After rapid growth through the early 1920s local settlers began to seek obtaining a hotel licence for the town in 1927. The licence was granted in 1929 to Alexander Gloster who put forward a tender of £1,750, and submitted his plans for approval.

The hotel was erected at a cost of £13,000 and constructed of cement blocks and brick. The two storey building held fifteen rooms for accommodation on the top floor and more accommodation along with a kitchen, bar, commercial room, saloon and laundry on the ground floor. The building was sewered, with hot and cold water to all rooms, and had an electrical plant installed.

In 1932 the Wheat Pool of Western Australia announced that the town would have two grain elevators, each fitted with an engine, installed at the railway siding.

The town was flooded in 1932 following torrential rains in the area. The town was left under water for at least a day but the water flowed rapidly away down the Moore River. It was feared at one point that the town dam would burst from the pressure. Roads were cut from washaways and the streets and flooded buildings were left deep in mud with some stock losses, mostly sheep, being reported.
