= Leeman, Western Australia =

Leeman
- Town
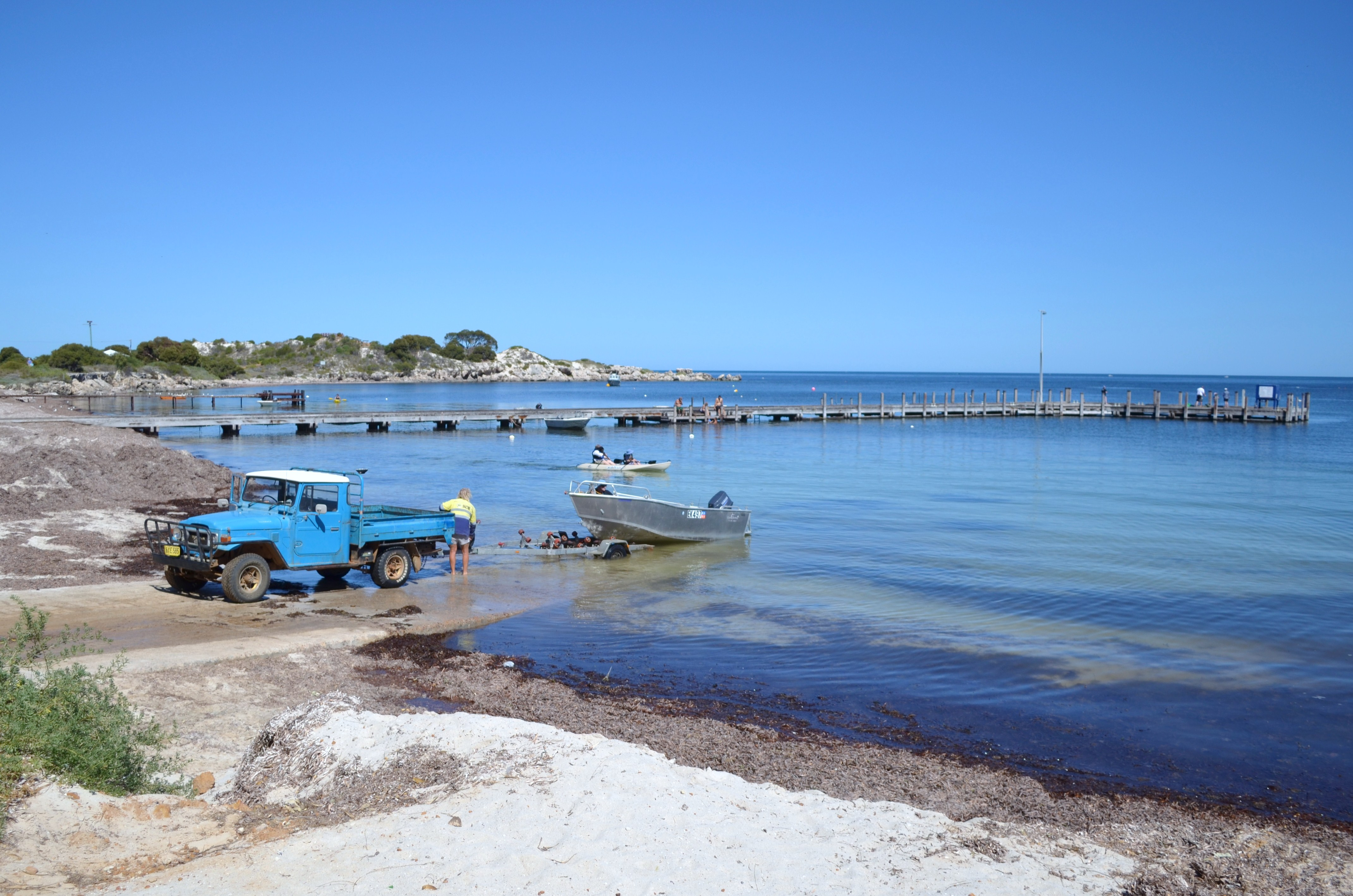
- Town jetty and boat ramp in 2013

- Interactive map of Leeman
- Coordinates: 29.95°S 114.98°E
- Country: Australia
- State: Western Australia
- LGA: Shire of Coorow
- Location: 300 km (190 mi) north of Perth; 77 km (48 mi) south of Dongara; 43 km (27 mi) north of Jurien Bay
- Established: 1961

Government
  - State electorate: Moore
  - Federal division: Durack

Area
  - Total: 105 km^{2} (41 sq mi)
- Elevation: 7 m (23 ft)

Population
  - Total: 351 (2021 census)
  - Density: 3.343/km^{2} (8.66/sq mi)
- Postcode: 6514

Leeman is a small coastal town in the Shire of Coorow in Western Australia.

Land was first surveyed and sub-divided in 1961 and the townsite was gazetted in 1961 as Snag Island, a name that is still in common use. Snag Island is a rocky island a small distance off-shore from the town.

The town was named after Abraham Leeman van Santwits, a Dutch sailor. He was second officer on the Dutch East India Company ship Vergulde Draeck (lit. 'Gilt Dragon') which was wrecked in April 1656 just south of Ledge Point, 107 kilometres (66 mi) north of Perth. Leeman was sent with a party of seven by captain Pieter Albertszoon to [Jakarta|Batavia]] for help; they arrived there in June 1656. In 1658 Leeman returned as first officer on board Waeckende Boei in search of the wreckage. He was in charge of the shore party that was abandoned when a storm blew in. Leeman and his crew then took a six-month open boat voyage to Batavia via Java.

In 1971 the Department of Education opened the Leeman Primary School, and the town adopted the new name.

Actress Mandy McElhinney grew up in a caravan park in Leeman. There is a Leeman Football Club.
