= Gunyidi, Western Australia =

Gunyidi
- Town
- Coordinates: 30°09′S 116°05′E
- Country: Australia
- State: Western Australia
- LGA: Shire of Coorow
- Location: 231 km (144 mi) N of Perth; 57 km (35 mi) W of Dalwallinu
- Established: 1930

Government
  - State electorate: Moore
  - Federal division: Durack

Area
  - Total: 401.9 km^{2} (155.2 sq mi)
- Elevation: 295 m (968 ft)

Population
  - Total: 30 (SAL 2021)
- Postcode: 6513

Gunyidi is a small town in the Shire of Coorow. The town is situated between Moora and Carnamah in the Mid West region of Western Australia.

The town was originally a siding along the Midland Railway and was initially known as Siberia Fettlers Camp, which was established in 1906. The name was soon changed to Gunnyidi. It was declared as a town in 1930 and the name was officially changed to the present spelling in 1973.

The name is Aboriginal in origin and is a shortened name for a nearby well Mungerdegunyidie.
