= Green Head, Western Australia =

Green Head
- Town
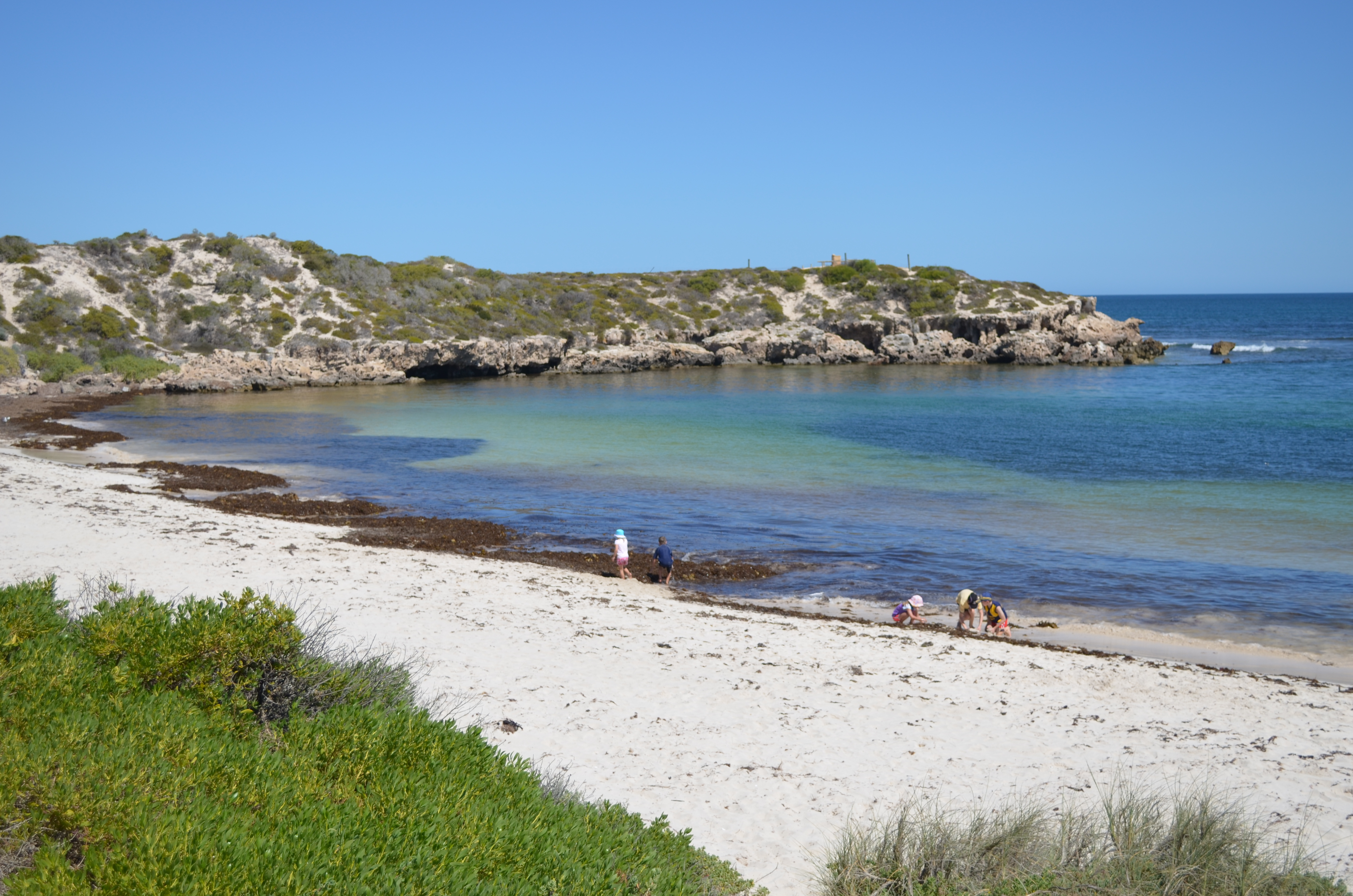
- Dynamite Bay, Green Head in 2013

- Coordinates: 30°03′S 114°58′E
- Country: Australia
- State: Western Australia
- LGA(s): Shire of Coorow
- Location: 288 km (179 mi) NNW of Perth; 15 km (9.3 mi) S of Leeman
- Established: 1966

Government
  - State electorate(s): Moore
  - Federal division(s): Durack

Area
  - Total: 116 km^{2} (45 sq mi)
- Elevation: 5 m (16 ft)

Population
  - Total(s): 293 (SAL 2021)
- Postcode: 6514

Green Head is a small Australian coastal town in the Shire of Coorow. The town is situated between Geraldton and Perth in the Mid West region of Western Australia along Indian Ocean Drive, with a small population of only 289 people. It is the home of what was a significant, but now declining, rock lobster industry.

== History ==
The first Europeans known to visit the Green Head coast were Dutch sailors in the 1600s, sailing to Indonesia for trade. Several Dutch ships were wrecked on the Western Australian reefs, among them Vergulde Draeck (lit. 'Gilt Dragon'). Abraham Leeman and crew from Waeckende Boey, while searching in the ship's small boat for survivors of Vergulde Draeck, were marooned on Fishermans Island just south of Green Head in 1658.

The town was named after the nearby headland, which was originally named in 1875 by Staff-Commander William Edwin Archdeacon, who was in charge of the Admiralty survey of the coast of Western Australia. The name is descriptive. Land was set aside for a camping reserve in 1946 and the popularity of the area led to a demand for building blocks in the 1950s. Lots were surveyed in 1959 and the townsite was gazetted on 7 January 1966.

== Tourism ==
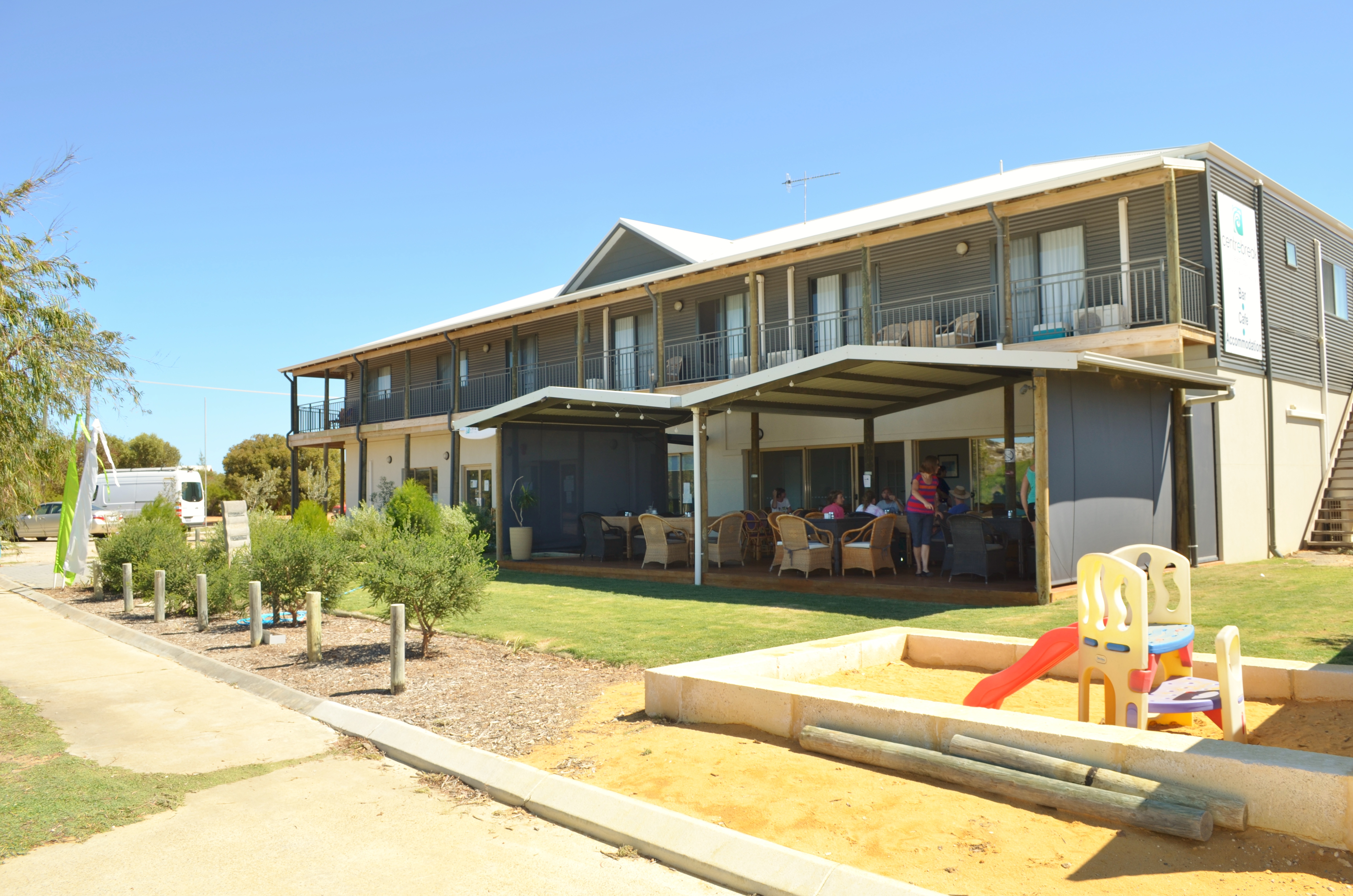
The CentreBreak Beach Stay

Green Head is a popular tourist destination with a number of accommodation choices. Local attractions include sea lions, which can be seen via a boat ride at Green Head coastline at North Fishermans Island. The island has the second largest sea lion colony on the Mid West Coast, with numbers fluctuating between 40 and 80. Tourists can interact with these mammals with a government licensed charter.

Green Head has numerous vantage points for beach fishing, where catches include whiting, herring, tailor, skippy, and cobbler. Two recreational boat ramps service the town, one near the jetty in Anchorage Bay and the other at South Bay for smaller boats. A boat provides access to a variety of fish as well as the local crayfish (rock-lobster).

Point Louise holds the main paddle-put surf break, which is suitable for all levels of experience. However, beginners are advised not to use this surf when the swell is over 2 metres (6 ft 7 in), due to the danger of large waves. Tourists can also explore off-shore reefs with the use of a boat.

Green Head is a well known sailboarding destination due to the strong sea breeze from December until February. Although popular amongst the windsurfing community it still remains relatively uncrowded. Sandboarding is another activity available with specific beaches to sandboard where sand erosion is not a problem.

The Green Head town site is surrounded by nature reserves and a national park. Lesueur National Park covers 2,700 hectares (6,700 acres) and is renowned for its diversity of wild flowers. 1200 species have been identified but not surprisingly there are still over 300 species to be identified. The Department of Environment and Conservation improved infrastructure by installing a bitumen loop road for access to the unique flora and fauna. The best period to see the wildflowers in bloom is from August through until October.

A 2.5-kilometre (1.6 mi) walk trail called 3 Bays Walkway interconnects the three main bays from South Bay at Cliff Park, to Dynamite Bay and continues on to Anchorage Bay in the north. This walk trail has large limestone rock lookouts at strategic viewing locations, numerous interpretive signage along the trail which depict cultural, historic and Aboriginal information of the area while also providing safe beach access. This walk trail is constructed predominantly of concrete to allow for greater usage regardless of age or abilities.

== Beaches ==
The warm Leeuwin Current from the north brings tropical sea life that swims with temperate species, creating a diverse diving environment offshore. Hard and soft corals, along with sponges, cover the numerous limestone reefs. Seagrass meadows and the absence of rivers flowing into the sea allows for very healthy conditions for marine life.

=== Dynamite Bay ===
Dynamite Bay is an almost circular bay in Green Head that is sheltered from the strong winds off the coast by a low lying rocky cliff that circles the beach. Snorkelling, swimming and wind-surfing are popular activities in the area.

=== South Bay ===
South Bay is a long white sand beach with clear turquoise water.

=== Point Louise ===
Point Louise, Green Head's main surf break, is also a good location for snorkeling with clear water is very clear and there is more than enough reef to explore it all. Further north are numerous bays ideal for snorkelling, kayaking, swimming and picnic areas with picnic tables.

A well maintained gravel road accesses the bays, which were once dominated by squatters' shacks, built since the 1950s. Shack removal in the Shire of Coorow in 1994 enabled development of the coastal drive and a series of recreational sites adjacent to Green Head.

=== Anchorage Bay ===
Anchorage Bay is between Dynamite Bay and Point Louise which also harbors the Anchorage Bay jetty, a former Department of Transport (Marine) service jetty and boat launch facility.
