= Warradarge, Western Australia =

Locality in Western Australia

Warradarge
- Town
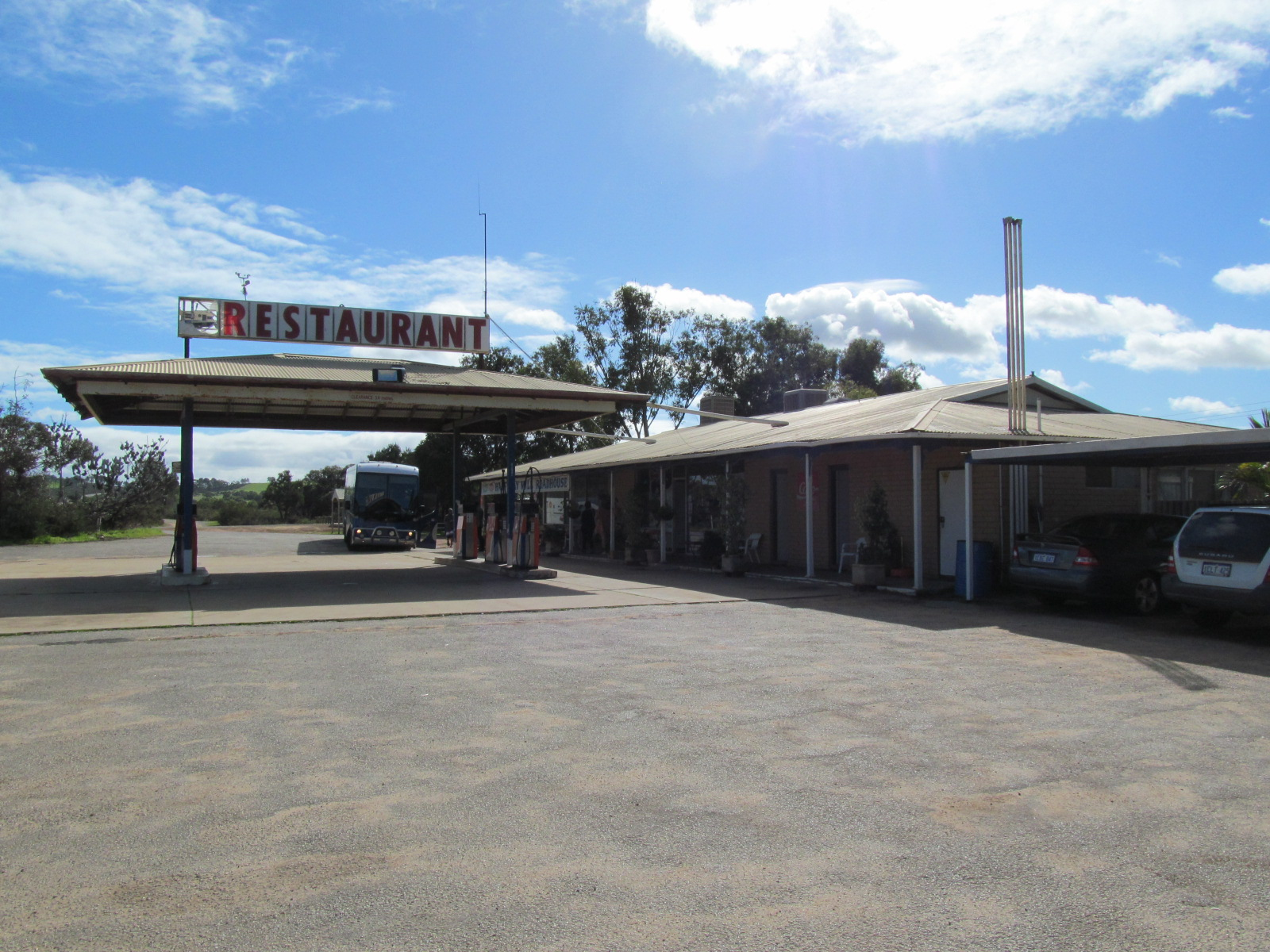
- Warradarge Roadhouse

- Coordinates: 30°4′12″S 115°18′29″E
- Country: Australia
- State: Western Australia
- LGA(s): Shire of Coorow

Government
  - State electorate(s): Moore
  - Federal division(s): Durack

Area
  - Total: 1,002 km^{2} (387 sq mi)

Population
  - Total(s): 66 (SAL 2021)
- Postcode: 6518

Warradarge is a locality in the Mid West region of Western Australia. Pronounced War-ra-darg-ee.
