= Silky oak (disambiguation) =

Silky oak is a common name for Grevillea robusta.

Silky oak may also refer to:

== Plants ==
Silky oak is the common name for certain trees and large shrubs in the family Proteaceae as well as their timber products, most notably Grevillea robusta. Others include:

- Alloxylon flammeum, red silky oak, Pink Silky Oak, Satin Silky Oak
- Alloxylon wickhamii , Pink Silky Oak, Satin Silky Oak
- Athertonia diversifolia, cream silky oak
- Austromuellera trinervia, Muellers silky oak
- Bleasdalea bleasdalei, blush silky oak
- Cardwellia, northern silky oak
- Carnarvonia araliifolia, Caledonian Silky Oak, red silky oak
- Darlingia darlingiana, rose silky oak, brown silky oak
- Darlingia ferruginea, rose silky oak, brown silky oak, Rusty Silky Oak
- Gevuina bleasdalei, wingleaf silky oak
- Grevillea banksii, red silky oak, dwarf silky oak
  - A white-flowered form, white silky oak
- Grevillea hilliana, white silky oak, Hill's silky oak
- Grevillea pteridifolia, Darwin silky oak, ferny-leaved silky oak
- Helicia australasica, Austral Silky Oak, creek silky oak
- Helicia blakei, Blake's Silky Oak
- Helicia grayi, Lamington's Silky Oak
- Helicia nortoniana, Norton’s Silky Oak
- Hicksbeachia pinnatifolia, ivory silky oak
- Hollandia sayeriana, Sayer’s Silky Oak
- Musgravea heterophylla, briar silky oak
- Oreocallis wickhamii, red silky oak
- Orites excelsus, mountain silky oak
- Stenocarpus sinuatus, white silky oak
- Stenocarpus salignus, red silky oak

== Places ==
- Silky Oak, Queensland, a locality in the Cassowary Coast Region, Queensland, Australia
