= White silky oak =

White silky oak is a common name for several plants and may refer to:

- Grevillea banksii (white-flowered form)
- Grevillea hilliana, endemic to Australia
- Stenocarpus sinuatus, native to Australia

== See also ==
- Silky oak (disambiguation)
