= Helicia lewisensis =

Conservation status
- Vulnerable (NCA)

Scientific classification
- Kingdom: Plantae
- Clade: Tracheophytes
- Clade: Angiosperms
- Clade: Eudicots
- Order: Proteales
- Family: Proteaceae
- Genus: Helicia
- Species: H. lewisensis

Binomial name
- Helicia lewisensis Foreman

Species of tree from Queensland, Australia

Helicia lewisensis is a species of rainforest trees, of northeastern Queensland, Australia, from the flowering plant family Proteaceae. It is endemic to the northern upland rainforests of the Wet Tropics region, from about 900 to 1,330 m (2,950 to 4,360 ft) altitude.

As of December 2013 this species has the official, current, Qld government conservation status of "vulnerable" species.

They have been recorded growing up to about 15 m (50 ft) tall.
