= Helicia recurva =

Conservation status
- Near Threatened (NCA)

Scientific classification
- Kingdom: Plantae
- Clade: Tracheophytes
- Clade: Angiosperms
- Clade: Eudicots
- Order: Proteales
- Family: Proteaceae
- Genus: Helicia
- Species: H. recurva

Binomial name
- Helicia recurva Foreman

Species of tree from Queensland, Australia

Helicia recurva is a species of rainforest trees, of northeastern Queensland, Australia, from the flowering plant family Proteaceae.

They are endemic to the upland rainforests of the Wet Tropics region, from about 500 to 1,300 m (1,600 to 4,300 ft) altitude.

As of December 2013 this species has the official, current, Qld government conservation status of "near threatened" species.

They have been recorded growing up to about 10 m (33 ft) tall.
