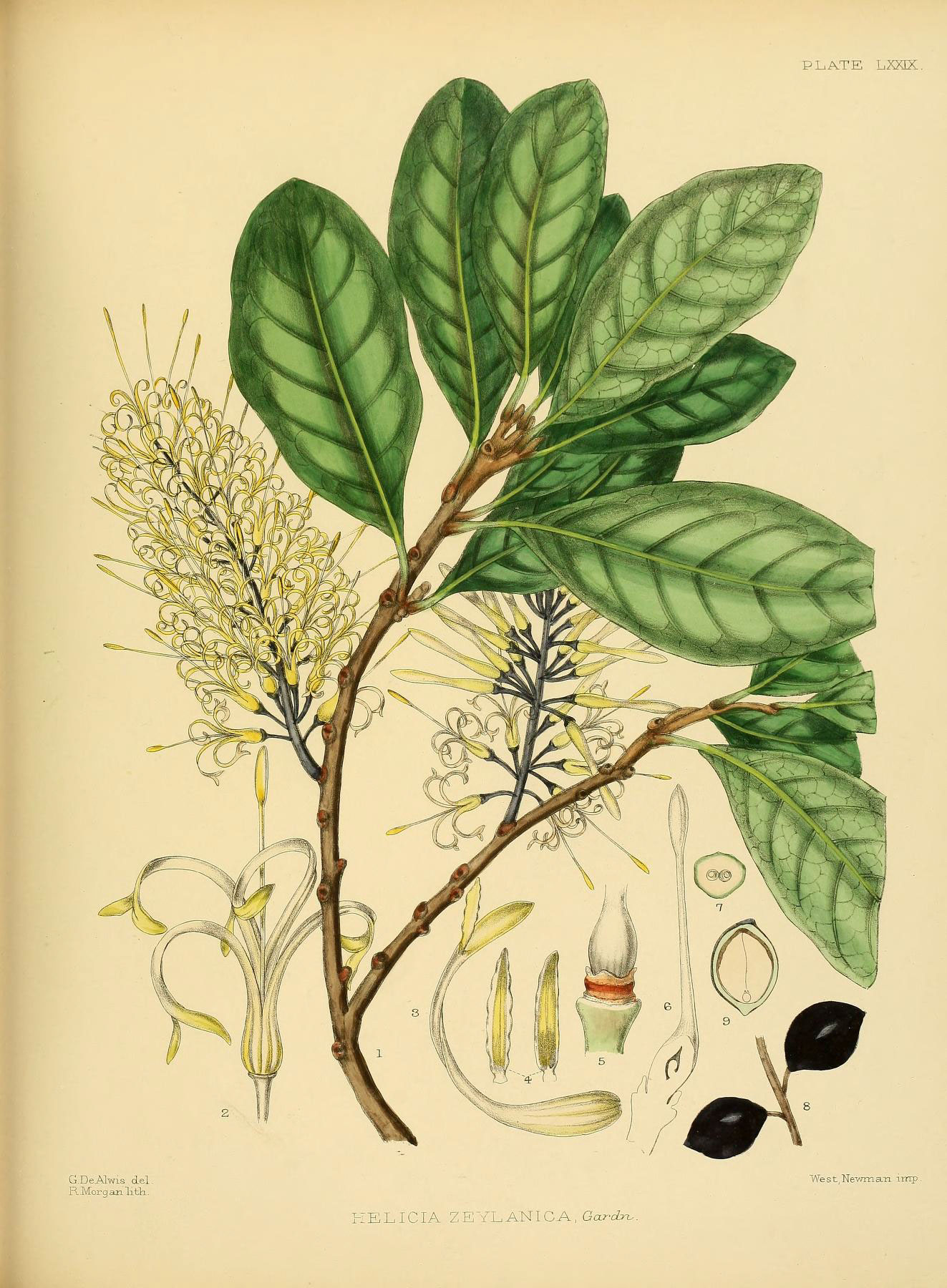
- Helicia ceylanica

Scientific classification
- Kingdom: Plantae
- Clade: Tracheophytes
- Clade: Angiosperms
- Clade: Eudicots
- Order: Proteales
- Family: Proteaceae
- Subfamily: Grevilleoideae
- Tribe: Roupaleae
- Subtribe: Heliciinae
- Genus: Helicia; Lour.

Type species
- Helicia cochinchinensis Lour.

Species
- see text

Synonyms
- Castronia Noronha; Cyanocarpus F.M.Bailey; Helittophyllum Blume

= Helicia =

Genus of plants

Helicia is a genus of trees and shrubs, constituting part of the plant family Proteaceae. They grow naturally in tropical forests throughout South and Southeast Asia, including India, Sri Lanka, Indochina, Peninsular Malaysia to New Guinea and as far south as New South Wales.

== Conservation ==
Many Helicia species are threatened to various degrees, as officially recognised by the International Union for Conservation of Nature (IUCN) and by continental, national and local governments. Seventeen species have official IUCN global conservation statuses of either critically endangered, endangered, vulnerable or near threatened (see Species list for details).

== Naming and classification ==
In 1790, notable pioneer botanist João de Loureiro described this genus as Helicia in his publication Flora Cochinchinensis. The type species for the genus was Helicia cochinchinensis, the type specimen of which was collected in Cochinchina, Vietnam. The genus name derives from the Greek word "έλιξ" (élix), which refers to the petals, now called tepals, spirally revolving or simply rolling or coiling up on themselves, at anthesis (the flowering time when the anthers open).

In 1831, botanist Nathaniel Wallich named Helicia robusta for a dried specimen of a cultivated plant in India, based on the specimen's earlier 1814 name Roupala robusta by William Roxburgh. Roxburgh's Calcutta botanic gardens cultivated the plant.

From the 1850s to the 1860s notable German–Australian botanist Ferdinand von Mueller formally described several new Australian species. In the late 1800s and early 1900s Frederick M. Bailey concentrated further on additional Queensland species, writing descriptions of them in numerous scientific papers.

In 1939, Hermann O. Sleumer described many additional Malesian species, especially in New Guinea. In 1955, he published a revision of the genus. In 1956, his treatment of the genus in Flora Malesiana was published. From 1969 to the late 1990s botanist Don B. Foreman, who was based in Papua New Guinea and Australia, collected numerous additional species, which he formally described before he wrote the comprehensive reviews and flora treatments for the two regions; notably in the authoritative Handbooks of the Flora of Papua New Guinea (1978–1995, to date 3 volumes), he wrote the chapters for Proteaceae and other families; and in the authoritative Flora of Australia (1981–, 60 volume series) he wrote the treatment of Helicia.

From the 1990s botanist Richard C. K. Chung, based in Malaysia, published new species formal descriptions and a revision of the 13 species occurring in Borneo. In total, approximately 100 species have been formally scientifically described.

Lawrie Johnson and Barbara G. Briggs grouped Helicia with Xylomelum in the subtribe Heliciinae, tribe Helicieae, and subfamily Grevilleoideae in their 1975 monograph "On the Proteaceae: the evolution and classification of a southern family". However, genetics studies showed these two to be relatively unrelated, instead finding the closest genetic correlations between Hollandaea and Helicia, and therefore classifying them both in the subtribe Heliciinae within the tribe Roupaleae.

== Diversity and description ==
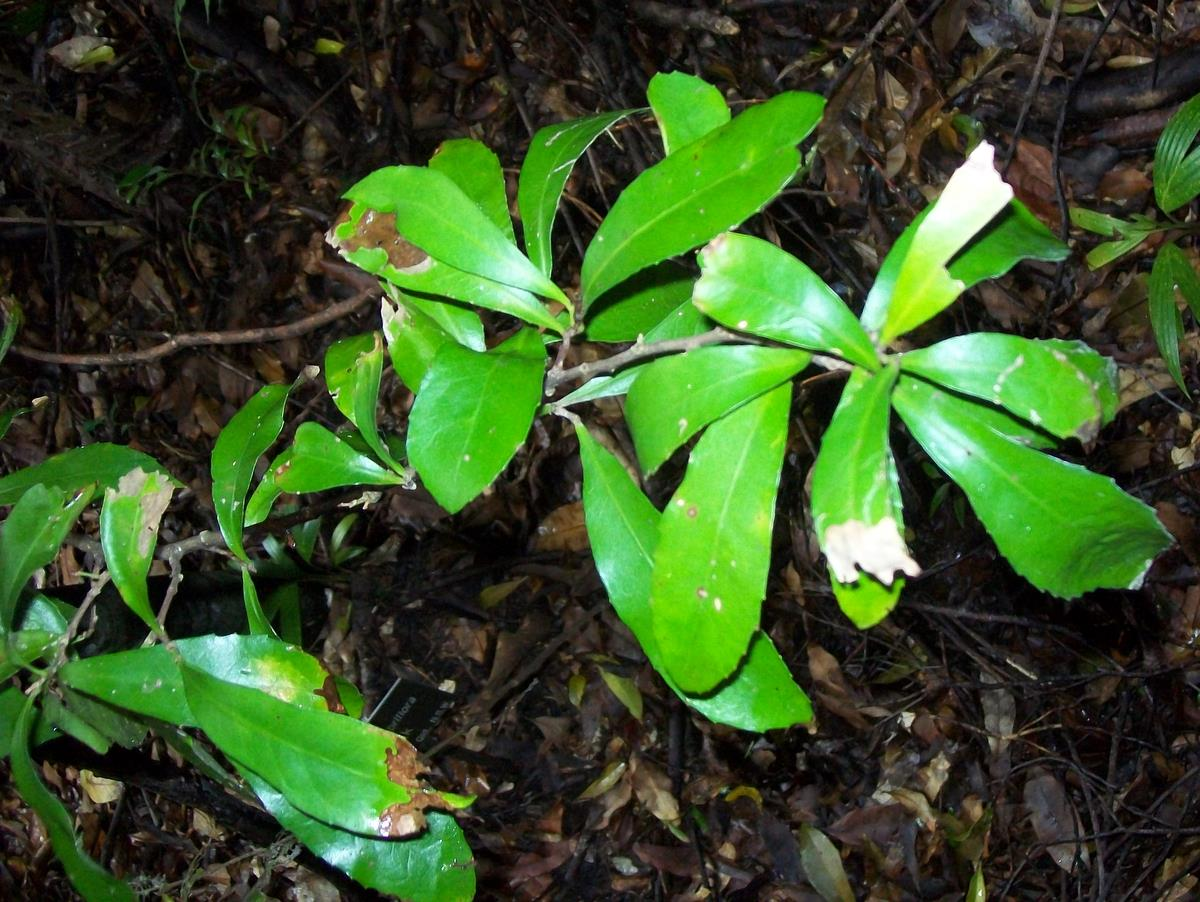
Helicia glabriflora from New South Wales, Australia

Helicia plants generally grow naturally as small trees, while some species grow as shrubs and some grow to medium-sized trees up to 30 m (100 ft).

They grow naturally across Indochina and Malesia with a major centre of species diversity of about fifty species in New Guinea. They grow naturally in the south west Pacific ocean region, and in north and eastern Australia. They grow naturally across southern and eastern Asia, including Indonesia, Malaysia and another centre of species diversity of about twenty species in southern China, extending to parts of the Indian subcontinent, the Philippines, Taiwan, and southern Japan. The plant family Proteaceae's 1,700 species (approximate) have their greatest diversity in the southern hemisphere and smaller centres of diversity including some Helicia, in the near northern hemisphere. The species diversity of the plant family Proteaceae decreases further northwards. H. cochinchinensis has the natural distribution reaching furthest north to Japan where it grows into trees in the mountains of warmer parts and where no other species nor other Proteaceae genera occur. The same Japanese name for this species, Yama-mogashi (山もがし), also means the whole genus and the entire Proteaceae plant family. In the New Guinea and southern China centres of species diversity, many species grow in forests, up to as tall as the sub-canopy, especially diverse in rainforests. In Australia, they are generally components of rainforests, and prefer richer soils, especially in the farthest south region of Helicia's global distribution, the Illawarra, New South Wales, south of Sydney, where only one species H. glabriflora occurs, preferring richer basalt soils.

== Cultivation ==
In India and east Asia, Helicias have been cultivated in botanic gardens, from the 1800s. In Australia they have rarely been cultivated, and were thought to have little horticultural value. The rusty-coloured new growth is attractive on some species. In some of the better known Australian species, the flowers and fruit are generally not prominent, and plants can be slow growing. They are generally propagated by seed, the viability of which drops rapidly with time.

== Species ==
As of October 2026, Plants of the World Online accepts the following 113 species:

- Helicia acutifolia Sleumer – vulnerable
- Helicia affinis Sleumer
- Helicia albiflora Sleumer – near threatened
- Helicia amplifolia Sleumer – near threatened
- Helicia archboldiana Sleumer
- Helicia arguta Sleumer
- Helicia attenuata (Jack) Blume
- Helicia australasica F.Muell. – vulnerable
- Helicia biformis Sleumer
- Helicia blakei Foreman
- Helicia bullata Sleumer
- Helicia calocoma Foreman – vulnerable
- Helicia cameronii F.Muell.
- Helicia carrii Sleumer
- Helicia cauliflora Merr.
- Helicia celata Foreman
- Helicia celebica Sleumer
- Helicia ceylanica Gardner
- Helicia clemensiae Sleumer
- Helicia clivicola W.W.Sm.
- Helicia cochinchinensis Lour.
- Helicia coeruleopurpurea P.Royen
- Helicia commutata Sleumer
- Helicia danlagunzadii Malabrigo, Eduarte, A.G.Umali, A.B.Tobias & Navidad
- Helicia dentellata Sleumer
- Helicia dongxingensis H.S.Kiu
- Helicia elephanti Sleumer
- Helicia excelsa (Roxb.) Blume
- Helicia falcata C.Y.Wu
- Helicia ferruginea F.Muell.
- Helicia finisterrae Lauterb.
- Helicia forbesiana F.Muell.
- Helicia formosana Hemsl.
- Helicia fragilis Foreman
- Helicia fuscotomentosa Suess.
- Helicia glabrescens C.T.White
- Helicia glabriflora F.Muell.
- Helicia graciliflora Merr.
- Helicia grandifolia Lecomte – vulnerable
- Helicia grandis Hemsl.
- Helicia grayi Foreman
- Helicia hainanensis Hayata
- Helicia hypoglauca Diels
- Helicia insculpta Sleumer
- Helicia insularis Foreman – endangered
- Helicia kjellbergii Sleumer
- Helicia kwangtungensis W.T.Wang
- Helicia laiagamensis Foreman
- Helicia lamingtoniana (F.M.Bailey) C.T.White ex L.S.Sm.
- Helicia latifolia C.T.White – near threatened
- Helicia lauterbachiana Sleumer
- Helicia ledermannii Diels
- Helicia lewisensis Foreman
- Helicia longespicata Sleumer
- Helicia longipetiolata Merr. & Chun
- Helicia loranthoides C.Presl
- Helicia macrostachya Lauterb.
- Helicia maxwelliana Gibbs
- Helicia microcarpa Sleumer
- Helicia microneura C.T.White
- Helicia microphylla Diels
- Helicia moluccana (R.Br.) Blume
- Helicia neglecta Diels ex Sleumer – endangered
- Helicia nilagirica Bedd.
- Helicia nortoniana F.M.Bailey
- Helicia obovatifolia Merr. & Chun
- Helicia obtusata Sleumer
- Helicia odorata Diels
- Helicia olivacea Sleumer
- Helicia oreadum Diels
- Helicia pallescens Diels
- Helicia paucinervia Merr.
- Helicia peekelii Lauterb. – vulnerable
- Helicia peltata C.T.White – critically endangered
- Helicia petelotii Merr.
- Helicia petiolaris Benn.
- Helicia platyphylla Sleumer
- Helicia polyosmoides Foreman – critically endangered
- Helicia pterygota Sleumer
- Helicia purpurascens Sleumer
- Helicia pyrrhobotrya Kurz
- Helicia recurva Foreman
- Helicia rengetiensis Masam.
- Helicia reticulata W.T.Wang
- Helicia retivenia Sleumer
- Helicia retusa Foreman – vulnerable
- Helicia rigidiflora Sleumer
- Helicia robusta (Roxb.) R.Br. ex Blume
- Helicia rostrata Foreman – vulnerable
- Helicia rufescens Prain
- Helicia saruwagedica Sleumer
- Helicia saurauioides Sleumer
- Helicia schlechteri Lauterb.
- Helicia sellae-montis Sleumer
- Helicia serrata (R.Br.) Blume
- Helicia sessilifolia R.C.K.Chung
- Helicia shweliensis W.W.Sm. – endangered
- Helicia silvicola W.W.Sm.
- Helicia sleumeri Foreman
- Helicia stelechantha Diels
- Helicia stenophylla Merr.
- Helicia subcordata Foreman – endangered
- Helicia symplocoides R.C.K.Chung – vulnerable
- Helicia teysmanniana Sleumer
- Helicia tibetensis H.S.Kiu
- Helicia torricellensis Lauterb.
- Helicia tsaii W.T.Wang
- Helicia uganensis Diels ex Sleumer
- Helicia vanroyenii Foreman
- Helicia versteeghii Foreman
- Helicia vestita W.W.Sm.
- Helicia wollastonii Ridl.
- Helicia woxvoldiana W.N.Takeuchi
- Helicia yangchunensis H.S.Kiu
- Helicia yingtzulinia S.S.Ying
