= H. neglecta =

H. neglecta may refer to:

- Helicia neglecta, a plant species endemic to Papua New Guinea
- Hydrobia neglecta, a small brackish water snail species found in Europe

== See also ==
- Neglecta (disambiguation)
