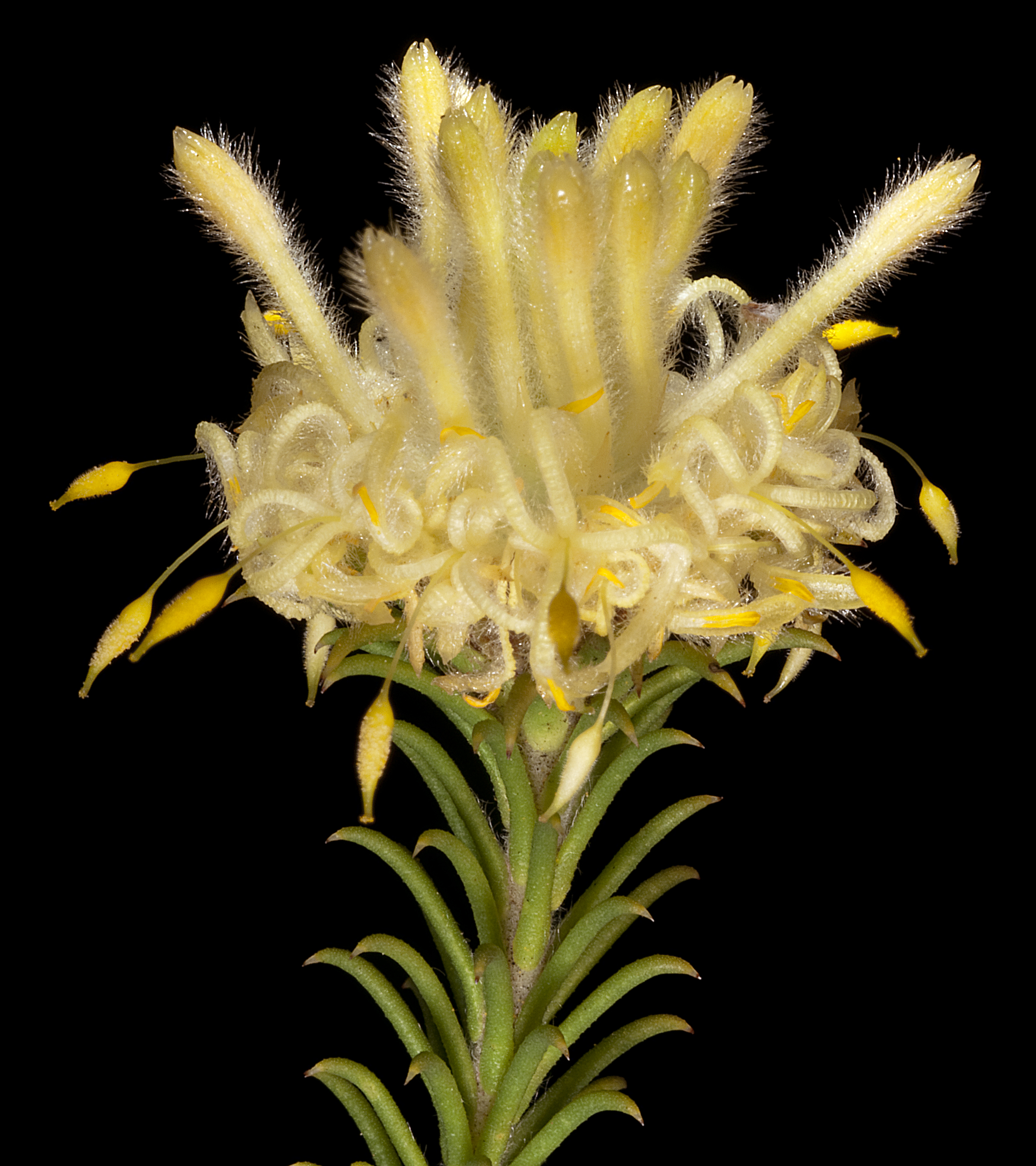

Scientific classification
- Kingdom: Plantae
- Clade: Tracheophytes
- Clade: Angiosperms
- Clade: Eudicots
- Order: Proteales
- Family: Proteaceae
- Genus: Petrophile
- Species: P. recurva

Binomial name
- Petrophile recurva Foreman

= Petrophile recurva =

Species of shrub endemic to Western Australia

Petrophile recurva is a species of flowering plant in the family Proteaceae and is endemic to south-western Western Australia. It is an erect, many-branched shrub with needle-shaped, sharply-pointed leaves, and spherical heads of hairy pale yellow or cream-coloured flowers.

== Description ==
Petrophile recurva is an erect, many-branched shrub that typically grows to a height of 0.8–1.5 m (2 ft 7 in – 4 ft 11 in) and has hairy young branchlets that become glabrous as they age. The leaves are needle-shaped, sharply-pointed, 6–9 mm (0.24–0.35 in) long 0.4–0.7 mm (0.016–0.028 in) wide. The flowers are arranged near the ends of branchlets in spherical heads 14–20 mm (0.55–0.79 in) in diameter, with erect, lance-shaped involucral bracts at the base. The flowers are 9–12 mm (0.35–0.47 in) long, pale yellow to cream-coloured, and hairy. Flowering mainly occurs from July to October and the fruit is a nut, fused with others in an oval or spherical head 10–15 mm (0.39–0.59 in) in diameter.

== Taxonomy ==
Petrophile recurva was first formally described in 1995 by Donald Bruce Foreman in Flora of Australia from material collected by Marie Elizabeth Phillips between Moora and Jurien Bay in 1962. The specific epithet (recurva) means "curved or bent backwards", referring to the leaves.

== Distribution and habitat ==
This petrophile grows in heath, shrubland and woodland, often with Banksia species, between Warradarge, Watheroo and Wannamal in the Avon Wheatbelt, Geraldton Sandplains and Swan Coastal Plain biogeographic regions of south-western Western Australia.

== Conservation status ==
Petrophile recurva is classified as "not threatened" by the Government of Western Australia Department of Parks and Wildlife
