= Helicia subcordata =

Conservation status
- Endangered (IUCN 3.1)

Scientific classification
- Kingdom: Plantae
- Clade: Tracheophytes
- Clade: Angiosperms
- Clade: Eudicots
- Order: Proteales
- Family: Proteaceae
- Genus: Helicia
- Species: H. subcordata

Binomial name
- Helicia subcordata Foreman

Species of plant endemic to Papua New Guinea

Helicia subcordata is a species of plant in the family Proteaceae. It is a tree endemic to Papua New Guinea. It is a large tree, 15 to 17 metres (49 to 56 ft) tall, which is native to the Mumeng and Wagau forest areas of Morobe Province. It grows in open mid-montane rain forest at 1,350 metres (4,430 ft) elevation. It is threatened by habitat loss.

The species was first described by Donald Bruce Foreman in 1985.
