= Ferruginine =

Chemical compounds

- (+)-Ferruginine

Identifiers
- IUPAC name: 1-(8-Methyl-8-azabicyclo[3.2.1]oct-2-en-2-yl)ethanone
- CAS Number: 73069-63-3 137331-57-8
- PubChem CID: 585756
- ChemSpider: 8187832
- ChEMBL: ChEMBL305546

Chemical and physical data
- Formula: C_{10}H_{15}NO
- Molar mass: 165.236 g·mol^{−1}
- 3D model (JSmol): Interactive image
- SMILES: CC(=O)C1=CCC2CCC1N2C
- InChI: InChI=1S/C10H15NO/c1-7(12)9-5-3-8-4-6-10(9)11(8)2/h5,8,10H,3-4,6H2,1-2H3; Key:KQIRSQYBYQBMIG-UHFFFAOYSA-N

Ferruginine is a naturally occurring tropane alkaloid isolated from rainforest tree species such as Darlingia ferruginea and Darlingia darlingiana. It acts as a nicotinic acetylcholine receptor (nAchR) agonist. Nicotinic agonists have been studied for their possible roles in cognitive enhancement and in the treatment of neurodegenerative diseases.

Ferruginine is structurally related to methylecgonidine, but it contains a keto group in place of the ester. This substitution is advantageous because, unlike an ester, the keto group cannot be hydrolyzed into a carboxylic acid, a process that commonly leads to metabolic deactivation. (+)-Ferruginine is the natural enantiomer, with a reported specific rotation of $[\alpha]_D^{19} = +37$° (CHCl_{3}).

Ferruginine has long been a target in total synthesis research, with efforts directed at both its natural (+) and unnatural (−) enantiomers. The natural (+)-ferruginine acts as a potent agonist of the nicotinic acetylcholine receptor (nAchR). By contrast, the unnatural (−)-enantiomer exhibits much lower affinity for nAchR. The distinctive structural features and pharmacological properties of ferruginine and its analogues have made them attractive scaffolds for synthetic studies.

== Pharmacology ==
The natural (+)-ferruginine exhibits high affinity for the α4β2 subtype of nicotinic acetylcholine receptors (nAChRs), with K_{i} values reported as low as 3.7 nM in structure-activity studies, indicating strong potency and preference for this receptor subtype. In contrast, the synthetic (−)-ferruginine shows moderate affinity for α4β2 nAChRs, with K_{i} values in the 94–120 nM range, and a weaker affinity (about 270 nM) for the α7 subtype. Both enantiomers demonstrate significantly lower affinity for α7 nAChRs, but overall, (+)-ferruginine, the natural form, is pharmacologically distinguished by its high affinity and selectivity for central α4β2 nAChRs.

== Synthesis ==
The synthesis of ferruginine has been accomplished through a variety of strategies, reflecting its importance as a structurally complex tropane alkaloid. One of the earliest and most efficient approaches employed a tandem cyclopropanation / Cope rearrangement sequence catalyzed by dirhodium(II) tetraoctanoate (Rh_{2}(oct)_{4}), which afforded racemic ferruginine in yields of up to 96%.

Ferruginine synthesis

A related method based on a BF_{3}-induced rearrangement of aziridino cyclopropanes achieved comparable yields (~90%). Subsequent work has expanded the synthetic toolbox to include enantioselective routes from chiral pool precursors such as L-glutamic acid, catalytic asymmetric dealkoxycarbonylation strategies using pig liver esterase (PLE), and intramolecular iminium ion cyclizations. Other formal and total syntheses have employed strategies such as palladium-catalyzed intramolecular aminocarbonylation, radical-based methodologies, and total syntheses of both (–)-cocaine and (–)-ferruginine via shared intermediates. Together, these diverse approaches highlight ferruginine as a longstanding challenge in synthetic organic chemistry, with catalytic systems ranging from Rh_{2}(oct)_{4} to Wilkinson's catalyst finding application in key synthetic steps.

The unnatural enantiomer of ferruginine (see picture) was made from natural cocaine. In the cited reference it says (−)-ferruginine (cocaine isomer) was found to be an agonist for the nicotine acetylcholine receptor. However there appears to be an underlying discrepancy in that according to John W. Daly, the (+)-enantiomer was 7600nM and the value for the (−)-enantiomer was 120nM.

== See also ==
- Ferrugine
- Darlingine
- Anatoxin A
- The WF-23 analog is called PC44458708
