= C15H19NO =

The molecular formula C_{15}H_{19}NO (molar mass: 229.32 g/mol, exact mass: 229.1467 u) may refer to:

- Pronethalol (Alderlin, Nethalide)
- Furfenorex, or furfurylmethylamphetamine
- Ferrugine
