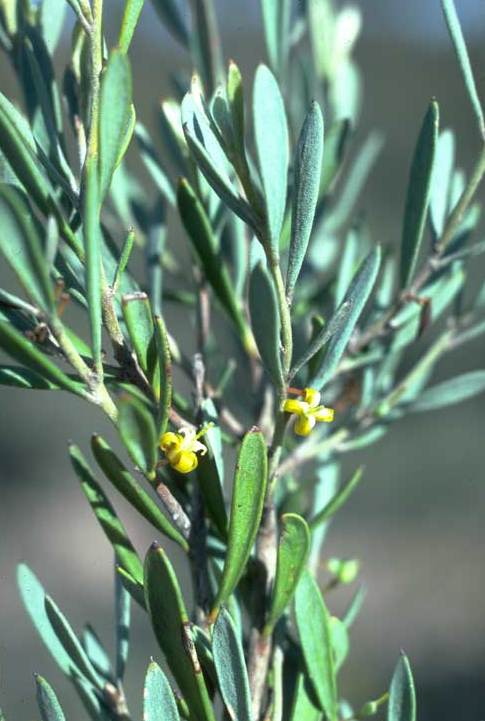
- Near Lake Grace

Conservation status
- Priority Three — Poorly Known Taxa (DEC)

Scientific classification
- Kingdom: Plantae
- Clade: Tracheophytes
- Clade: Angiosperms
- Clade: Eudicots
- Order: Proteales
- Family: Proteaceae
- Genus: Persoonia
- Species: P. brevirhachis

Binomial name
- Persoonia brevirhachis P.H.Weston

= Persoonia brevirhachis =

Species of flowering plant

Persoonia brevirhachis is a species of flowering plant in the family Proteaceae and is endemic to the south-west of Western Australia. It is an erect, often spreading shrub with smooth, compact bark, mostly narrow spatula-shaped to lance-shaped leaves with the narrower end towards the base and yellow to greenish yellow flowers borne singly or in pairs in leaf axils.

== Description ==
Persoonia brevirhachis is an erect to spreading shrub that typically grows to a height of 0.3–2 mm (0.012–0.079 in) with smooth, mottled grey bark and hairy branchlets. The leaves are narrow spatula-shaped to lance-shaped with the narrower end towards the base, 20–50 mm (0.79–1.97 in) long and 2.5–5.5 mm (0.098–0.217 in) wide. The flowers are arranged singly or in pairs in leaf axils on pedicels 1.5–5 mm (0.059–0.197 in) long. The tepals are yellow to greenish yellow, 6.5–9 mm (0.26–0.35 in) long and 1–1.5 mm (0.039–0.059 in) wide and hairy on the outside. Flowering occurs from August to October and the fruit is a smooth, oval drupe 4.5–5.5 mm (0.18–0.22 in) long and 2–2.5 mm (0.079–0.098 in) wide.

== Taxonomy ==
Persoonia brevirhachis was first formally described in 1994 by Peter Weston in the journal Telopea from specimens collected by Donald Bruce Foreman south of Lake Grace in 1984.

== Distribution and habitat ==
This geebung grows in heath between Lake Grace, Newdegate and Ravensthorpe in the south-west of Western Australia.

== Conservation status ==
Persoonia brevirhachis is classified as "Priority Three" by the Government of Western Australia Department of Parks and Wildlife meaning that it is poorly known and known from only a few locations but is not under imminent threat.
