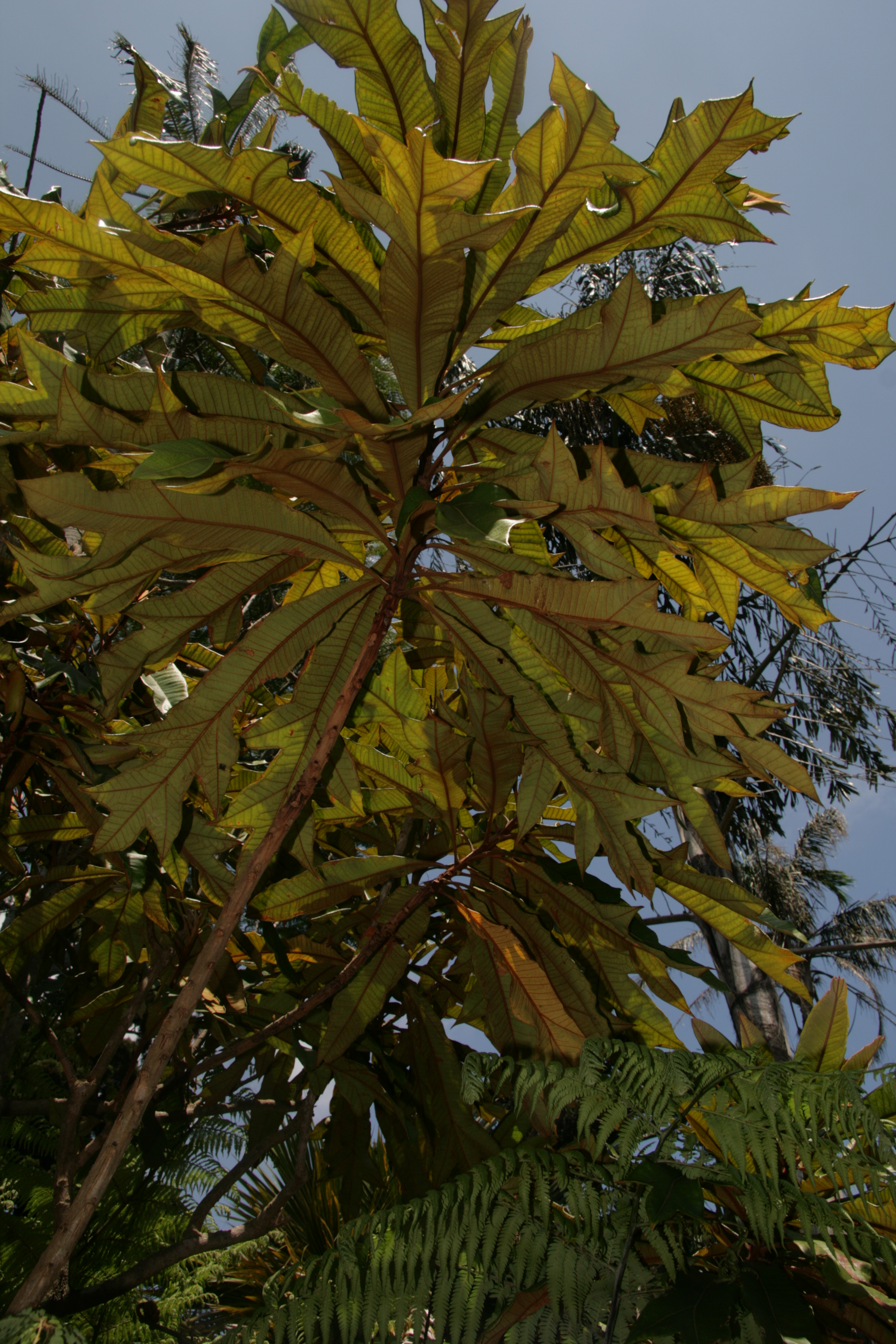

Scientific classification
- Kingdom: Plantae
- Clade: Tracheophytes
- Clade: Angiosperms
- Clade: Eudicots
- Order: Proteales
- Family: Proteaceae
- Genus: Darlingia
- Species: D. ferruginea

Binomial name
- Darlingia ferruginea J.F.Bailey

= Darlingia ferruginea =

Species of tree from Queensland, Australia

Darlingia ferruginea, commonly known as the brown silky oak, is a rainforest tree of the family Proteaceae from Northern Queensland.

== Taxonomy and naming ==
Queensland botanist John Frederick Bailey described Darlingia ferruginea in 1899. The species name is the Latin adjective ferruginea "rusty", and refers to the rust-coloured fur on the stems and leaves.

Molecular analysis indicates Darlingia ferruginea and its relative D. darlingiana join Floydia prealta as members of the subtribe Floydiinae within the subfamily Grevilleoideae in the family Proteaceae.

Common names include brown silky oak, rose silky oak, and rusty silky oak. Its everyday name in the local Dyirbal language was gurray, though a more general word gurruŋun "oak tree" (also applied to Cardwellia sublimis and Helicia australasica) was used in the taboo [Dyalŋuy] vocabulary.

== Description ==
Darlingia ferruginea grows as a tall tree in its native rainforest habitat, forming part of the canopy and reaching 30 m (100 ft) in height, though likely to only grow a third this size in cultivation. The trunk is not buttressed. The initial leaves are entire but juvenile leaves are lobed, reaching 70 cm (28 in) long. The leaf veins and undersurface, and stems are covered with fine rust-coloured hairs. Adult leaves are entire and measure 20–46 cm (8–18 in) long by 5–21 cm (2.0–8.3 in) wide. Flowering is in winter and early spring, the inflorescences are 14–22 cm (5.5–8.7 in) long.

=== Phytochemistry ===
Darlingia ferruginea contains the alkaloids darlingine, ferrugine, ferruginine and 3α-benzoyloxy-2α-hydroxybenzyltropane.

== Distribution and habitat ==
Darlingia ferruginea is found in montane rainforests from altitude 650 to 1,300 m (2,130 to 4,270 ft) on the Atherton Tableland.

== Uses and cultivation ==
Darlingia ferruginea has potential as a specimen tree in parks, and has showy flowers and foliage. It is readily propagated from seed or cuttings.
