= Admiralty Islands lowland rain forests =

Ecoregion in Papua New Guinea

- Turquoise lagoon and forested islet, Admiralty Islands

- Location of the ecoregion

Ecology
- Realm: Australasian realm
- Biome: Tropical and subtropical moist broadleaf forests

Geography
- Area: 2,099 km^{2} (810 mi^{2})
- Countries: Papua New Guinea
- Province: Manus Province
- Coordinates: 2.1°S 146.9°E

Conservation
- Conservation status: Nature could reach half protected

The Admiralty Islands lowland rain forests is a tropical moist forest ecoregion in Papua New Guinea. It covers the Admiralty Islands of Manus Province, including Manus Island and its surrounding smaller islands. The islands' long isolation has given them a number of endemic birds, mammals, reptiles, frogs and snails.

== Geography ==
The Admiralty Islands are oceanic islands of volcanic origin that rose from the sea in the late Miocene, eight to ten million years ago. They have never been joined to a larger landmass; the nearest is the north coast of New Guinea, about 280 km (170 mi) away. Manus is the largest island, and its highest point, Mount Dremsel, reaches 718 m (2,356 ft). The islands' rocks are either volcanic or uplifted coral limestone.

== Climate ==
The climate is hot and wet all year. Daytime highs are 30–32 °C and nighttime lows 20–24 °C, and annual rainfall is about 3,400 mm (130 in), with the most rain from June to August.

== Flora ==
The ecoregion's natural vegetation is lowland tropical rain forest. Along the shore is a zone of creeping plants such as beach morning glory, backed by shrubs of Sararanga and Pandanus. Inland, the forests are dominated by Calophyllum, Barringtonia and Terminalia. Helicia polyosmoides is a small tree endemic to Manus. Southwest Manus has unusual, even-aged stands of Calophyllum euryphyllum. About 1,500 native plant species are estimated to grow on Manus.

== Fauna ==
White-naped friarbird (Philemon albitorques) on Manus Island

Endemic mammals include the Admiralty Island cuscus (Spilocuscus kraemeri), the Manus Island mosaic-tailed rat (Melomys matambuai) and the large Manus Island spiny rat (Rattus detentus). The Admiralty flying fox (Pteropus admiralitatum), Andersen's naked-backed fruit bat (Dobsonia anderseni) and Seri's sheath-tailed bat (Emballonura serii) are found here and on only a few nearby island groups.

Six bird species are endemic to the ecoregion: the Manus masked owl (Tyto manusi), Manus boobook (Ninox meeki), superb pitta (Pitta superba), Manus monarch (Symposiachrus infelix), Manus fantail (Rhipidura semirubra) and white-naped friarbird (Philemon albitorques). Near-endemics include the Melanesian megapode, yellow-bibbed fruit dove, yellowish imperial pigeon, pied cuckoo-dove, Meek's pygmy parrot, black-headed white-eye and ebony myzomela.

The islands also have endemic Cornufer frogs and four endemic lizards. The green tree snail (Papustyla pulcherrima) is found only on Manus.

== Conservation and threats ==
Commercial logging and the clearing of forest for agriculture are the main threats; many of the smaller islands have been converted to coconut plantations. The forests of central Manus have been designated a Key Biodiversity Area, as have East Manus, Ninigo, Rambutyo, Tong, and the M'buke and Purdy islands. The only formally protected area is the 58.5 km^{2} (22.6 sq mi) Ndrolowa Wildlife Management Area on Manus.
