= Helicia insularis =

Conservation status
- Endangered (IUCN 3.1).

Scientific classification
- Kingdom: Plantae
- Clade: Tracheophytes
- Clade: Angiosperms
- Clade: Eudicots
- Order: Proteales
- Family: Proteaceae
- Genus: Helicia
- Species: H. insularis

Binomial name
- Helicia insularis Foreman

Species of plant endemic to Papua New Guinea

Helicia insularis is a species of flowering plant in the family Proteaceae. It is a tree endemic to the Louisiade Archipelago of Papua New Guinea. It is known only from Normanby and Rossel islands, where it grows on ridges in submontane mossy forest at 800 to 950 metres elevation.
