= Helicia symplocoides =

Conservation status
- Vulnerable (IUCN 3.1)

Scientific classification
- Kingdom: Plantae
- Clade: Tracheophytes
- Clade: Angiosperms
- Clade: Eudicots
- Order: Proteales
- Family: Proteaceae
- Genus: Helicia
- Species: H. symplocoides

Binomial name
- Helicia symplocoides R.C.K.Chung

Species of tree native to Borneo

Helicia symplocoides is a tree in the family Proteaceae, native to Borneo. The specific epithet symplocoides refers to the leaves' resemblance to those of the genus Symplocos.

== Description ==
Helicia symplocoides grows up to 15 metres (50 ft) tall, with a trunk diameter of up to 25 cm (10 in). The twigs are grey to brown. The leathery leaves are obovate and measure up to 10 cm (4 in) long. The ellipsoid fruits dry black.

== Distribution and habitat ==
Helicia symplocoides is endemic to Borneo, where it is known only from Sabah and Sarawak. In Sabah, it is confined to Kinabalu Park, in montane forests at elevations of 1,850 m (6,100 ft). In Sarawak, its habitat is hill forests, at elevations of 445 m (1,460 ft).

== Conservation ==
Helicia symplocoides has been assessed as vulnerable on the IUCN Red List. The Sarawak subpopulation is threatened by mining and urban development. The species presence in Kinabalu Park affords the Sabah subpopulation some protection.
