= Helicia maxwelliana =

Scientific classification
- Kingdom: Plantae
- Clade: Tracheophytes
- Clade: Angiosperms
- Clade: Eudicots
- Order: Proteales
- Family: Proteaceae
- Genus: Helicia
- Species: H. maxwelliana

Binomial name
- Helicia maxwelliana Gibbs

Species of plant

Helicia maxwelliana is a plant in the family Proteaceae. It is named for D. R. Maxwell, who accompanied botanist Lilian Gibbs on her 1910 Mount Kinabalu expedition, where she recorded numerous new plant species.

== Description ==
Helicia maxwelliana grows as a treelet up to 3 metres (10 ft) tall. The twigs are dark brown. The flowers are reddish brown. The round fruit is black, measuring up to 2.5 cm (1 in) in diameter.

== Distribution and habitat ==
Helicia maxwelliana is endemic to Borneo, although World Plants notes a sterile specimen from Peninsular Malaysia (Terengganu). Its habitat is montane forests at 1,600–1,700 m (5,200–5,600 ft) altitude.
