= Helicia shweliensis =

Conservation status
- Endangered (IUCN 3.1)

Scientific classification
- Kingdom: Plantae
- Clade: Tracheophytes
- Clade: Angiosperms
- Clade: Eudicots
- Order: Proteales
- Family: Proteaceae
- Genus: Helicia
- Species: H. shweliensis

Binomial name
- Helicia shweliensis W. Smith

Species of plant endemic to China

Helicia shweliensis is a species of plant in the family Proteaceae. It is endemic to China, where it is confined to Yunnan. It is threatened by habitat loss. The causes of habitat loss are attributed to a variety of factors, but the most prevalent factors include the destruction of forests in favor of constructing plantations for the production of cash crops.
