= Helicia polyosmoides =

Conservation status
- Endangered (IUCN 3.1)

Scientific classification
- Kingdom: Plantae
- Clade: Tracheophytes
- Clade: Angiosperms
- Clade: Eudicots
- Order: Proteales
- Family: Proteaceae
- Genus: Helicia
- Species: H. polyosmoides

Binomial name
- Helicia polyosmoides Foreman

Species of plant endemic to Papua New Guinea

Helicia polyosmoides is a species of flowering plant in the family Proteaceae. It is a tree, up to 25 metres tall, which is endemic to Manus Island in the Admiralty Islands of Papua New Guinea. It grows in lowland rain forest along ridge lines from 100 and 550 metres elevation. It is threatened by habitat loss. The species was described by Don Foreman in 1985.
