= Helicia attenuata =

Conservation status
- Least Concern (IUCN 3.1)

Scientific classification
- Kingdom: Plantae
- Clade: Tracheophytes
- Clade: Angiosperms
- Clade: Eudicots
- Order: Proteales
- Family: Proteaceae
- Genus: Helicia
- Species: H. attenuata

Binomial name
- Helicia attenuata (Jack) Blume

Synonyms
- Helicia bennettiana Miq.; Helicia oblongifolia Benn.; Helicia obovata Benn.; Helicia suffruticosa Ridl.; Helicia sumatrana Miq.; Roupala attenuata Jack

Species of plant

Helicia attenuata is a plant in the family Proteaceae. The specific epithet attenuata means 'drawn out', referring to the leaf base.

== Description ==
Helicia attenuata grows as a shrub or tree up to 15 metres (50 ft) tall, with a trunk diameter of up to 30 cm (12 in). Its bark is dark brown. The fruit is brown, ellipsoid, up to 5 cm (2 in) long. Helicia attenuata is among the food plants favoured by the Malayan tapir.

== Distribution and habitat ==
Helicia attenuata is native to an area from peninsular Thailand and Malaysia east to Flores in Indonesia. Its habitat is forests from 400–1,700 m (1,000–6,000 ft) elevation.
