= Helicia pterygota =

Scientific classification
- Kingdom: Plantae
- Clade: Tracheophytes
- Clade: Angiosperms
- Clade: Eudicots
- Order: Proteales
- Family: Proteaceae
- Genus: Helicia
- Species: H. pterygota

Binomial name
- Helicia pterygota Sleumer

Species of plant endemic to Borneo

Helicia pterygota is a plant in the family Proteaceae. The specific epithet pterygota means 'winged', referring to the pedicel.

== Description ==
Helicia pterygota grows as a shrub or small tree up to 7 metres (20 ft) tall, with a stem diameter of up to 6 cm (2 in). The bark is brownish.

== Distribution and habitat ==
Helicia pterygota is endemic to Borneo where it is confined to Mount Kinabalu in Sabah. Its habitat is montane forests from 1,000–1,800 m (3,300–5,900 ft) elevation.
