= Helicia amplifolia =

Conservation status
- Near Threatened (IUCN 2.3)

Scientific classification
- Kingdom: Plantae
- Clade: Tracheophytes
- Clade: Angiosperms
- Clade: Eudicots
- Order: Proteales
- Family: Proteaceae
- Genus: Helicia
- Species: H. amplifolia

Binomial name
- Helicia amplifolia Sleumer

Species of plant endemic to Papua New Guinea

Helicia amplifolia is a species of plant in the family Proteaceae. It is endemic to Papua New Guinea. It is threatened by habitat loss.
