= Helicia blakei =

- Inflorescence

Conservation status
- Least Concern (IUCN 3.1)

Scientific classification
- Kingdom: Plantae
- Clade: Tracheophytes
- Clade: Angiosperms
- Clade: Eudicots
- Order: Proteales
- Family: Proteaceae
- Genus: Helicia
- Species: H. blakei

Binomial name
- Helicia blakei Foreman

Species of plant from Queensland, Australia

Ripe fruit

Helicia blakei, also named Blake's silky oak, is a species of plant in the macadamia family Proteaceae. It is found in a small part of the Wet Tropics World Heritage Area in northeastern Queensland, Australia.

== Description ==
Helicia blakei is a small tree that may grow to about 10 m (33 ft) tall. New growth has a covering of rusty brown hairs. The petioles are 10 to 20 mm (0.4 to 0.8 in) long and are swollen at the base. The leaves are simple and may be toothed on the margins. They can reach up to 13 cm (5.1 in) long and 5 cm (2.0 in) wide. The midrib is raised above the upper surface and there are between five and eight pairs of lateral veins branching from it.

Flowers are produced on a raceme that emerges from the leaf axils or from the branches. The flowers are yellow, with tepals about 17 mm (0.7 in) long. The fruit is a blue to black drupe measuring up to 16 mm (0.6 in) long and 14 mm (0.6 in) wide. They usually contain one brown seed, or on rare occasions two.

== Distribution and habitat ==
It is restricted to rainforests of the eastern Atherton Tableland in the Topaz area, including the adjacent peaks of Mount Bellenden Ker and Mount Bartle Frere. It occurs at altitudes between 160 and 1,250 m (520 and 4,100 ft).

== Taxonomy ==
The species was described by Donald Bruce Foreman in 1984, based on a specimen collected by Stanley Thatcher Blake from eastern edge of the Atherton Tableland in 1943. The specimen had previously been identified as Helicia glabrescens, and the two species are very similar.

The species epithet blakei is named for the collector.

== Conservation status ==
This species was assessed by the International Union for Conservation of Nature (IUCN) in February 2019 and found to be of least concern. It is also rated as least concern in the Queensland Government's WildNet database under the Nature Conservation Act.

In support of its assessment, the IUCN states that although the species is restricted in its distribution, it is considered to of least concern due to the species' stable population and the lack of any perceived threat. The WildNet database does not provide any explanations for its assessments.
