= Helicia grayi =

Conservation status
- Near Threatened (NCA)

Scientific classification
- Kingdom: Plantae
- Clade: Tracheophytes
- Clade: Angiosperms
- Clade: Eudicots
- Order: Proteales
- Family: Proteaceae
- Genus: Helicia
- Species: H. grayi

Binomial name
- Helicia grayi Foreman

Species of flowering plant

Helicia grayi, also named Gray's silky oak, is a species of rainforest trees, of northeastern Queensland, Australia, from the flowering plant family Proteaceae.

They are endemic to the northern upland rainforests of the Wet Tropics region, from about 400 to 1,200 m (1,300 to 3,900 ft) altitude.

As of December 2013 this species has the official, current, Queensland government conservation status of "near threatened" species.

They have been recorded growing up to about 15 m (50 ft) tall.
