= Helicia fuscotomentosa =

Scientific classification
- Kingdom: Plantae
- Clade: Tracheophytes
- Clade: Angiosperms
- Clade: Eudicots
- Order: Proteales
- Family: Proteaceae
- Genus: Helicia
- Species: H. fuscotomentosa

Binomial name
- Helicia fuscotomentosa Suess.

Species of tree endemic to Borneo

Helicia fuscotomentosa is a plant in the family Proteaceae. It grows as a tree up to 25 metres (80 ft) tall, with a trunk diameter of up to 30 centimetres (12 in). The bark is mottled grey and black. The flowers are reddish brown. Its habitat is forests from sea level to 2,000 metres (6,600 ft) altitude. H. fuscotomentosa is endemic to Borneo.
