= Helicia lamingtoniana =

Conservation status
- Near Threatened (NCA)

Scientific classification
- Kingdom: Plantae
- Clade: Tracheophytes
- Clade: Angiosperms
- Clade: Eudicots
- Order: Proteales
- Family: Proteaceae
- Genus: Helicia
- Species: H. lamingtoniana

Binomial name
- Helicia lamingtoniana (F.M.Bailey) C.T.White ex L.S.Sm.

Synonyms
- Hollandaea lamingtoniana F.M.Bailey

Species of trees from Queensland, Australia

Helicia lamingtoniana, also named Lamington's silky oak, is a species of rainforest trees, of northeastern Queensland, Australia, from the flowering plant family Proteaceae.

They are endemic to the southern upland rainforests of the Wet Tropics region, from about 300 to 1,200 m (980 to 3,940 ft) altitude.

As of December 2013 this species has the official, current, Qld government conservation status of "near threatened" species.

They have been recorded growing up to about 20 m (66 ft) tall.
