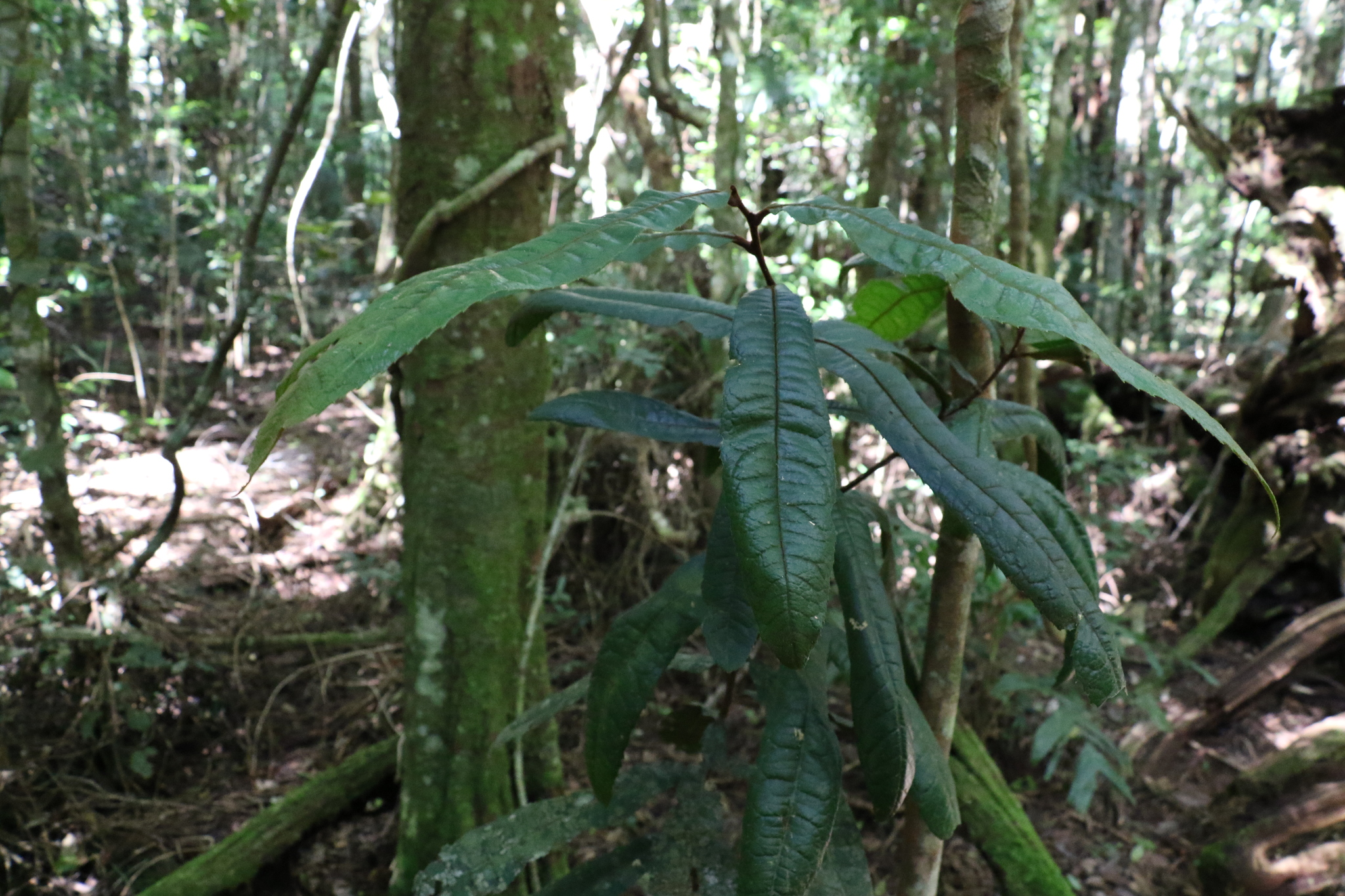

Conservation status
- Vulnerable (NCA)

Scientific classification
- Kingdom: Plantae
- Clade: Tracheophytes
- Clade: Angiosperms
- Clade: Eudicots
- Order: Proteales
- Family: Proteaceae
- Genus: Helicia
- Species: H. ferruginea

Binomial name
- Helicia ferruginea F.Muell.

Synonyms
- Helicia bauerlenii C.T.White

= Helicia ferruginea =

Species of trees from eastern Australia

Helicia ferruginea, commonly named hairy honeysuckle or rusty oak, is a species of rainforest trees, of eastern Australia, from the flowering plant family Proteaceae.

They are endemic to the rainforests of southeastern Queensland and northeastern New South Wales.

As of December 2013 this species has the official, current, Qld government conservation status of "vulnerable" species.

They have been recorded growing up to about 10 m (33 ft) tall.
