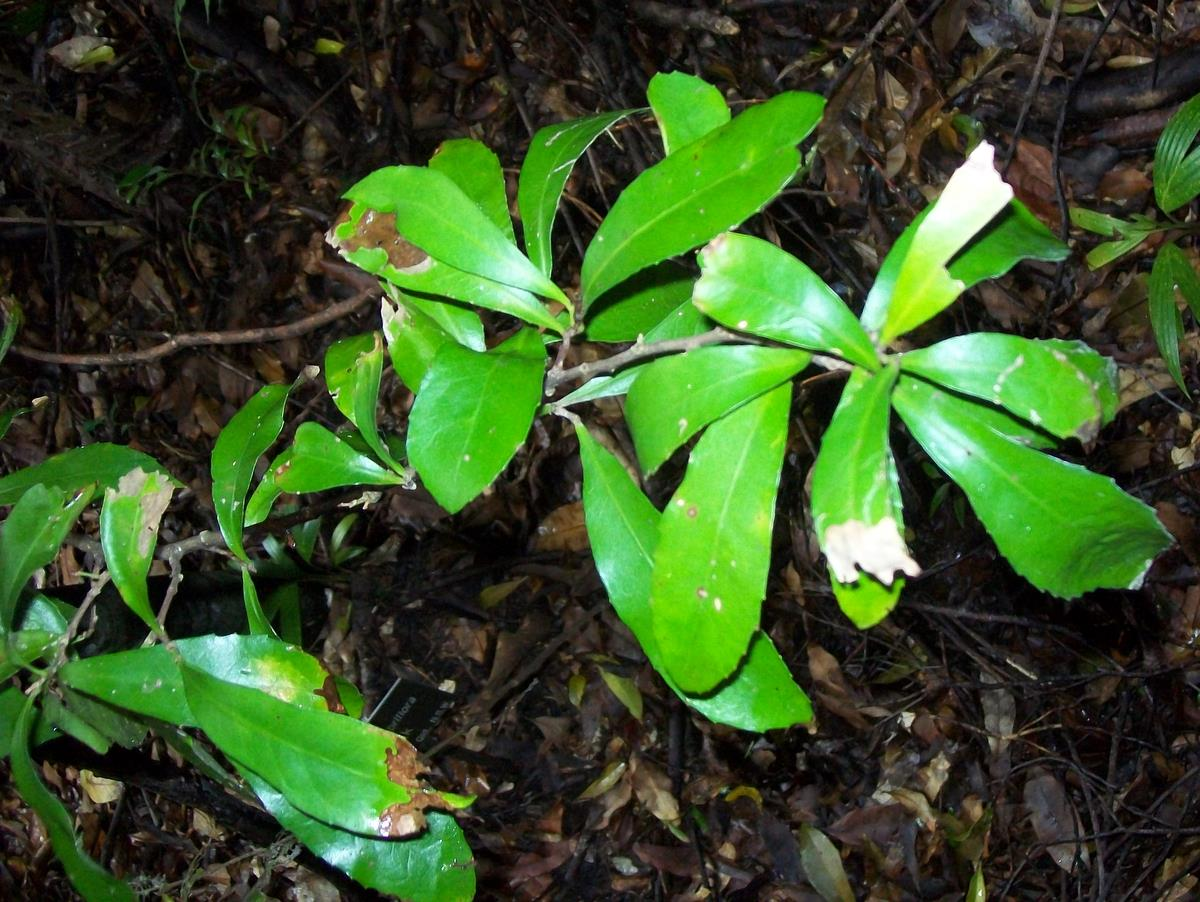

Conservation status
- Least Concern (IUCN 3.1)

Scientific classification
- Kingdom: Plantae
- Clade: Tracheophytes
- Clade: Angiosperms
- Clade: Eudicots
- Order: Proteales
- Family: Proteaceae
- Genus: Helicia
- Species: H. glabriflora

Binomial name
- Helicia glabriflora F.Muell.

= Helicia glabriflora =

Species of plant from eastern Australia

Helicia glabriflora is a species of rainforest shrubs or small trees occurring in eastern Australia. Common names include smooth or pale helicia, pale, leather or brown oak. They grow naturally in a variety of different rainforest types from the Illawarra, New South Wales (34° S) to the Townsville area, Queensland (19° S). Of all the global diversity of approximately one hundred Helicia species, this one species naturally grows the furthest south, in the Minnamurra Rainforest and the Robertson area, Illawarra, New South Wales, there observed more on the relatively fertile basalt and alluvial soils.

They grow up to 15 m (50 ft) tall with a stem diameter up to 30 cm (12 in). The grey or brown trunk is fairly smooth, with some bumps and horizontal lines. They have leathery textured leaves, 5 to 15 cm (2 to 6 in) long by 1.5 to 4 cm (0.6 to 1.6 in) wide. The leaf stems measure between 1 and 3 mm long, swollen at the base; often reduced to a pulvinus.

The yellow or white flowers open from April to September, arranged in bottle–brush–shaped compound inflorescences. The fruit is a purple blue drupe, around 16 mm (0.63 in) long, maturing from April to November, with a single green seed. The flowers and fruit have the characteristic appearance of the plant family Proteaceae. The seeds are slow to germinate, usually complete after three months with a 90% success rate.
