= Helicia excelsa =

Conservation status
- Least Concern (IUCN 3.1)

Scientific classification
- Kingdom: Plantae
- Clade: Tracheophytes
- Clade: Angiosperms
- Clade: Eudicots
- Order: Proteales
- Family: Proteaceae
- Genus: Helicia
- Species: H. excelsa

Binomial name
- Helicia excelsa (Roxb.) Blume

Synonyms
- Roupala excelsa Roxb.; Alseodaphne crassipes Hook.f.; Helicia oblanceolata Merr.; Helicia salicifolia C.Presl

Species of flowering plant

Helicia excelsa is a plant in the family Proteaceae. It is native to tropical Asia.

== Description ==
Helicia excelsa grows as a tree up to 20 m (70 ft) tall, with a trunk diameter of up to 25 cm (10 in). The bark is dark grey to blackish. Inflorescences bear up to three reddish brown flowers. The fruit drys black and is ellipsoid, up to 3 cm (1.2 in) long. The timber is locally used in construction.

== Taxonomy ==
Helicia excelsa was first described as Roupala excelsa by the Scottish botanist William Roxburgh in 1820. In 1834, Carl Ludwig Blume transferred the species to the genus Helicia. The type specimen was collected in Chittagong (present-day Bangladesh). The specific epithet excelsa means 'lofty', referring to the tree's growth.

== Distribution and habitat ==
Helicia excelsa is native to Northeast India, the Andaman and Nicobar Islands, Bangladesh, mainland Southeast Asia, Borneo and Sumatra. Its habitat is in swamp, dipterocarp and montane forests from sea level to 1,700 m (5,600 ft) altitude.

== Conservation ==
Helicia excelsa has been assessed as least concern on the IUCN Red List. The species is broadly distributed and is not considered threatened, except in the Andaman Islands where the species is rare.
