= Musgravea stenostachya =

Scientific classification
- Kingdom: Plantae
- Clade: Tracheophytes
- Clade: Angiosperms
- Clade: Eudicots
- Order: Proteales
- Family: Proteaceae
- Genus: Musgravea
- Species: M. stenostachya

Binomial name
- Musgravea stenostachya F.Muell.

Species of tree from Queensland, Australia

Musgravea stenostachya, commonly known as the crater oak or grey silky oak, is a species of rainforest tree of the family Proteaceae from north-eastern Queensland. It was described in 1890 by Ferdinand von Mueller, having been collected on Mount Bellenden-Ker.
