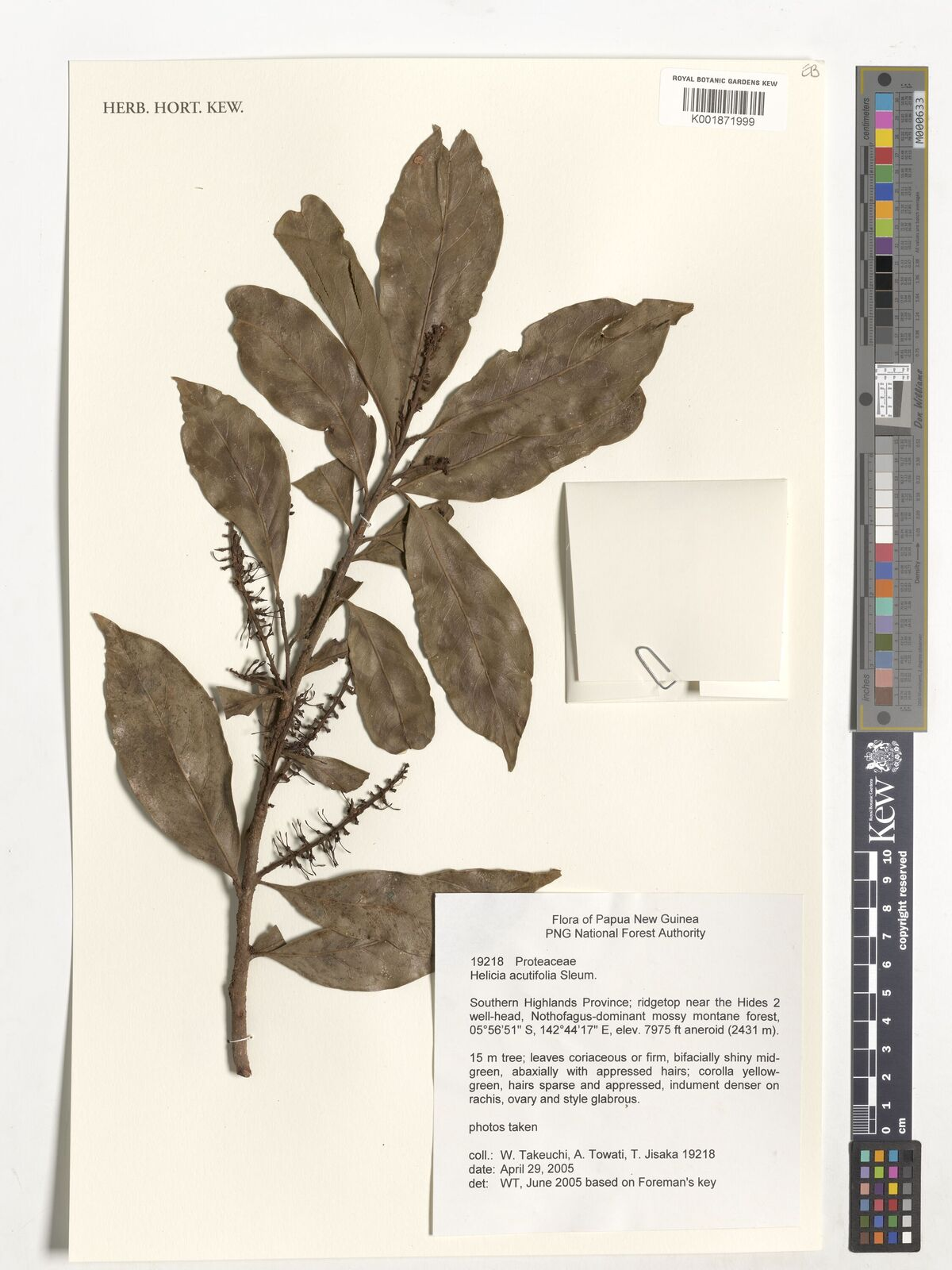
- Herbarium specimen

Conservation status
- Vulnerable (IUCN 3.1)

Scientific classification
- Kingdom: Plantae
- Clade: Tracheophytes
- Clade: Angiosperms
- Clade: Eudicots
- Order: Proteales
- Family: Proteaceae
- Genus: Helicia
- Species: H. acutifolia

Binomial name
- Helicia acutifolia Sleumer

= Helicia acutifolia =

Species of plant endemic to Papua New Guinea

Helicia acutifolia is a species of flowering plant in the family Proteaceae. It is a tree endemic to Papua New Guinea.
