= Helicia grandifolia =

Conservation status
- Vulnerable (IUCN 2.3)

Scientific classification
- Kingdom: Plantae
- Clade: Tracheophytes
- Clade: Angiosperms
- Clade: Eudicots
- Order: Proteales
- Family: Proteaceae
- Genus: Helicia
- Species: H. grandifolia

Binomial name
- Helicia grandifolia Lecomte

Species of plant endemic to Vietnam

Helicia grandifolia is a species of plant in the family Proteaceae. It is endemic to Vietnam.
