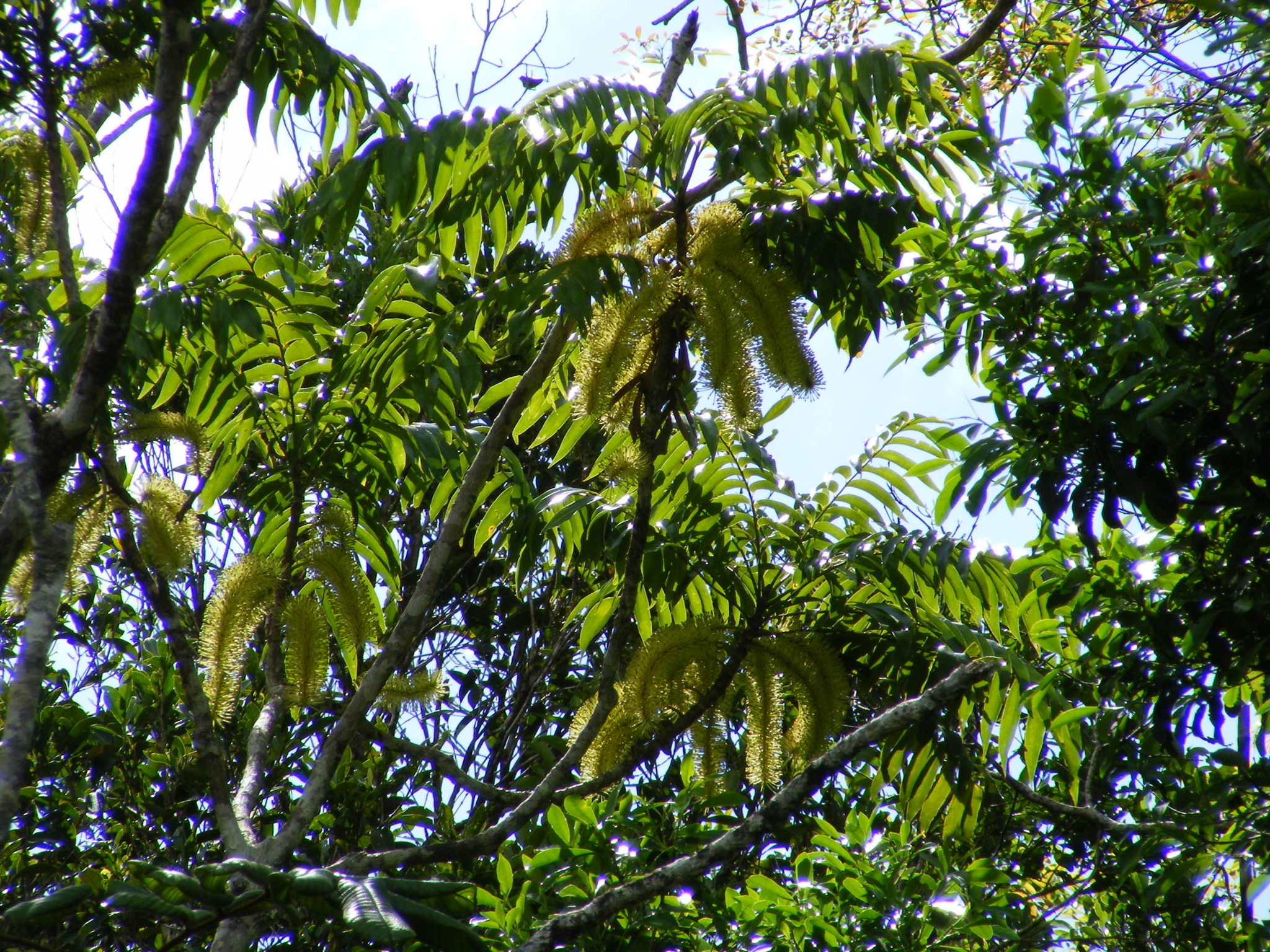
- A. trinervia

Scientific classification
- Kingdom: Plantae
- Clade: Tracheophytes
- Clade: Angiosperms
- Clade: Eudicots
- Order: Proteales
- Family: Proteaceae
- Subfamily: Grevilleoideae
- Tribe: Banksieae
- Subtribe: Musgraveinae
- Genus: Austromuellera; C.T.White

Species
- See text

= Austromuellera =

Genus of plants endemic to Australia

Austromuellera is a genus in the plant family Proteaceae, containing only two described species. It is placed in the tribe Banksieae, its closest relatives being the genera Musgravea and Banksia. It is endemic to restricted areas of the wet tropics rainforests of northeastern Queensland, Australia. The genus was erected in 1930 by the Australian botanist Cyril Tenison White, and named in honour of the Victorian State Botanist Ferdinand von Mueller.

== Species ==
- Austromuellera trinervia C.T.White, 1930 (type species)
- Austromuellera valida B.Hyland, 1999
