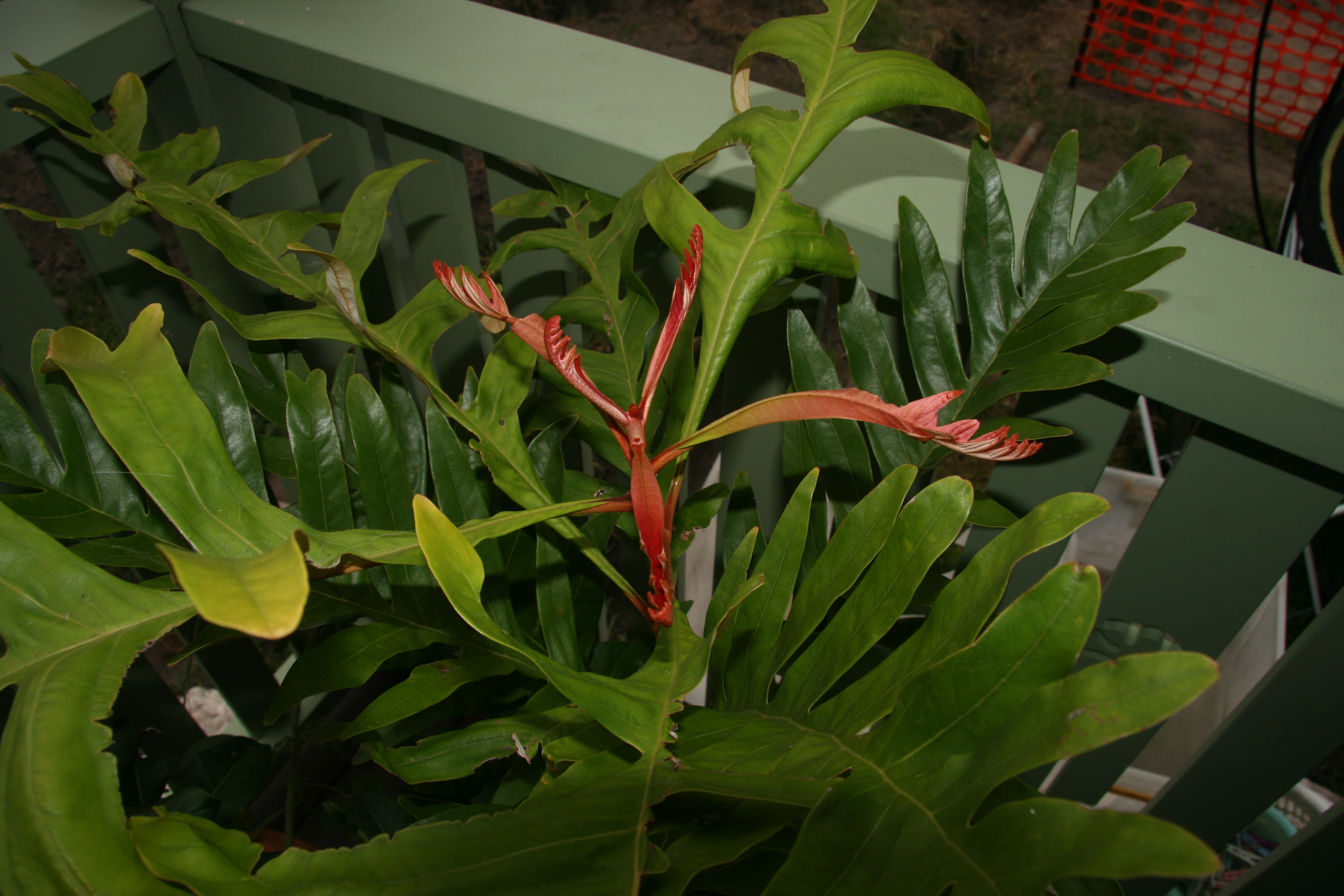
- Distinctive immature leaves of Musgravea heterophylla

Scientific classification
- Kingdom: Plantae
- Clade: Tracheophytes
- Clade: Angiosperms
- Clade: Eudicots
- Order: Proteales
- Family: Proteaceae
- Subfamily: Grevilleoideae
- Tribe: Banksieae
- Subtribe: Musgraveinae
- Genus: Musgravea (F.Muell.)

Species
- Musgravea stenostachya; Musgravea heterophylla

= Musgravea =

Genus of trees from Queensland, Australia

Musgravea is a genus of rainforest tree from northeastern Queensland.

It was published in 1890 by Ferdinand von Mueller, and named in honour of Sir Anthony Musgrave, Governor of Queensland from 1883 to 1888. Together with its closest relative Austromuellera, it lies within the subtribe Musgraveinae of tribe Banksieae in the subfamily Grevilleoideae of family Proteaceae. After Austromuellera, its closest relative is Banksia.

There are two species, M. stenostachya (crater silky oak) and M. heterophylla (briar silky oak). M. stenostachya is the type species for the genus; it was published by Mueller at the same time as the genus. M. heterophylla was published in 1969 by Lindsay Stuart Smith.
