= Helicia sessilifolia =

Scientific classification
- Kingdom: Plantae
- Clade: Tracheophytes
- Clade: Angiosperms
- Clade: Eudicots
- Order: Proteales
- Family: Proteaceae
- Genus: Helicia
- Species: H. sessilifolia

Binomial name
- Helicia sessilifolia R.C.K.Chung

Species of tree native to Borneo

Helicia sessilifolia is a tree in the family Proteaceae, native to Borneo. The specific epithet sessilifolia refers to the sessile (or stalkless) leaves.

== Description ==
Helicia sessilifolia grows up to 10 metres (33 ft) tall. The twigs are brown. The leathery leaves are elliptic to oblong and measure up to 17 cm (7 in) long. The inflorescences are solitary. The fruits dry brown.

== Distribution and habitat ==
Helicia sessilifolia is endemic to Borneo. Its habitat is dipterocarp forests, to elevations of 900 m (3,000 ft).
