= Helicia peltata =

Conservation status
- Critically Endangered (IUCN 3.1)

Scientific classification
- Kingdom: Plantae
- Clade: Tracheophytes
- Clade: Angiosperms
- Clade: Eudicots
- Order: Proteales
- Family: Proteaceae
- Genus: Helicia
- Species: H. peltata

Binomial name
- Helicia peltata C.T.White

Species of plant endemic to Papua New Guinea

Helicia peltata is a species of plant in the family Proteaceae. It is a tree endemic to Papua New Guinea. It is known from a single location at Bisiatabu in the Central Province, where it grows in lowland rain forest at 450 metres elevation. It is threatened by habitat loss.
