= Helicia peekelii =

Conservation status
- Vulnerable (IUCN 2.3)

Scientific classification
- Kingdom: Plantae
- Clade: Tracheophytes
- Clade: Angiosperms
- Clade: Eudicots
- Order: Proteales
- Family: Proteaceae
- Genus: Helicia
- Species: H. peekelii

Binomial name
- Helicia peekelii Lauterbach

Species of plant endemic to Papua New Guinea

Helicia peekelii is a species of plant in the family Proteaceae. It is endemic to Papua New Guinea.
