= Austromuellera valida =

Scientific classification
- Kingdom: Plantae
- Clade: Tracheophytes
- Clade: Angiosperms
- Clade: Eudicots
- Order: Proteales
- Family: Proteaceae
- Genus: Austromuellera
- Species: A. valida

Binomial name
- Austromuellera valida B.Hyland, 1999

Species of plant endemic to Australia

Austromuellera valida is a species of rainforest tree in the protea family that is endemic to north-eastern Queensland, Australia. It was first formally described by Bernard Hyland in 1999 in the series Flora of Australia (Vol.17B, Proteaceae).

== Description ==
The leaves are mostly simple, sometimes lobed, the blades 7–10 cm (2.8–3.9 in) long by 5.5–8 cm (2.2–3.1 in) wide, with 5.5–9 cm (2.2–3.5 in) petioles. Young shoots are densely covered with rust-brown hairs. The flowers are borne on racemes 17–30 cm (6.7–12 in) long. The fruits are 10–15 cm (3.9–5.9 in) long.

== Distribution and habitat ==
The range of the species is restricted to montane rainforest in the Mount Spurgeon, Mount Lewis and Pinnacle Rock area west of Mossman, with an altitudinal range of 1,000–1,200 m (3,300–3,900 ft).
