= Helicia rufescens =

Scientific classification
- Kingdom: Plantae
- Clade: Tracheophytes
- Clade: Angiosperms
- Clade: Eudicots
- Order: Proteales
- Family: Proteaceae
- Genus: Helicia
- Species: H. rufescens

Binomial name
- Helicia rufescens Prain

Species of tree native to Southeast Asia

Helicia rufescens is a tree in the family Proteaceae, native to Southeast Asia. The specific epithet rufescens means 'becoming reddish', referring to the indumentum of the inflorescences, twigs and leaves.

== Description ==
Helicia rufescens grows up to 25 metres (80 ft) tall, with a trunk diameter of up to 35 cm (14 in). The smooth bark is grey with lenticels. The twigs are grey to brown. The leathery leaves are elliptic and measure up to 15 cm (6 in) long. The ellipsoid fruits dry black.

== Distribution and habitat ==
Helicia rufescens is native to Borneo, Peninsular Malaysia and Sumatra. In Borneo, its habitat is lowland mixed dipterocarp and kerangas forests. In Peninsular Malaysia, it is found from sea level to elevations of 1,500 m (5,000 ft).
