= Helicia petiolaris =

Conservation status
- Least Concern (IUCN 3.1)

Scientific classification
- Kingdom: Plantae
- Clade: Tracheophytes
- Clade: Angiosperms
- Clade: Eudicots
- Order: Proteales
- Family: Proteaceae
- Genus: Helicia
- Species: H. petiolaris

Binomial name
- Helicia petiolaris Benn.

Species of plant

Helicia petiolaris is a plant in the family Proteaceae. The specific epithet petiolaris means 'stalked', referring to the leaves.

== Description ==
Helicia petiolaris grows as a small tree up to 15 metres (50 ft) tall, with a trunk diameter of up to 20 cm (8 in). Its bark is grey-brown. The fruit is black to dark brown, up to 4 cm (2 in) long.

== Distribution and habitat ==
Helicia petiolaris is native to Myanmar, Thailand, Vietnam, Peninsular Malaysia, Singapore and Borneo. Its habitat is mixed dipterocarp and kerangas forests to 2,100 m (7,000 ft) altitude.
