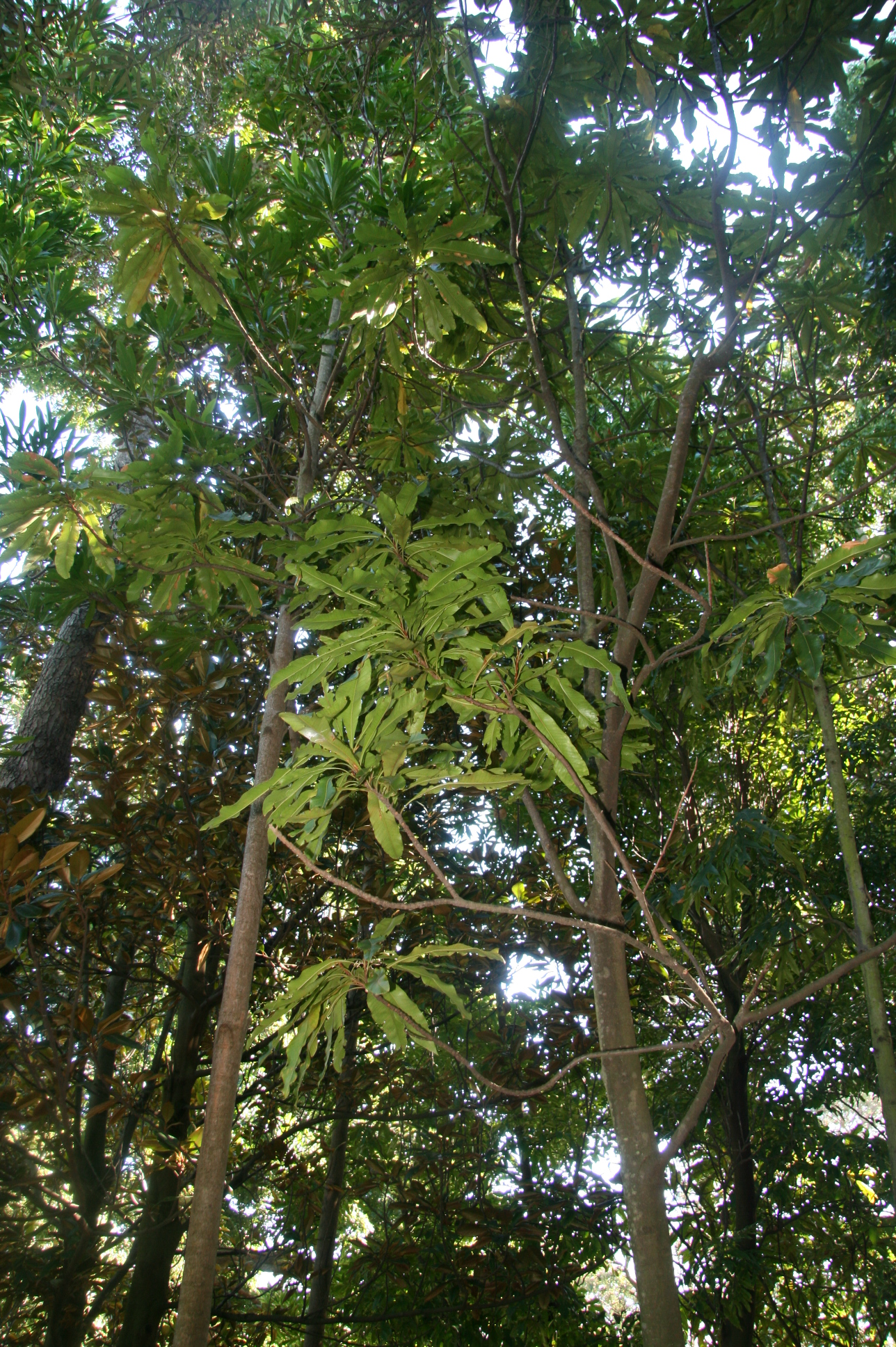
- D. darlingiana, adult foliage

Scientific classification
- Kingdom: Plantae
- Clade: Tracheophytes
- Clade: Angiosperms
- Clade: Eudicots
- Order: Proteales
- Family: Proteaceae
- Subfamily: Grevilleoideae
- Tribe: Roupaleae
- Subtribe: Floydiinae
- Genus: Darlingia; F. Muell.

Species
- Darlingia darlingiana (F.Muell.) L.A.S.Johnson; Darlingia ferruginea J.F.Bailey

= Darlingia =

Genus of tree from Queensland, Australia

Darlingia is a small genus of two species in the family Proteaceae, described by Ferdinand von Mueller in 1866. Both species are endemic to rainforest of northeast Queensland, Australia.
