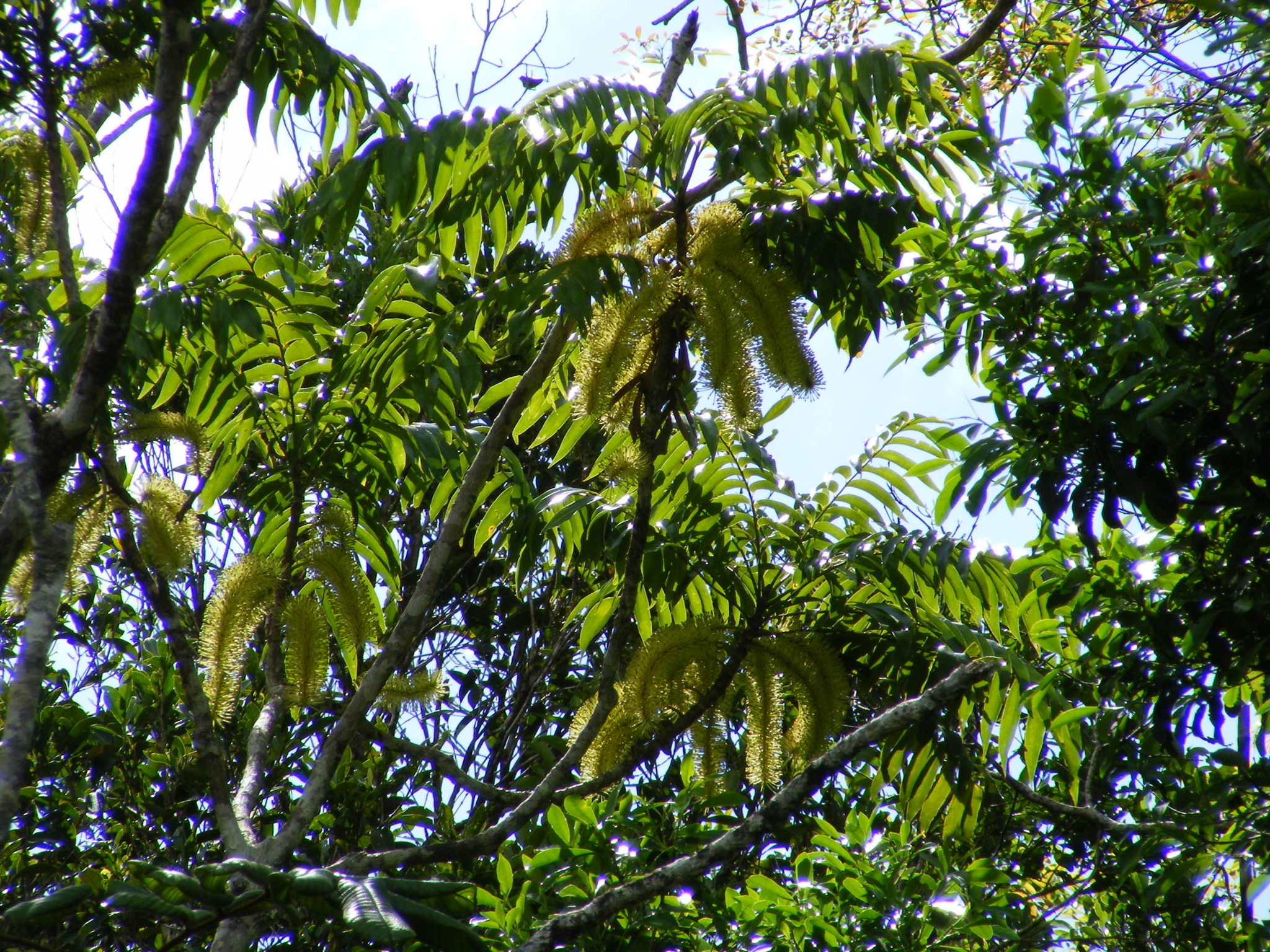

Conservation status
- Near Threatened (NCA)

Scientific classification
- Kingdom: Plantae
- Clade: Embryophytes
- Clade: Tracheophytes
- Clade: Angiosperms
- Clade: Eudicots
- Order: Proteales
- Family: Proteaceae
- Genus: Austromuellera
- Species: A. trinervia

Binomial name
- Austromuellera trinervia C.T.White
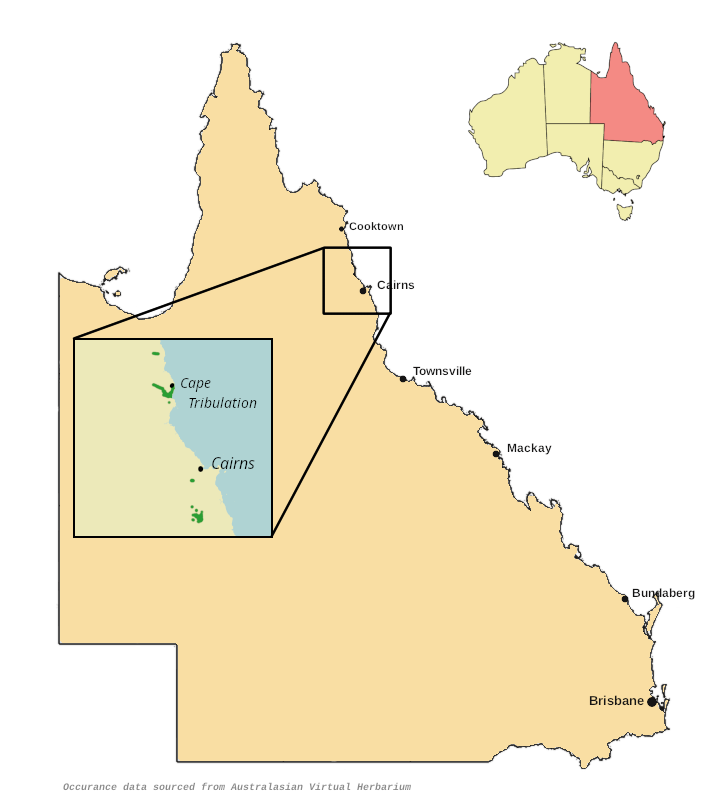

= Austromuellera trinervia =

Species of tree from Queensland, Australia

Austromuellera trinervia, commonly known as Mueller's silky oak, is a species plant in the macadamia family Proteaceae, endemic to north-eastern Queensland, Australia. It was described in 1930 by Cyril Tenison White, and has been given the conservation status of near threatened by Queensland authorities.

== Description ==
Austromuellera trinervia is a tree reaching up to about 10 m (33 ft) tall. The compound leaves grow to about 50 cm (20 in) in length, with more than six pairs of leaflets. Each of the leaflets measure up to 15 cm (5.9 in) long and 5 cm (2.0 in) wide, and they have three or four longitudinal veins.

Numerous honey-coloured flowers are produced on racemes about 30 to 70 cm (12 to 28 in) long, each with tepals measuring 17–25 mm (0.67–0.98 in) long and a style 13–21 mm (0.51–0.83 in) long. The fruit is a flat capsule about 20 cm (7.9 in) long and 6 cm (2.4 in) wide, containing a dozen or more winged seeds up to 16 cm (6.3 in) long.

=== Phenology ===
Mueller's silky oak flowers between November and January.

== Distribution and habitat ==
This species inhabits rainforest and occurs in two widely separated populations within Queensland's Wet Tropics World Heritage Area. One is in the area from Rossville to the Daintree River, and the other is on the eastern edge of the Atherton Tableland around Boonjee and Butcher's Creek. The altitudinal range is from sea level to about 800 m (2,600 ft).

== Taxonomy ==
It was first described by Australian botanist Cyril Tenison White in 1930, based on plant material he collected himself at Boonjee in 1923.

== Conservation ==
The International Union for Conservation of Nature assessed this species in 2019 and gave it the classification of least concern, however, under Queensland's Nature Conservation Act it is considered to be near threatened.

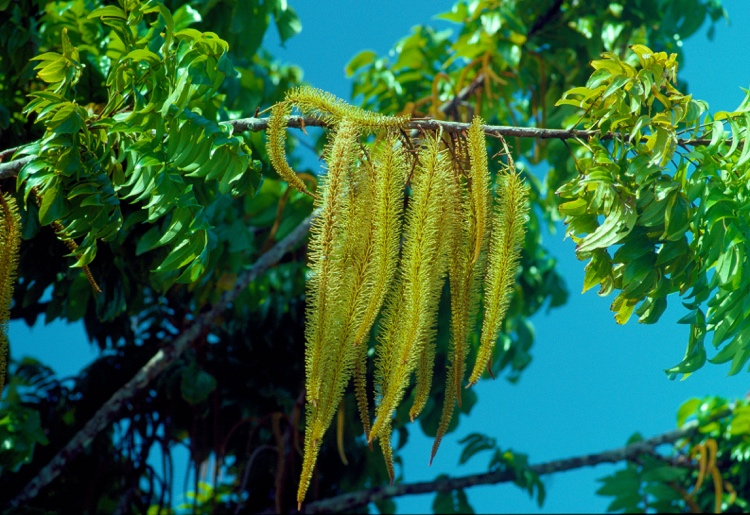
Foliage and flowers

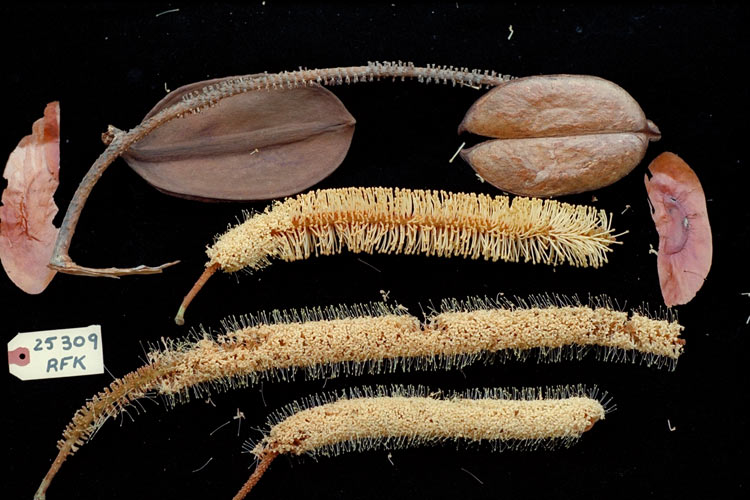
Flowers, capsules and seeds
