= Beach morning glory =

Beach morning glory is a common name for several plants and may refer to:

- Calystegia soldanella, with white or pale-pink flowers
- Ipomoea imperati, with white flowers
- Ipomoea pes-caprae, with pink or purple flowers
