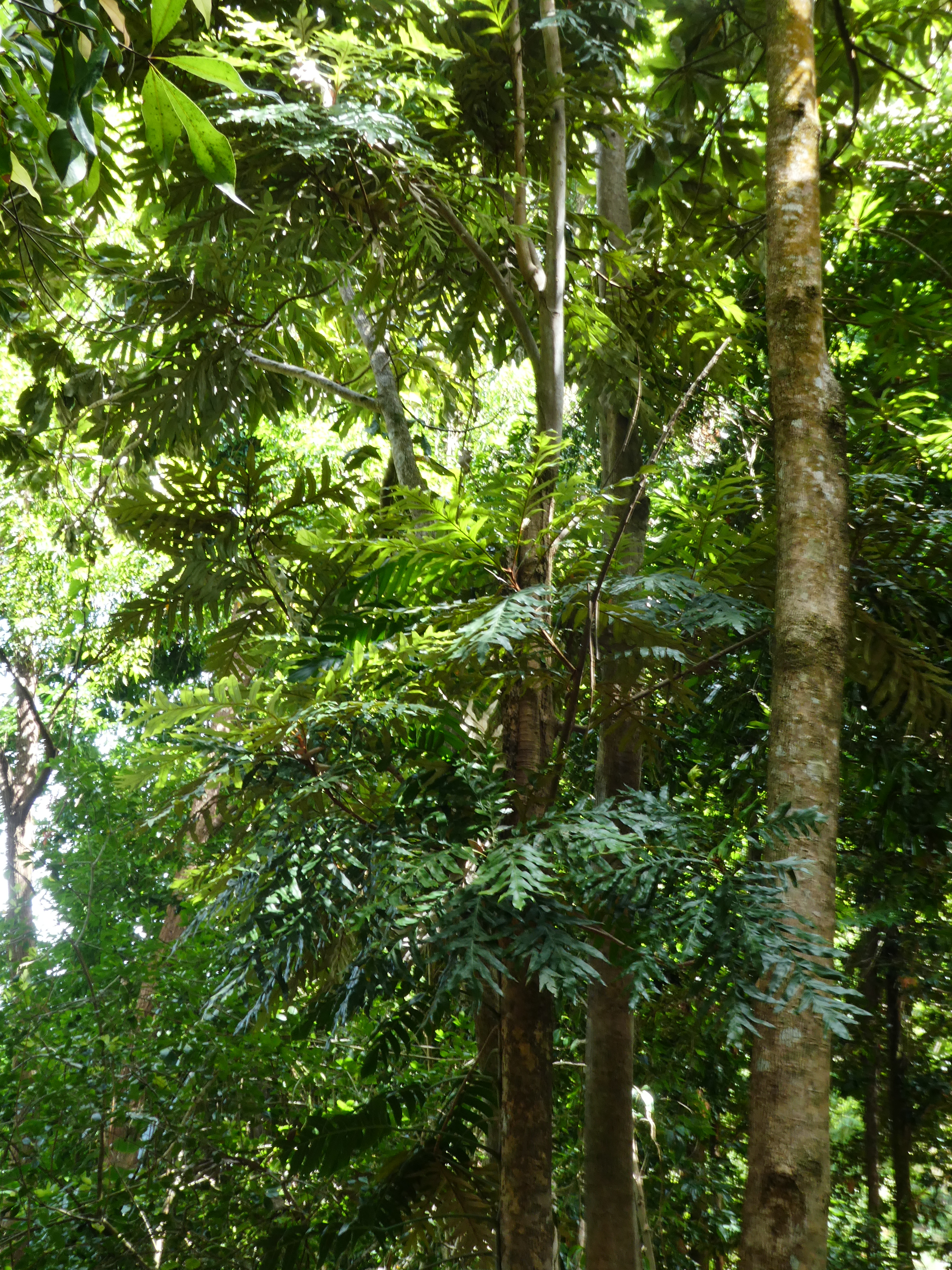
- Tree in Cairns Botanic Gardens

Conservation status
- Least Concern (NCA)

Scientific classification
- Kingdom: Plantae
- Clade: Tracheophytes
- Clade: Angiosperms
- Clade: Eudicots
- Order: Proteales
- Family: Proteaceae
- Genus: Musgravea
- Species: M. heterophylla

Binomial name
- Musgravea heterophylla L.S.Sm.

= Musgravea heterophylla =

Species of flowering plant

Musgravea heterophylla, commonly known as the briar oak, is a species of rainforest tree of the family Proteaceae from north-eastern Queensland. It was described in 1969 by Lindsay Stuart Smith, having been collected near Kuranda.
