= Helicia neglecta =

Conservation status
- Endangered (IUCN 3.1)

Scientific classification
- Kingdom: Plantae
- Clade: Tracheophytes
- Clade: Angiosperms
- Clade: Eudicots
- Order: Proteales
- Family: Proteaceae
- Genus: Helicia
- Species: H. neglecta

Binomial name
- Helicia neglecta Diels ex Sleum.

Species of plant endemic to Papua New Guinea

Helicia neglecta is a species of flowering plant in the family Proteaceae. It is endemic to Papua New Guinea. It is threatened by habitat loss.
