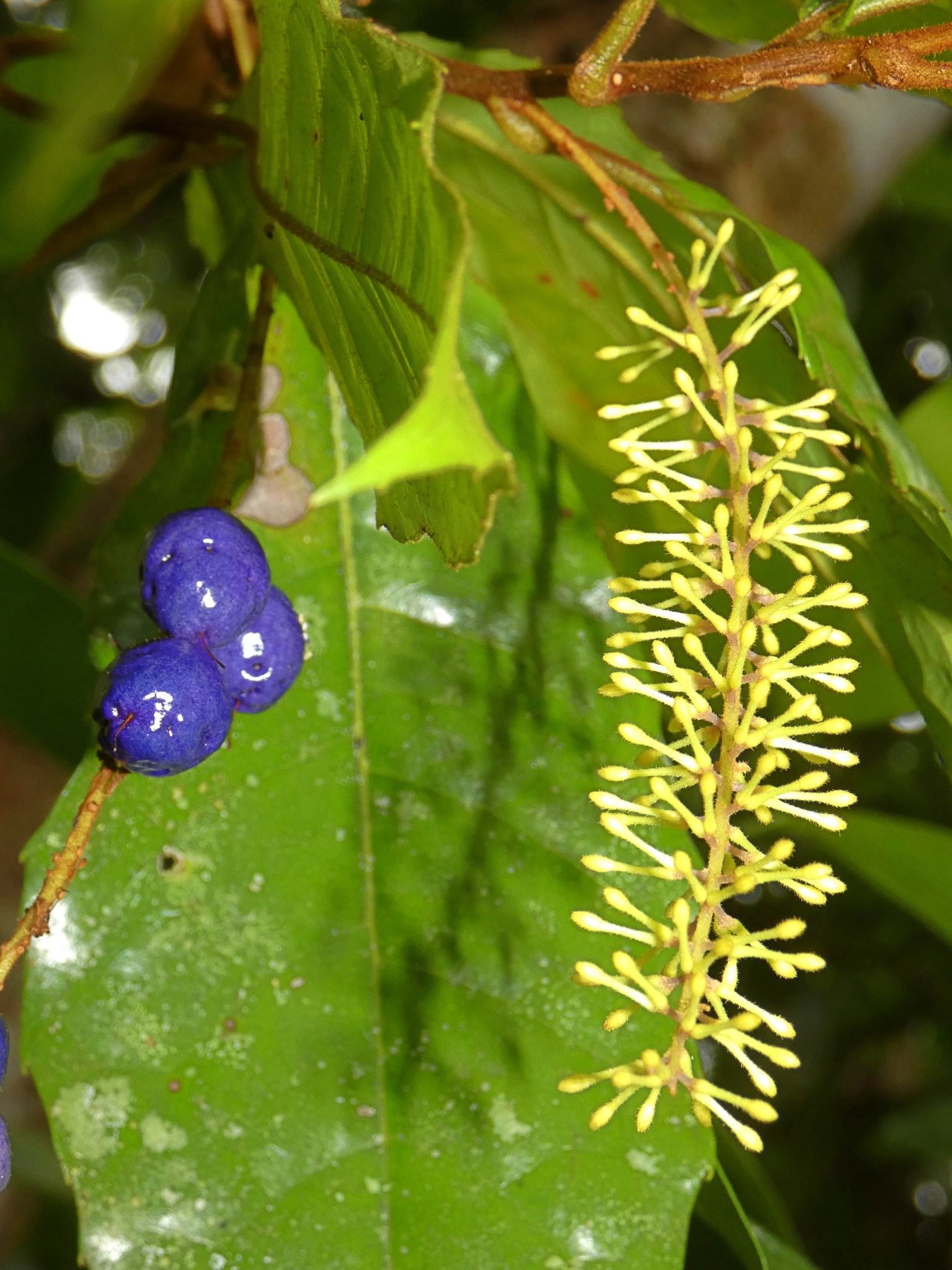
- Fruit and a budding inflorescence

Conservation status
- Least Concern (IUCN 3.1)

Scientific classification
- Kingdom: Plantae
- Clade: Tracheophytes
- Clade: Angiosperms
- Clade: Eudicots
- Order: Proteales
- Family: Proteaceae
- Genus: Helicia
- Species: H. nortoniana

Binomial name
- Helicia nortoniana (F.M.Bailey) F.M.Bailey

Synonyms
- Helicia ferruginea var. tropica F.M.Bailey

= Helicia nortoniana =

Norton's silky oak

Species of tree endemic to Australia

Helicia nortoniana, also known as Norton's silky oak, is a species of tree in the family Proteaceae growing to about 20 m (66 ft) tall. It is endemic to the rainforests of the Wet Tropics region of Queensland, Australia, and occurs at altitudes from sea level to about 1,000 m (3,300 ft).
