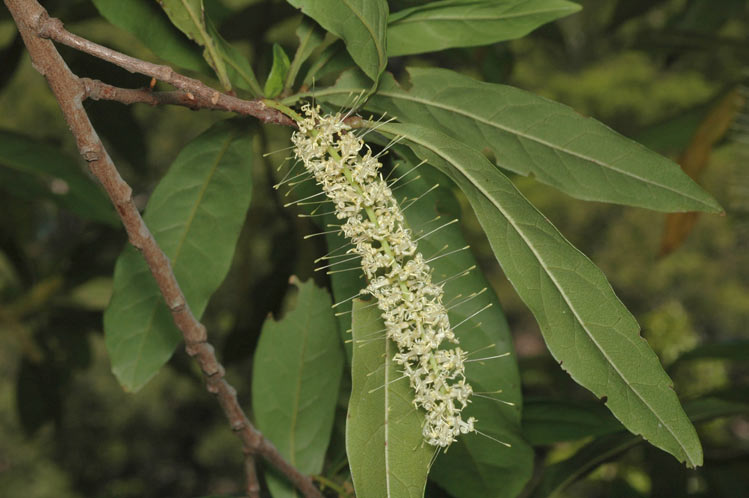
- Inflorescence

Conservation status
- Least Concern (IUCN 3.1)

Scientific classification
- Kingdom: Plantae
- Clade: Tracheophytes
- Clade: Angiosperms
- Clade: Eudicots
- Order: Proteales
- Family: Proteaceae
- Genus: Helicia
- Species: H. australasica

Binomial name
- Helicia australasica F.Muell.

= Helicia australasica =

Austral oak

Species of plant

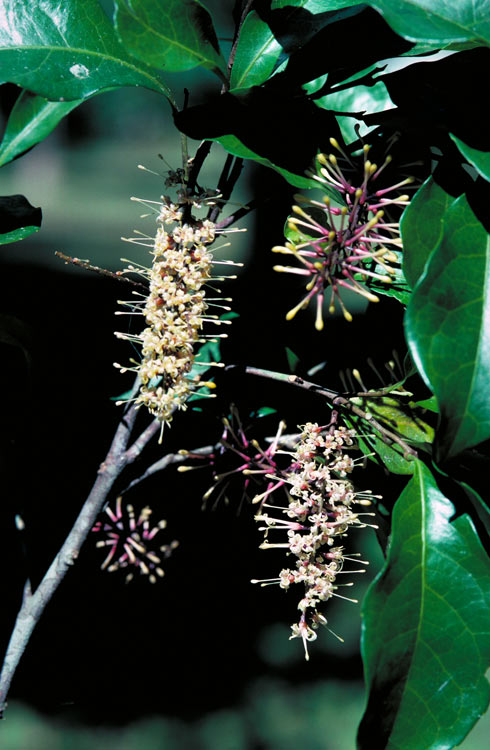
Inflorescences

Helicia australasica, also known as Austral oak or creek silky oak, is a species of rainforest tree in the macadamia family Proteaceae, native to New Guinea and northern and northeastern Australia.

== Description ==
Helicia australasica is a shrub or small tree up to about 20 m (66 ft) tall with a trunk that rarely exceeds 30 cm (12 in) diameter. Twigs are terete (rounded) in cross-section, and younger parts – i.e. the soft non-woody parts – may be covered in fine rusty brown hairs. Older parts of twigs and branches are hairless and more or less smooth and grey. The leaf shape is variable and may be elliptic, oblong or lanceolate. Leaves are up to 23 cm (9.1 in) long by 8.5 cm (3.3 in) wide, and held on a petiole up to 10 mm (0.39 in) long. They have 6–10 pairs of lateral veins that curve throughout their length, and the leaf margin is irregularly toothed.

The inflorescences are produced in the leaf axils or directly from the branches (a process called ramiflory) and may reach 17 cm (6.7 in) in length. Flowers are numerous, paired, each pair sharing a branched pedicel arising from the main axis of the inflorescence. The fruit is a drupe, blue to black in colour with a smooth skin. They grow up to 15 mm (0.59 in) long by 11 mm (0.43 in) wide and contain a single seed up to 12 mm (0.47 in) long.

== Taxonomy ==
This plant was first described by Ferdinand von Mueller, and published in Hooker's Journal of Botany & Kew Garden Miscellany in 1857. The type species was collected in 1855 near the Macadam Range, southwest of Darwin in the Northern Territory.

=== Synonymy ===
Helicia glabrescens C.T.White (1944), and Helicia dentellata Sleumer (1939), were both placed in synonymy with H. australasica by the Australian botanist Donald Bruce Foreman in 1983, a position that is accepted by the Australian Plant Name Index. However Plants of the World Online still recognises both as distinct species. No other synonyms or infraspecies have been proposed.

=== Indigenous names ===
In the language of the Dyirbal people of northeast Queensland, this plant was known as miyabur, though the more general word gurruŋun – "oak tree" – was used in the taboo, or Dyalŋuy, vocabulary.

== Distribution and habitat ==
This species is naturally widespread in the "Top End" of the Northern Territory, along the east coast of Cape York Peninsula, and in south-central New Guinea. It grows alongside watercourses in drier rainforest types, at altitudes from sea level to about 1,100 m (3,600 ft) altitude.

== Conservation ==
There are no significant threats identified for the species, and it has been assessed as least concern under the Northern Territory's TPWCA legislation, Queensland's NCA legislation, and by the International Union for Conservation of Nature.

== Cultural ==
The fruit was eaten raw by indigenous Australians.
