= Ferrugine =

Chemical compound

(+)-Ferrugine

Identifiers
- IUPAC name: (8-methyl-8-azabicyclo[3.2.1]octan-2-yl)-phenylmethanone
- CAS Number: 58471-11-7
- PubChem CID: 102489592
- ChemSpider: 127384569

Chemical and physical data
- Formula: C_{15}H_{19}NO
- Molar mass: 229.323 g·mol^{−1}
- 3D model (JSmol): Interactive image
- SMILES: C(=O)([C@@H]1[C@]2(N(C)[C@@](CC1)(CC2)[H])[H])C3=CC=CC=C3
- InChI: InChI=1S/C15H19NO/c1-16-12-7-9-13(14(16)10-8-12)15(17)11-5-3-2-4-6-11/h2-6,12-14H,7-10H2,1H3/t12-,13-,14-/m0/s1; Key:FKBXXVPBVMWIDS-IHRRRGAJSA-N

Ferrugine (2α-benzoyltropane) is a tropane alkaloid discovered in the basic extract of the Australian rainforest tree Darlingia ferruginea where it occurs in the leaves and stems. The structure has been determined through spectroscopic analysis and confirmed by chemical synthesis.

(+)-Ferrugine is the natural enantiomer, with a reported specific rotation of $[\alpha]_D^{19} = +55$° (CHCl_{3}).

== See also ==
- Ferruginine
