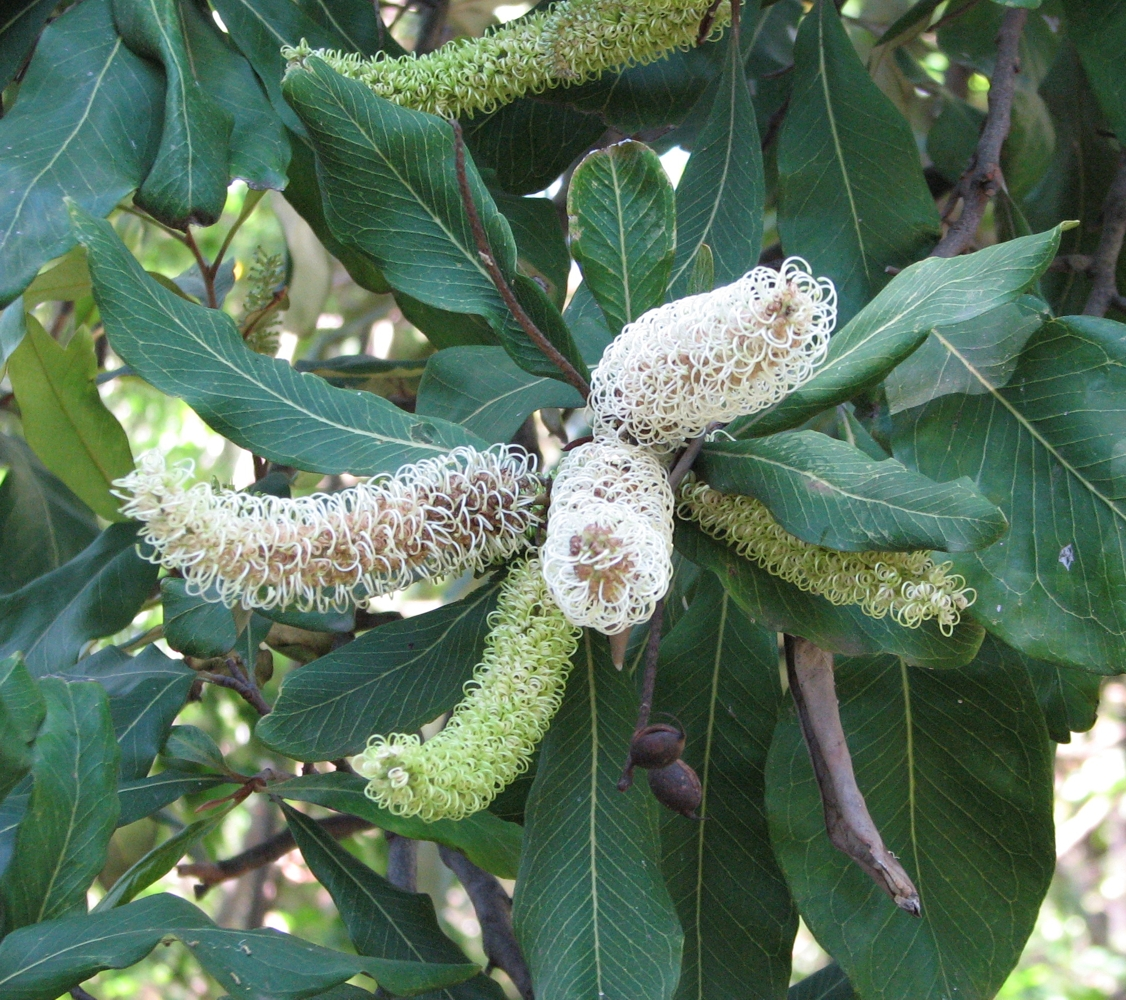

Conservation status
- Least Concern (IUCN 3.1)

Scientific classification
- Kingdom: Plantae
- Clade: Embryophytes
- Clade: Tracheophytes
- Clade: Angiosperms
- Clade: Eudicots
- Order: Proteales
- Family: Proteaceae
- Genus: Grevillea
- Species: G. hilliana

Binomial name
- Grevillea hilliana F.Muell.

= Grevillea hilliana =

Species of shrub endemic to Australia

Grevillea hilliana, commonly known as white silky oak, white yiel yiel, Hill's silky oak and grey oak, is a species of flowering plant in the family Proteaceae and is endemic to eastern Australia. It is a tree with lance-shaped to oblong or lobed adult leaves and cylindrical clusters of large numbers of white to pale green flowers.

== Description ==
Grevillea hilliana is a tree that typically grows to a height of 8–30 m (30–100 ft). Young plants usually have divided leaves, mostly 250–400 mm (10–16 in) long and 150–300 mm (6–12 in) wide with three to ten linear to lance-shaped lobes 80–250 mm (3–10 in) long and 10–50 mm (0.4–2.0 in) wide, the lower surface silky-hairy. Adult leaves are lance-shaped to oblong, 90–240 mm (4–9 in) long and 15–60 mm (0.6–2.4 in) wide, or sometimes divided with four to six oblong to egg-shaped lobes 60–120 mm (2.4–4.7 in) long and 20–40 mm (0.8–1.6 in) wide and silky-hairy on the lower surface. The flowers are arranged in large, cylindrical groups 80–220 mm (3–9 in) long and are white to pale green, the pistil 13.5–16 mm (0.53–0.63 in) long and glabrous. Flowering mainly occurs from July to October, often in other months, and the fruit is a glabrous, oval to elliptic follicle 17–26 mm (0.7–1.0 in) long.

== Taxonomy ==
Grevillea hilliana was first formally described in 1857 by Ferdinand von Mueller in the Transactions of the Philosophical Institute of Victoria from specimens collected in "forests at the Pine River of Moreton Bay" by Mueller and Walter Hill. The specific epithet (hilliana) honours Walter Hill.

== Distribution and habitat ==
White silky oak grows in, or near the edges of rainforest in near-coastal areas from sea level to an altitude of 600 m (2,000 ft) and is found from near Cooktown in far northern Queensland to near the Brunswick River in north-eastern New South Wales. In New South Wales, it is only known from small, fragmented populations near Brunswick Heads and in remnant patches of habitat in the Tweed Shire.

== Conservation status ==
This grevillea is listed as least concern on the IUCN Red List of Threatened Species and under the Queensland Government Nature Conservation Act 1992 but as endangered under the New South Wales Government Biodiversity Conservation Act 2016. It has a widespread distribution and does not face any major threats overall. Although it is widespread and locally common within Queensland, the New South Wales populations are small and fragmented, with an estimate of fewer than 100 mature individuals.
