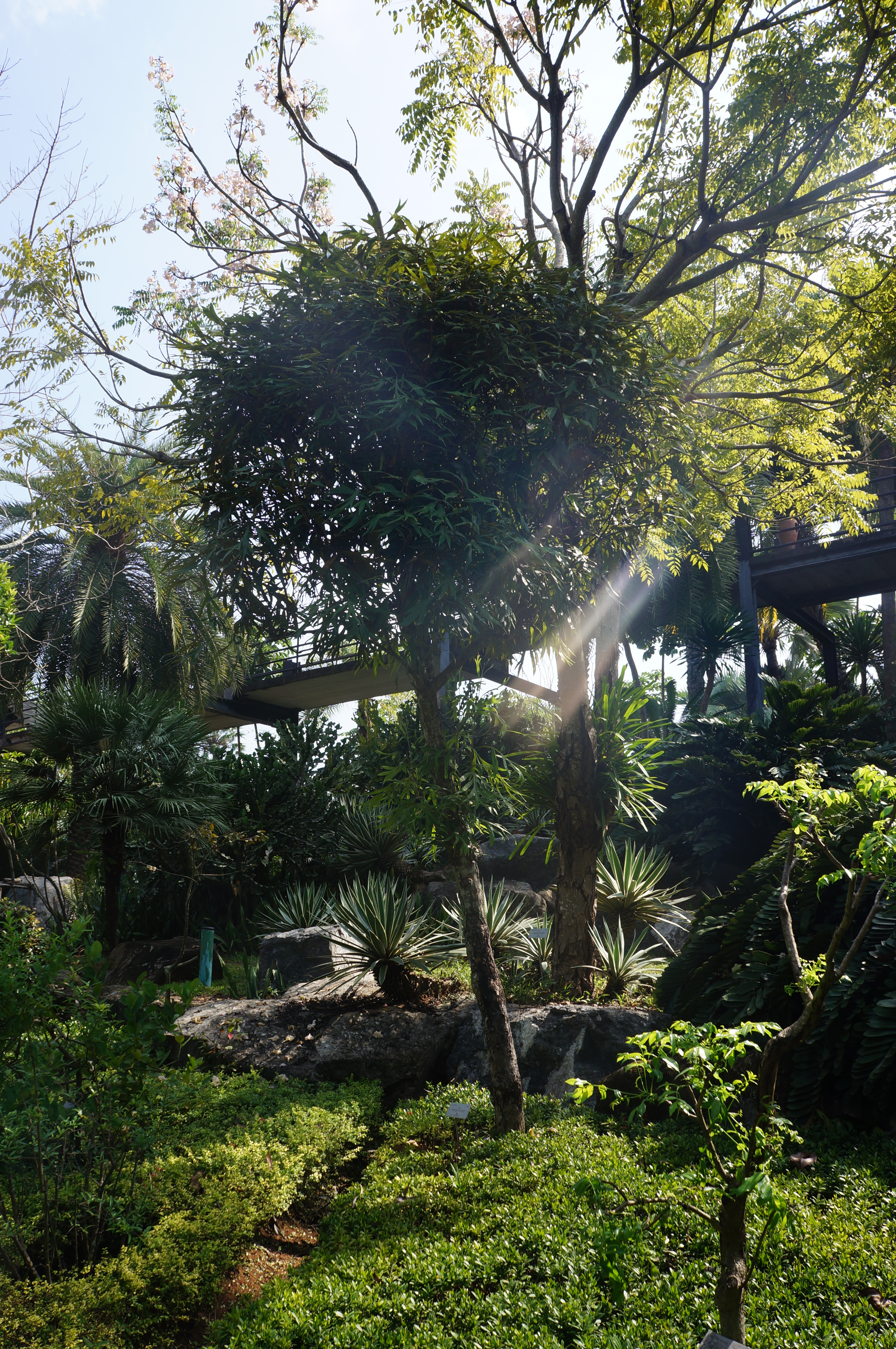

Scientific classification
- Kingdom: Plantae
- Clade: Tracheophytes
- Clade: Angiosperms
- Clade: Eudicots
- Order: Proteales
- Family: Proteaceae
- Genus: Darlingia
- Species: D. darlingiana

Binomial name
- Darlingia darlingiana (F.Muell.) L.A.S.Johnson

Synonyms
- Helicia darlingiana F.Muell.

= Darlingia darlingiana =

Species of tree from Queensland, Australia

Darlingia darlingiana is a rainforest tree of the family Proteaceae from Northern Queensland. It was described by Ferdinand von Mueller in 1865 as Helicia darlingiana.

Darlingia darlingiana contains a range of alkaloids, the primary one being darlingine, and the majority belonging to the pyrrolidine group.
