= Don Foreman =

Australian botanist

- Born: Donald Bruce Foreman; 27 May 1945; Trangie, New South Wales, Australia
- Died: 9 March 2004 (aged 58); Geelong, Victoria, Australia
- Education: University of New England
- Known for: The Monimiaceae of Australia
- Scientific career
- Fields: Botany
- Workplaces: National Herbarium of Victoria Royal Botanic Gardens Victoria
- Thesis: The morphology and phylogeny of some Monimiaceae (sensu lato) in Australia (1985)
- Author abbrev. (botany): Foreman

Donald Bruce Foreman (27 May 1945 – 9 March 2004) was an Australian botanist who worked on the Monimiaceae and Proteaceae of Australia. He also helped with the editing of selected Flora of Victoria and Flora of Australia Volumes.

== Career ==
After Foreman graduated from the University of New England in 1969, he took up a position as Forest Botanist at Lae in Papua New Guinea from 1969 to 1975. On his return to Australia he took on a Master of Science at University of New England and then followed on with his PhD. Foreman worked at the National Herbarium of Victoria from 1984 to 1998 in various roles; Botanist, Senior Botanist, Collections Manager and Editor of Muelleria. Foreman did a stint as the Australian Botanical Liaison Officer at the Royal Botanic Gardens, Kew from September 1996 to August 1997. Foreman's work finished at the National Herbarium of Victoria at the end of 1997. Foreman was an Honorary Associate at the National Herbarium of Victoria from 2000 to 2004.

During Foreman's career he collected extensively in Papua New Guinea and Australia. The majority of Foreman's collections can be found at MEL and CANB, with collections also lodged in AD, ATH, BRI, HO, K, L, LAE, NE, NSW and PERTH.

== Standard author abbreviation ==
The standard author abbreviation Foreman is used to indicate this person as the author when citing a botanical name.

== Selected published names ==
- Helicia polyosmoides Foreman

APNI

IPNI

- See also Category:Taxa named by Don Foreman

== Selected publications ==
=== MSc Thesis ===
Foreman, D.B. (1976). A taxonomic study of the genus Helicia Lour. (Proteaceae) in New Guinea and Australia with notes on origin, distribution and ecology. MSc thesis, University of New England, Armidale, New South Wales.

=== Books edited ===
==== Flora of Australia ====
- Editorial Assistant Volume 1, Introduction, Edition 2
- Editorial Assistant Volume 43, Poaceae 1
- Editorial Assistant Volume 44B, Poaceae 3

==== Flora of Victoria ====
Co-Editor

- Volume 1, Introduction

Contributor

- Volume 3, Winteraceae to Myrtaceae

=== Book Chapters or Contributions ===
- Foreman, D.B. (1972). Timber, commercial species, in Encyclopaedia of Papua New Guinea ed. P. Ryan, Melbourne University Press/University of Papua New Guinea, pp. 1124–1131
- Foreman, D.B. (1976). A nut tree from New Guinea – Finschia, West Australian Nut Growing Yearbook pp. 26–31.
- Foreman, D.B. (1978). Myristicaceae in Handbooks of the Flora of Papua New Guinea, ed. J.S. Womersley, vol. 1: 175–215. Melbourne University Press.
- Foreman, D.B. (1978). Corynocarpaceae in Handbooks of the Flora of Papua New Guinea, ed. J.S. Womersley, vol. 1: 111–113. Melbourne University Press.
- Foreman, D.B. (1990). Contributions on Flora conservation, Proteaceae, Rainforests and Flora and Vegetation, in The Penguin Australian Encyclopedia, ed. S. Dawson, O’Neil Publishing.
- Foreman, D.B. & Walsh, N.G. eds (1993). Flora of Victoria, vol. 1, Introduction, Inkata Press, Melbourne, pp. 1–320.
- Foreman, D.B. (1995). Proteaceae in Handbooks to the Flora of Papua New Guinea, vol. 3, ed. B.J. Conn, pp. 221–270. Melbourne University Press, Carlton.
- Foreman, D.B. (1995). Petrophile (Proteaceae), Flora of Australia, vol. 16, pp. 149–193. CSIRO publishing, Melbourne.
- Foreman, D.B. (1995). Isopogon (Proteaceae), Flora of Australia, vol. 16, pp. 194–223. CSIRO publishing, Melbourne.
- Foreman, D.B. (1995). Stenocarpus (Proteaceae), Flora of Australia, vol. 16, pp. 363–369. CSIRO publishing, Melbourne.
- Foreman, D.B. & Hyland, B.P.M. (1995). Buckinghamia (Proteaceae), Flora of Australia, vol. 16, pp. 371–374. CSIRO publishing, Melbourne.
- Foreman, D.B. (1995). Opisthiolepis (Proteaceae), Flora of Australia, vol. 16, pp. 373–374. CSIRO publishing, Melbourne.
- Foreman, D.B. (1995). Helicia (Proteaceae), Flora of Australia, vol. 16, pp. 393–399. CSIRO publishing, Melbourne.
- Foreman, D.B. (1995). Xylomelum (Proteaceae), Flora of Australia, vol. 16, pp. 399–403. CSIRO publishing, Melbourne.
- Foreman, D.B. (1995). Triunia (Proteaceae), Flora of Australia, vol. 16, pp. 404–407. CSIRO publishing, Melbourne.
- Foreman, D.B. (1995). Floydia (Proteaceae), Flora of Australia, vol. 16, pp. 417–419. CSIRO publishing, Melbourne.
- Foreman, D.B. (1997). Monimiaceae in Flora of Victoria vol. 3, eds N.G. Walsh & T.J. Entwisle, pp. 25, 26. Inkata Press, Melbourne.
- Foreman, D.B. (1997). Eupomatiaceae in Flora of Victoria vol. 3, eds N.G. Walsh & T.J. Entwisle, pp. 23, 24. Inkata Press, Melbourne.

=== Journal articles ===
- Foreman, D.B. (1971). A checklist of the vascular plants of Bougainville with descriptions of some common forest trees. Botany Bulletin 5, Dept of Forests, Lae, PNG
- Foreman, D.B. (1974). Notes on Myristica Gronov. (Myristicaceae) from Papuasia, Contrib. Herb. Austral-iense. 9: 35–44
- Foreman, D.B. (1977). Notes on Basisperma lanceolata C.T. White (Myrtaceae), Brunonia 1: 95–101.
- Foreman, D.B. (1983). A review of the genus Helicia in Australia, Brunonia 6: 59–72.
- Prakash, N., Foreman, D.B. & Griffiths, S.J. (1984). Floral morphology and gametogenesis in Golbulimima belgraveana (Himantandraceae), Aust. J. Bot. 32: 605–612.
- Foreman, D.B. (1985). Seven new species of Helicia Lour. (Proteaceae) from Papua New Guinea, Muelleria 6: 79–91.
- Foreman, D.B. (1985). The Helicia genus, Australian Plants 13: 226–230.
- Foreman, D.B. (1986). A new species of Helicia, new combination and lecotypification in Triunia (Proteaceae) from Australia, Muelleria 6: 193–196.
- Foreman, D.B. (1987). New species of Xylomelum Sm. and Triunia Johnson & Briggs (Proteaceae) Muelleria 6: 299–305.
- Foreman, D.B. & Sampson, F.B. (1987). Pollen morphology of Palmeria scandens and Wilkiea huegeliana (Monimiaceae), Grana 26: 127–133.
- Foreman, D.B. (1988). Wood anatomy of Idiospermum australiense (Diels) S.T. Blake, Proc. Ecologicial Soc. of Australia 15: 281.
- Foreman, D.B. (1988). Notes from the National Herbarium of Victoria – 7: Studies in Isopogon and Petrophile (Proteaceae), Vict. Naturalist 105: 74–80.
- Foreman, D.B. & Hyland, B.P.M. (1988). New species of Buckinghamia F. Muell. and Stenocarpus R. Br. (Proteaceae) from northern Queensland, Muelleria 6: 417–424.
- Sampson, F.B. & Foreman, D.B. (1988). Pollen morphology of Atherosperma, Daphnandra and Doryphora (Atherospermatacae [Monimiaceae]), Grana 27: 17–25.
- Foreman, D.B. (1990). New species of Petrophile R. Br. (Proteaceae) from Western Australia, Muelleria 7: 301–310.
- Sampson, F.B. & Foreman, D.B. (1990). Pollen morphology of Peumus boldus (Monimiaceae) – a comparison with Palmeria scandens, Grana 29: 197–206.
- Foreman, D.B. (1996). Petrophile, Conesticks, Australian Plants, vol. 19, no 149, pp. 6–29 & 32.
- Foreman, D.B. (1996). Isopogon, Drumsticks, Australian Plants, vol. 19, no 150, pp. 62–78.
- Foreman, D.B. (1998). New species of Helicia Lour. (Proteaceae) from the Vogelkop Peninsula, Irian Jaya. Kew Bull. 53: 672–674.
- Foreman, D. (1998) A personal tribute to Emeritus Professor Noel Charles William Beadle, 20 December 1914 to 13 October 1998. Austral. Syst. Bot. Soc. Nsltr. 97: 24–25.
- Renner, S.S., Foreman, D.B. & Murray, D. (2000). Timing transarctic disjunctions in the Atherospermataceae (Laurales): evidence from coding and noncoding chloroplast sequences, Systematic Biology 49: 579–591.

=== Abstracts ===
Foreman, D.B. (1981) Embryological and anatomical studies in the Monimiaceae/Atherospermataceae and their position in a putatively phylogenetic classification. In XIII International Botanical Congress, Sydney, Australia 21–28 August 1981: Abstracts. Sydney, Australian Academy of Science. 283.
