= Maranoa Botanic Gardens =

Botanical gardens in Balwyn, Melbourne, Australia

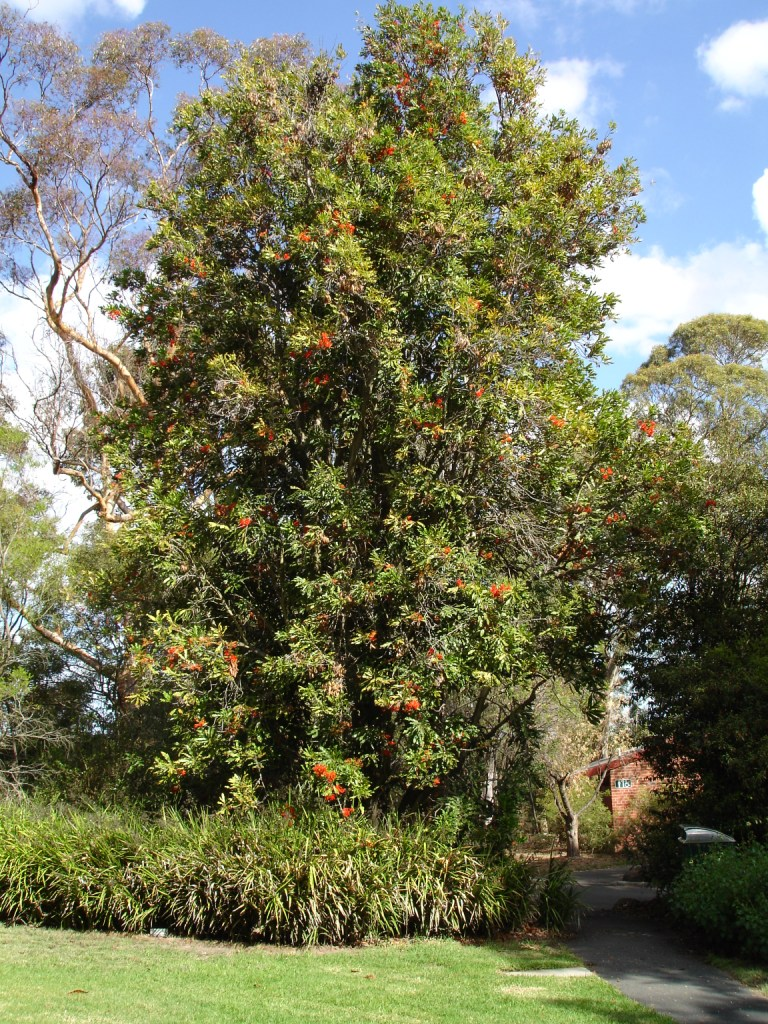
- Stenocarpus sinuatus planted in 1924

- Location within Melbourne
- Interactive map of Maranoa Botanic Gardens
- Type: Botanic garden
- Location: Balwyn, Melbourne, Victoria, Australia
- Coordinates: 37°48′38″S 145°5′25″E
- Area: 3.5 ha (8.6 acres)
- Created: 1901
- Opened: 18 September 1926; 99 years ago
- Etymology: Maranoa River
- Operator: City of Boroondara
- Open: Mon-Fri: 7:30am to 4:00pm; Sat-Sun: 10:00am to 5:00pm; (Daylight saving hours may apply.); Closed: Good Friday, Christmas
- Status: Open
- Vegetation: Australian native plants
- Public transit: –
- Facilities: Seating and tables; toilets; walking track
- Website: boroondara.vic.gov.au

The Maranoa Botanic Gardens is a 3.5-hectare (8.6-acre) botanical garden located in Balwyn, Melbourne, Victoria, Australia. It is significant as being one of the first and only botanical gardens in the world dedicated solely to Australian native plants.

The garden is administered by the City of Boroondara.

== History ==
=== Establishment ===
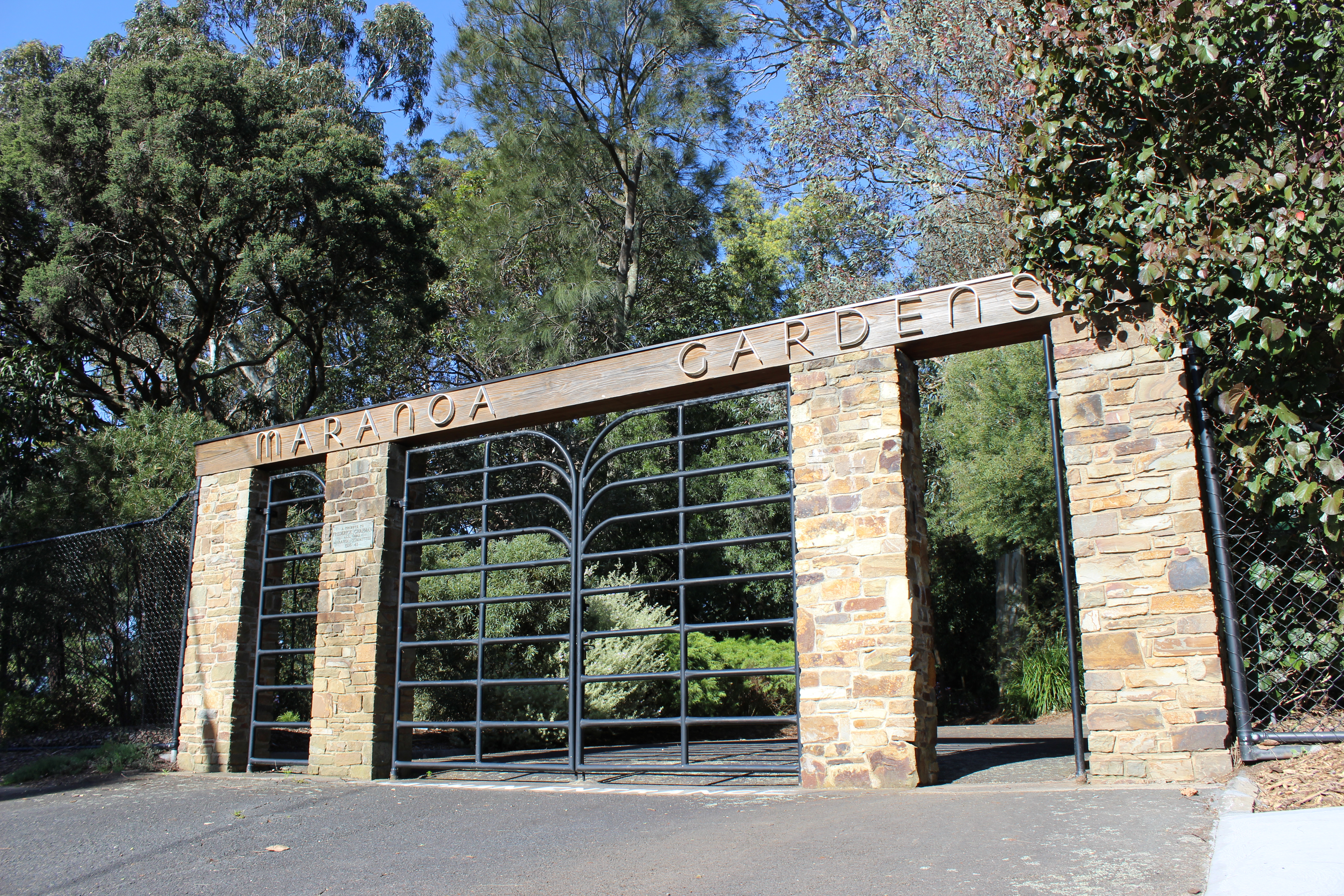
Chapman Entrance gate on Kireep Road, Balwyn, erected in memory of Frederick Chapman, former honorary caretaker of the Gardens

Maranoa Gardens began in the early 1890s, when John Middleton Watson purchased 1.4 hectares (3.5 acres) in Balwyn, a suburb of Melbourne, Australia, for a private garden. Watson planted many Australian and New Zealand native trees and shrubs and the area was maintained purely as a garden. He named the gardens after the Maranoa River in Queensland, from native words meaning "flowing", "alive" or "running".

As a member of the Field Naturalists Club of Victoria, Watson was keenly interested in native and indigenous flora. At the time, native Australian flora was not widely used in gardening; introduced English and other exotic species were used instead.

=== Public gardens ===
The former City of Camberwell (since merged into the City of Boroondara) acquired the area in 1922 and continued the planting, gradually removing all non-native plants.

In September 1926, Maranoa Gardens were formally opened to the public and Frederick Chapman was appointed Chairman of the Gardens' Consulting Committee. Chapman's keen interest in the Gardens as honorary curator and that of many others helped to establish Maranoa Gardens as one of the largest displays of Australian plants in Victoria. The central arboretum and lawn under trees area date from a time just after Watson transferred ownership to Camberwell Council. Some of the older plants include an Angophora costata smooth-barked apple, planted in 1923 and a Stenocarpus sinuatus Queensland firewheel tree, planted in 1924.

Contributors to the Gardens' development were Ivo Hammet (a pioneer of Australian native plant growing), Arthur Swaby (a teacher and botanist, who was a founding member of the Society for Growing Australian Plants), Charles French (an associate of the great botanist, Baron Ferdinand von Mueller) and Earnest Lord. The longest serving head gardener at Maranoa, Mr R Bury (1937–1968), preserved and promoted the Gardens' plants.

=== 1962 renovation ===
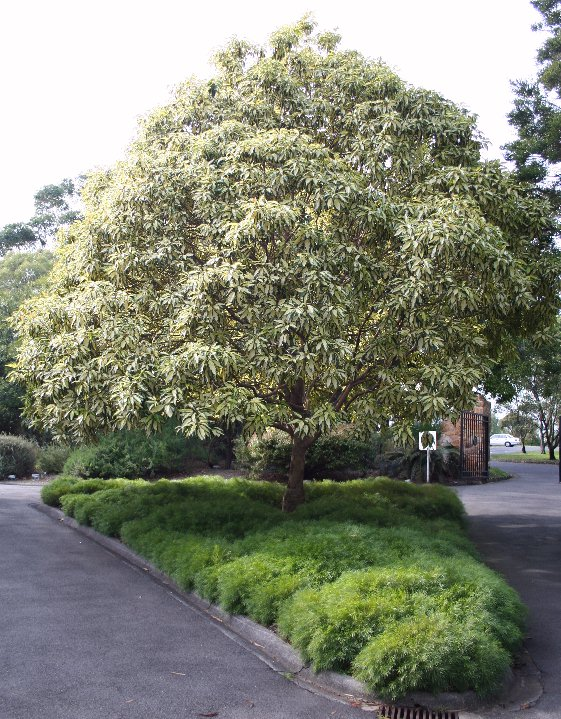
Lophostemon confertus 'Variegatus' underplanted with Acacia cognata 'Limelight' at the main entrance

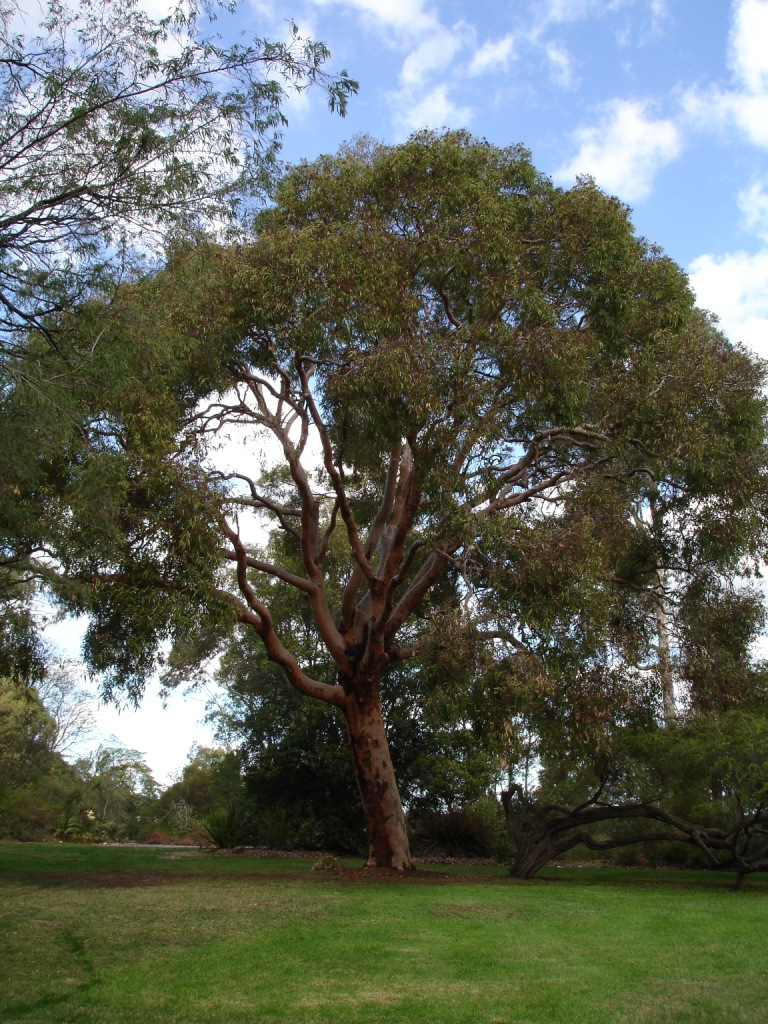
Angophora costata, planted in 1923

In 1962, the original Gardens were doubled in size to 2.6 hectares (6.4 acres) by expanding east into Beckett Park, with the construction of the rockery as the major thrust of this expansion. The variegated Lophostemon confertus was planted near the Beckett Park gates. The temperate woodland/heathland was established in 1986. During 1987, the rockery area was expanded and replanted, the theme of this area being more specific to plants considered more difficult to grow in Melbourne's climate.

=== Subsequent developments ===
Other areas of the gardens have been developed to simulate particular plant communities. In the dry sclerophyll forest on the northern side are shrubs and smaller plants that grow well in dry, shady conditions. On the eastern side is a temperate woodland and heathland developed in 1986. The drainage in this area has been improved and low-growing plants such as Dampiera spp. and prostrate wattles, Acacia spp. are featured.

Improvement of the drainage and mulching with crushed quartz has provided the conditions suitable for many species from Western Australia to thrive. The light grey stony loam over compact mottled clay is poor and the topsoil sets hard when dry while it is soft when wet—and is thus suited to native plants.

With some 5,000 plants, most of which are named, the Victorian branch of the National Trust added the Gardens to a non-statutory list as playing an important part of Australian gardening history.

After being known as "Maranoa Gardens" since its establishment, the word "Botanic" was added to its name in June 2020 by Boroondara City Council.

== Gallery ==
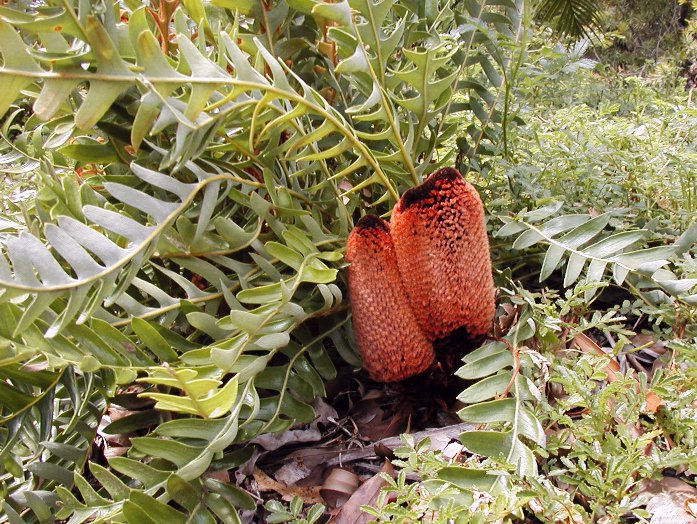
Twin buds of Banksia blechnifolia

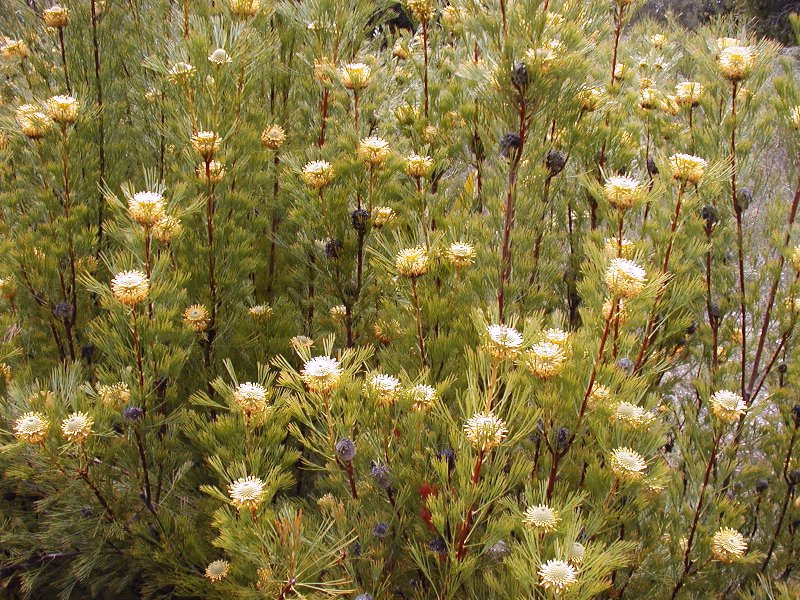
Isopogon anethifolius

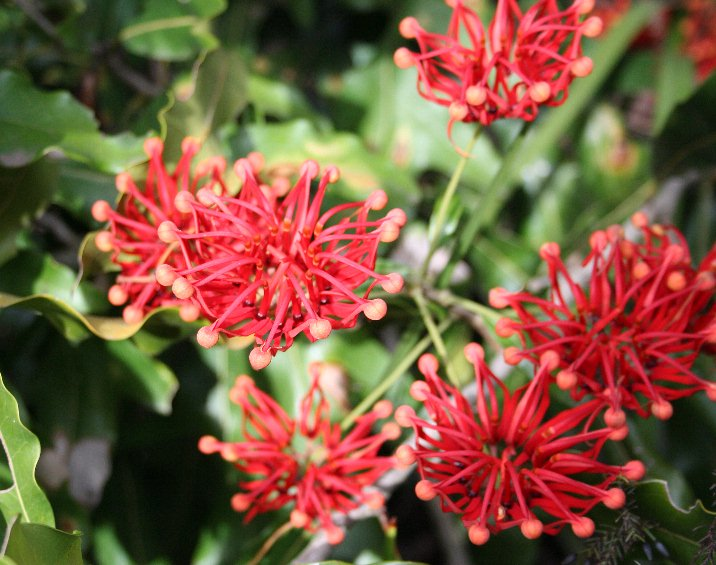
Stenocarpus sinuatus inflorescence

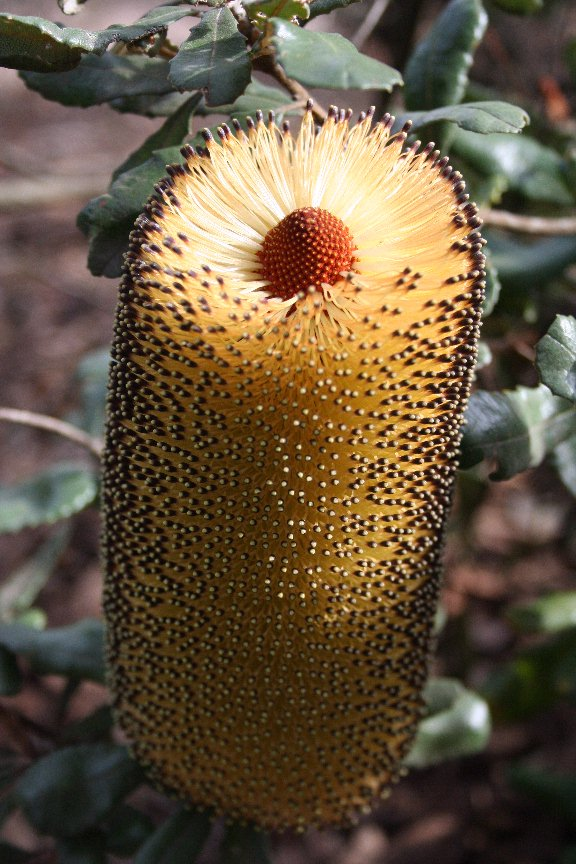
Banksia media inflorescence

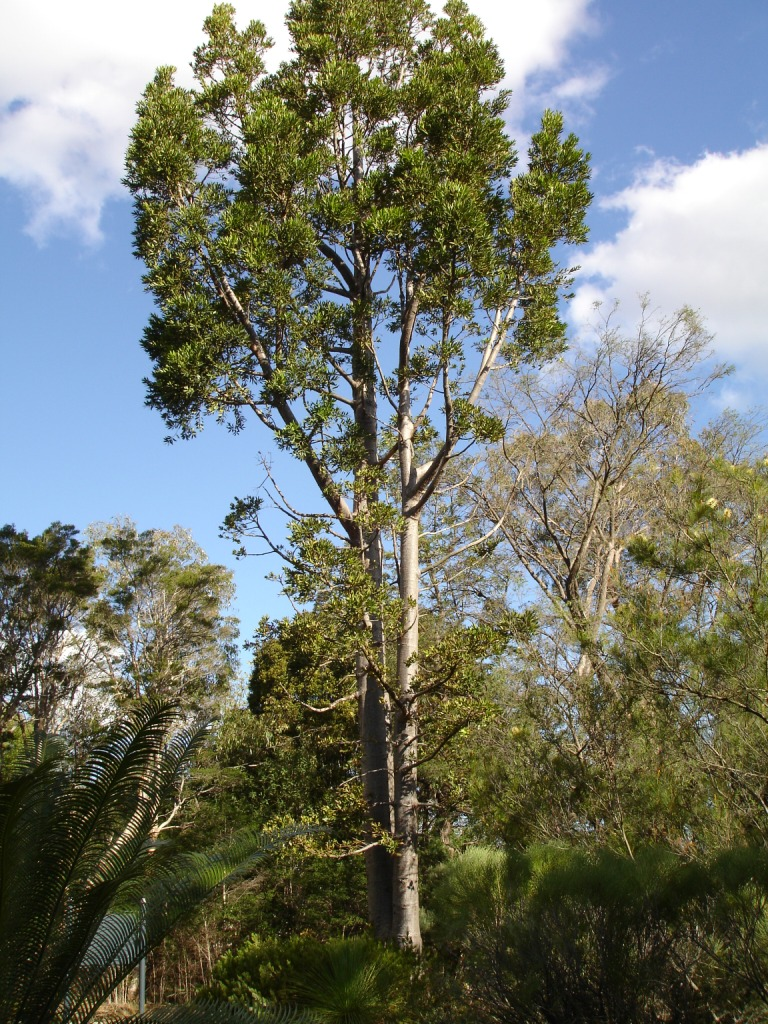
Agathis robusta, Queensland Kauri with Lepidozamia at left

== See also ==
- Parks and gardens of Melbourne
- Heritage gardens in Australia
- List of botanical gardens in Victoria
