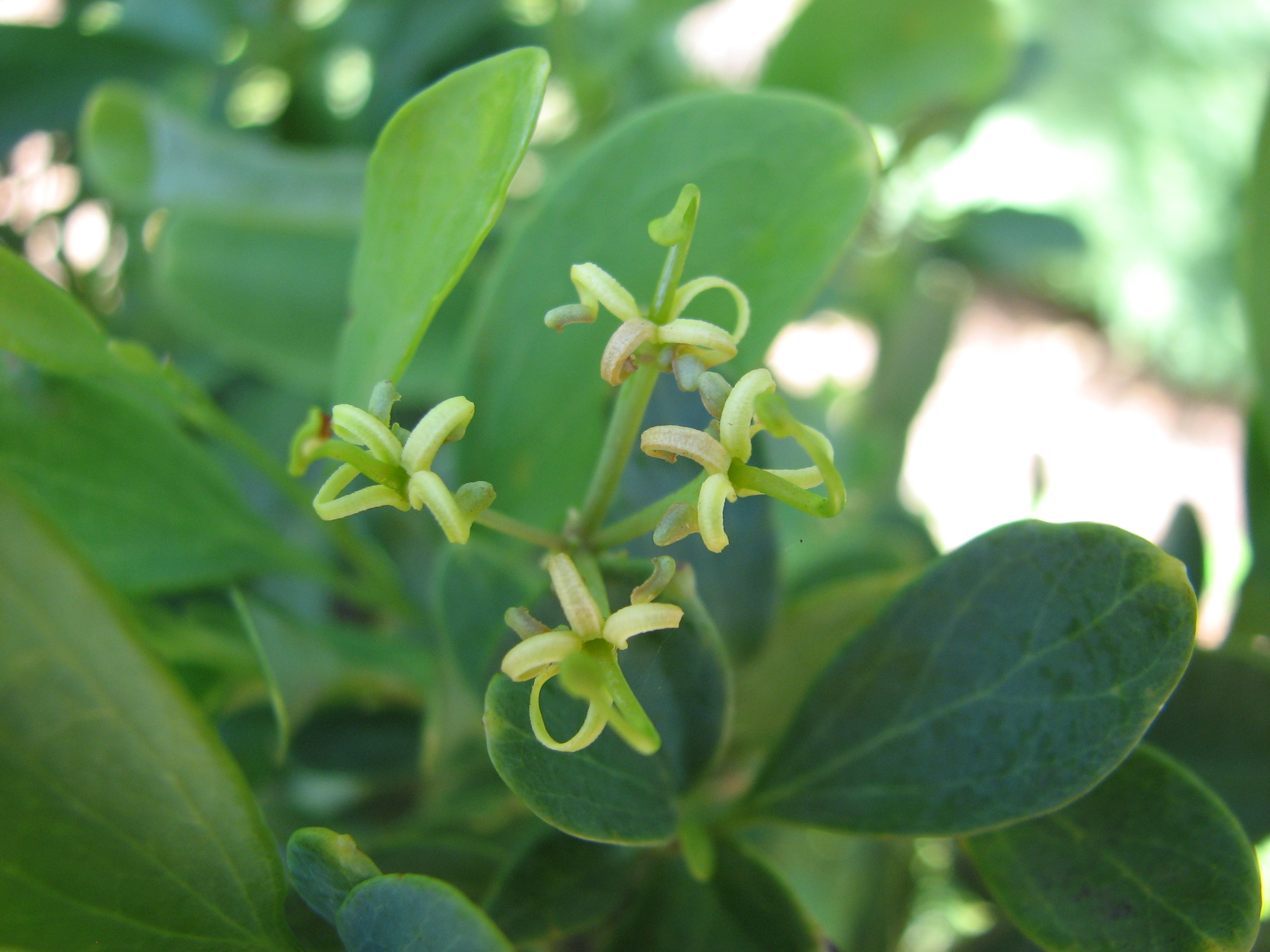

Scientific classification
- Kingdom: Plantae
- Clade: Embryophytes
- Clade: Tracheophytes
- Clade: Spermatophytes
- Clade: Angiosperms
- Clade: Eudicots
- Order: Proteales
- Family: Proteaceae
- Genus: Stenocarpus
- Species: S. umbelliferus

Binomial name
- Stenocarpus umbelliferus ( J.R. Forst. & G.Forst. ) Druce

Synonyms
- Embothrium umbelliferum JR.& G.Forster

= Stenocarpus umbelliferus =

Species of plant endemic to New Caledonia

Stenocarpus umbelliferus is a species of flowering plant in the family Proteaceae. It is endemic to New Caledonia. It has a prostrate or upright habit, growing up to 5 metres (16 ft) in height. Stems are flattened when young, later becoming rounded. The leaves are thick and leathery with a slightly wavy margin. These may be ovate, elliptic, lanceolate or spathulate in shape with petioles that are 3 to 12 mm long. White, cream or pale yellow flowers occur in groups of 3 to 8 per umbel. These are followed by dark-coloured glabrous follicles that are 25 to 80 mm long and 3 to 5 mm wide.

The species was collected by botanist Johann Reinhold Forster and his son Georg Forster during James Cook's second voyage (1772–1775) and formally described by them in 1775.

Two varieties are currently recognised:

- Stenocarpus umbelliferus var. billardieri (Brongn. & Gris) Guillaumin
- Stenocarpus umbelliferus (JR.& G.Forster) Druce var. umbelliferus

The species is common at altitudes between 20 and 1,300 metres (65.6 and 4,270 ft) on the mainland as well as the Isle of Pines.
