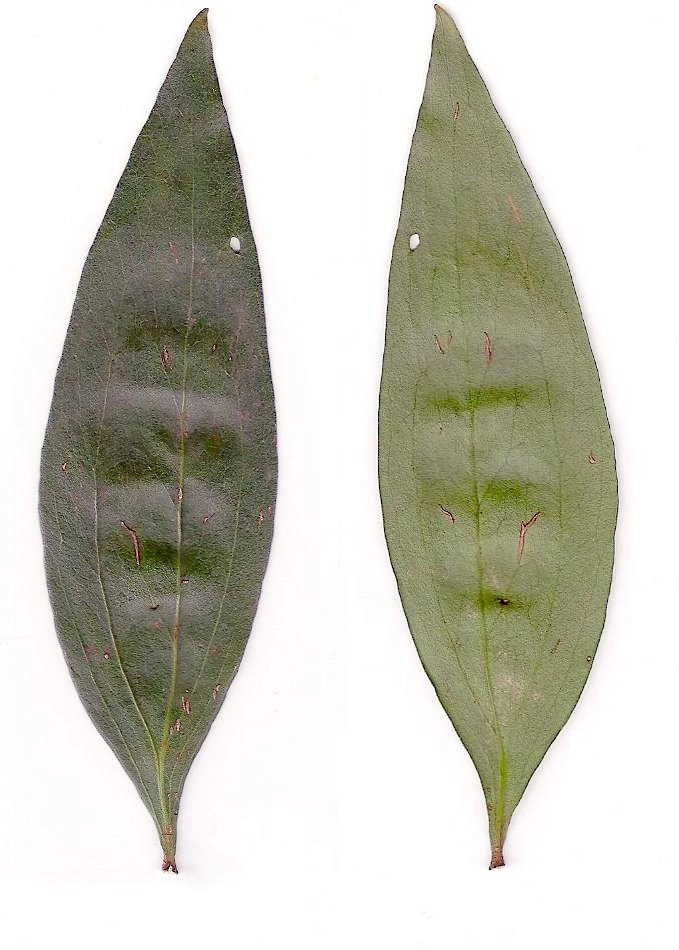
- Leaves, Brisbane Water National Park

Scientific classification
- Kingdom: Plantae
- Clade: Tracheophytes
- Clade: Angiosperms
- Clade: Eudicots
- Order: Proteales
- Family: Proteaceae
- Genus: Stenocarpus
- Species: S. salignus

Binomial name
- Stenocarpus salignus R.Br.

= Stenocarpus salignus =

Scrub beefwood

Species of tree native to Australia

Stenocarpus salignus, known as the scrub beefwood is an Australian rainforest tree in the family Proteaceae. Found in warmer rainforests on the coast and ranges. It is often found in warm temperate rainforest on poorer sedimentary soils, or on volcanic soils above 750 metres (2,460 feet) above sea level. It was originally described by the botanist Robert Brown in 1810.

Stenocarpus salignus is noticeable for the tessellated bark and the sparse foliage high in the canopy. The range of natural distribution is from Kioloa (35° S) near Batemans Bay in south coastal New South Wales, to Rockhampton, Queensland (23° S) in tropical Queensland.

== Description ==
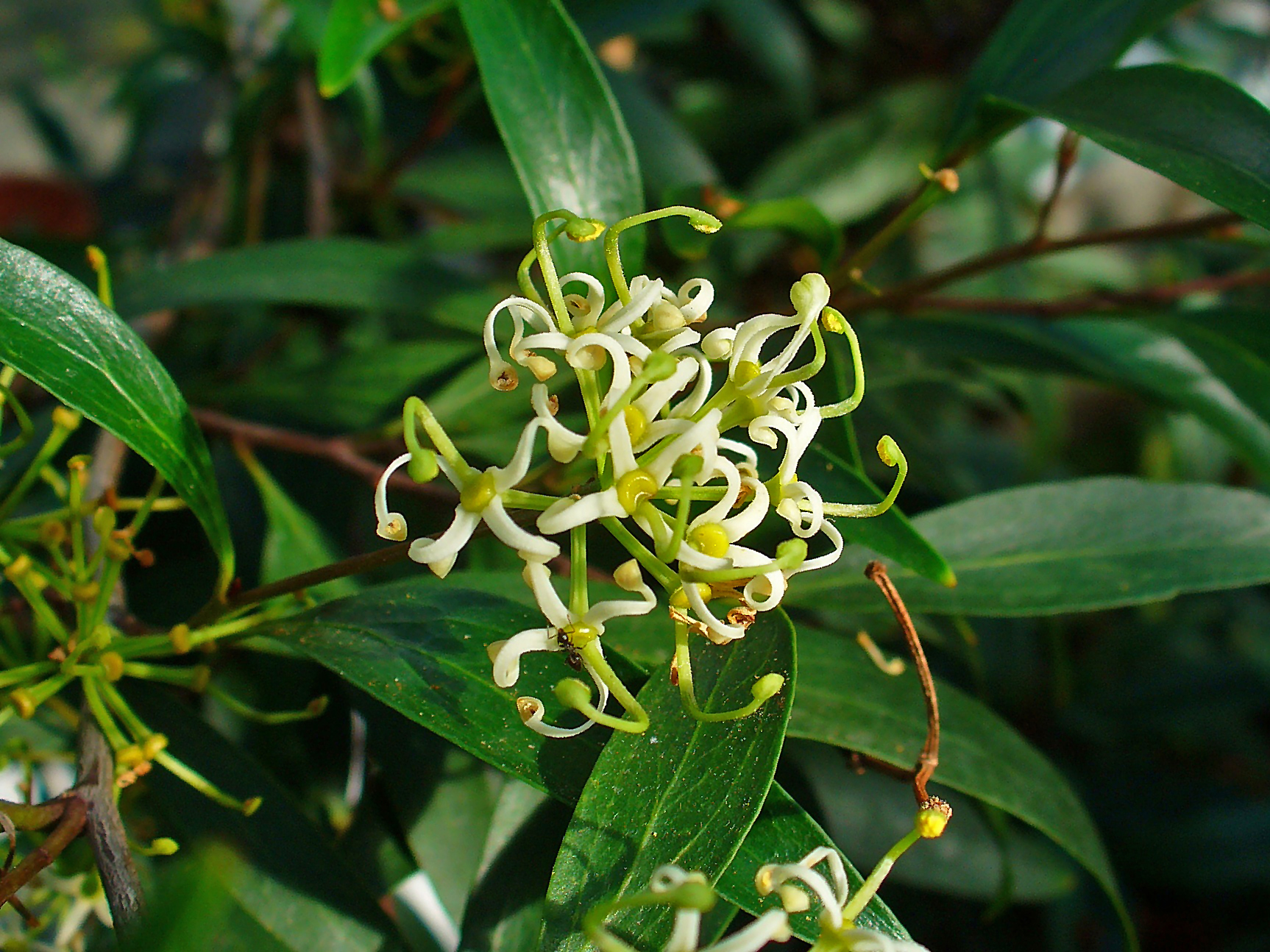
Stenocarpus salignus. Inflorescence

The scrub beefwood is a shrub or small tree, occasionally up to 30 metres (98 feet) tall and 60 cm (24 in) in trunk diameter. The trunk is often irregular and buttressed with dark brown scaly bark.

The leaves are wavy edged, with between one and three main longitudinal veins. Leaves are alternate, simple entire, ovate to lanceolate or elliptic. Leaves have a noticeable hard point, and at the other end they gradually taper to the base. Glossy dark green above, and paler below; 8 to 15 cm (3.1 to 5.9 in) long, 3 to 5 cm (1.2 to 2.0 in) wide. There is considerable variation in leaves of this species.

In October to January, white fragrant flowers form in umbels, similar to the flowers of the related Grevillea. This is followed by the development of the seed pods which are narrow follicles, 5 to 10 cm (2.0 to 3.9 in) long, green initially and maturing to a brown colour. Inside are many thin papery oblong shaped seeds around 12 mm long. Fruit matures from March to June. Fresh seeds germinate rapidly, cuttings also strike well.

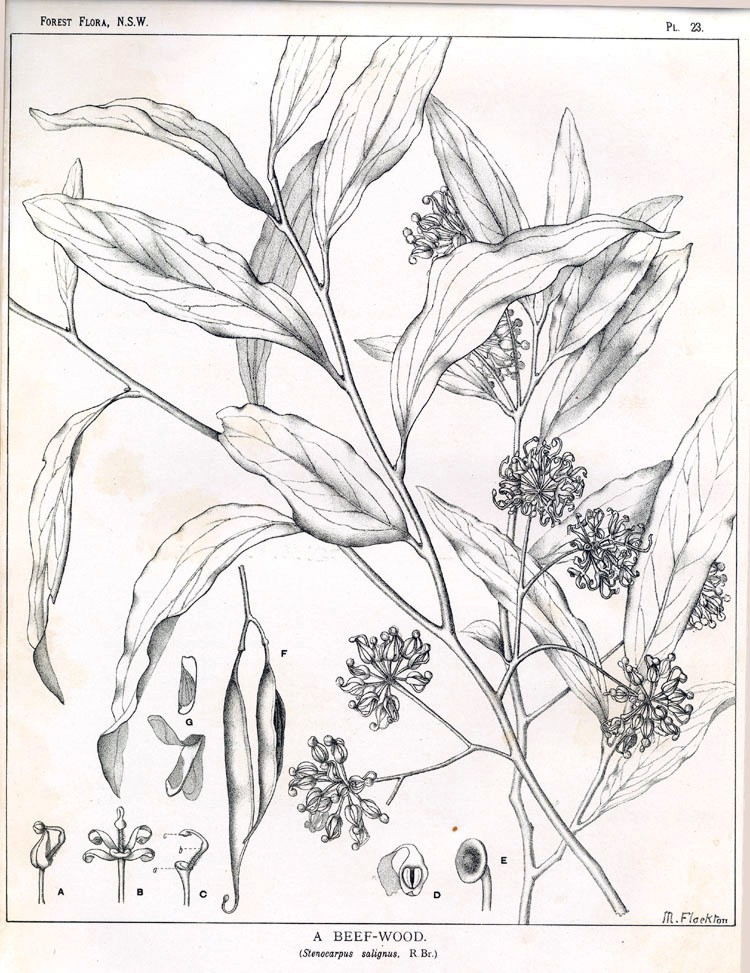
Stenocarpus salignus drawing by Margaret Flockton

== Cultivation ==
This species is sometimes seen in specialist native nurseries in Eastern Australia; it grows well in part shade on well drained mildly acidic soils. It is less commonly grown than its better known relative S. sinuatus.
