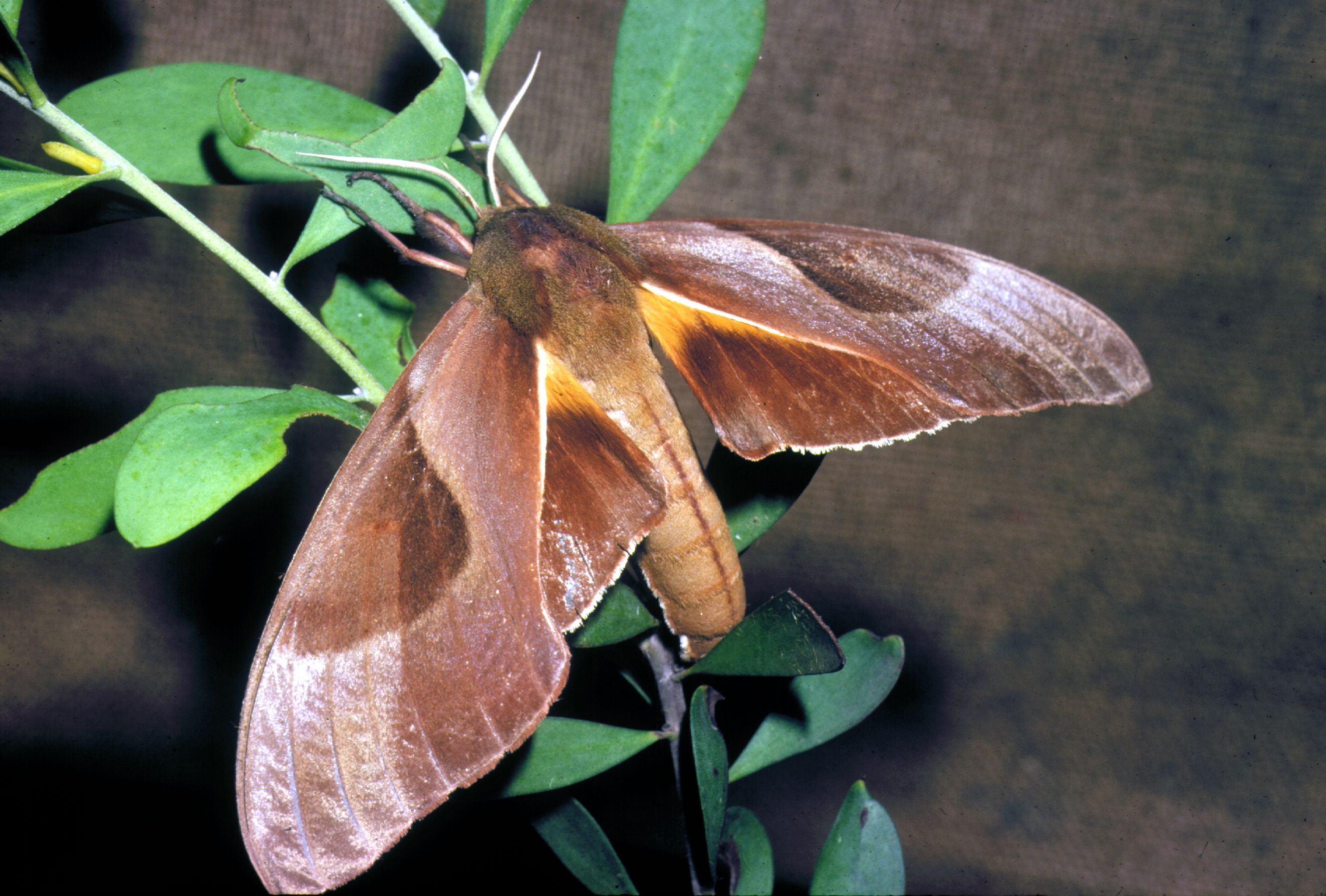

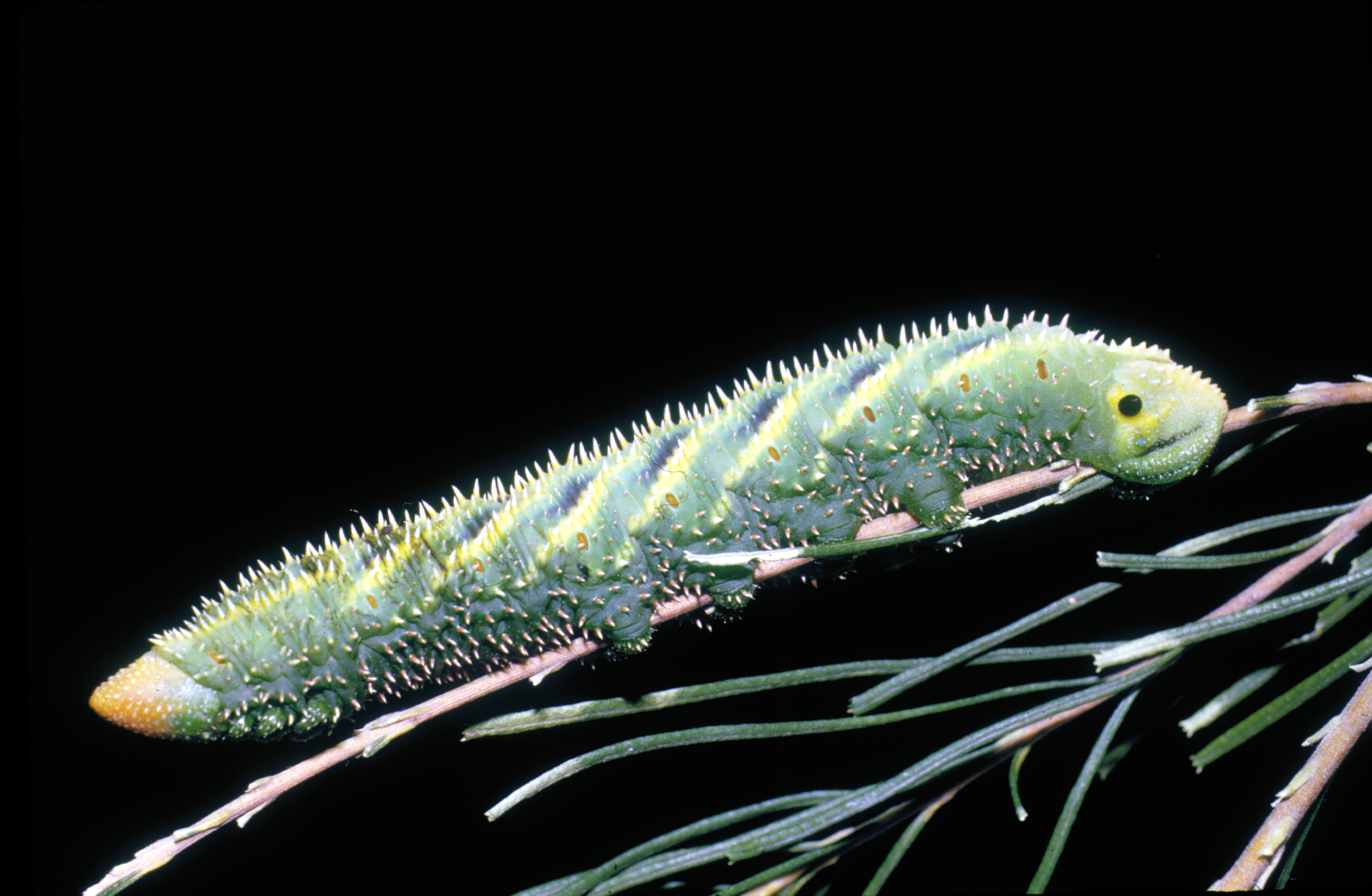

Scientific classification
- Kingdom: Animalia
- Phylum: Arthropoda
- Class: Insecta
- Order: Lepidoptera
- Family: Sphingidae
- Genus: Coequosa
- Species: C. triangularis

Binomial name
- Coequosa triangularis (Donovan, 1805)

Synonyms
- Sphinx triangularis Donovan, 1805; Sphynx castaneus Perry, 1811

= Coequosa triangularis =

Species of moth

Coequosa triangularis, the double-headed hawk moth, is a moth of the family Sphingidae.

== Distribution ==
It is known from the Australian states of New South Wales and Queensland.

== Description ==
The species was first described by Edward Donovan in 1805. The wingspan is about 130 mm, making it Australia's largest hawk moth. Adults are yellow and brown with broad wavy markings.

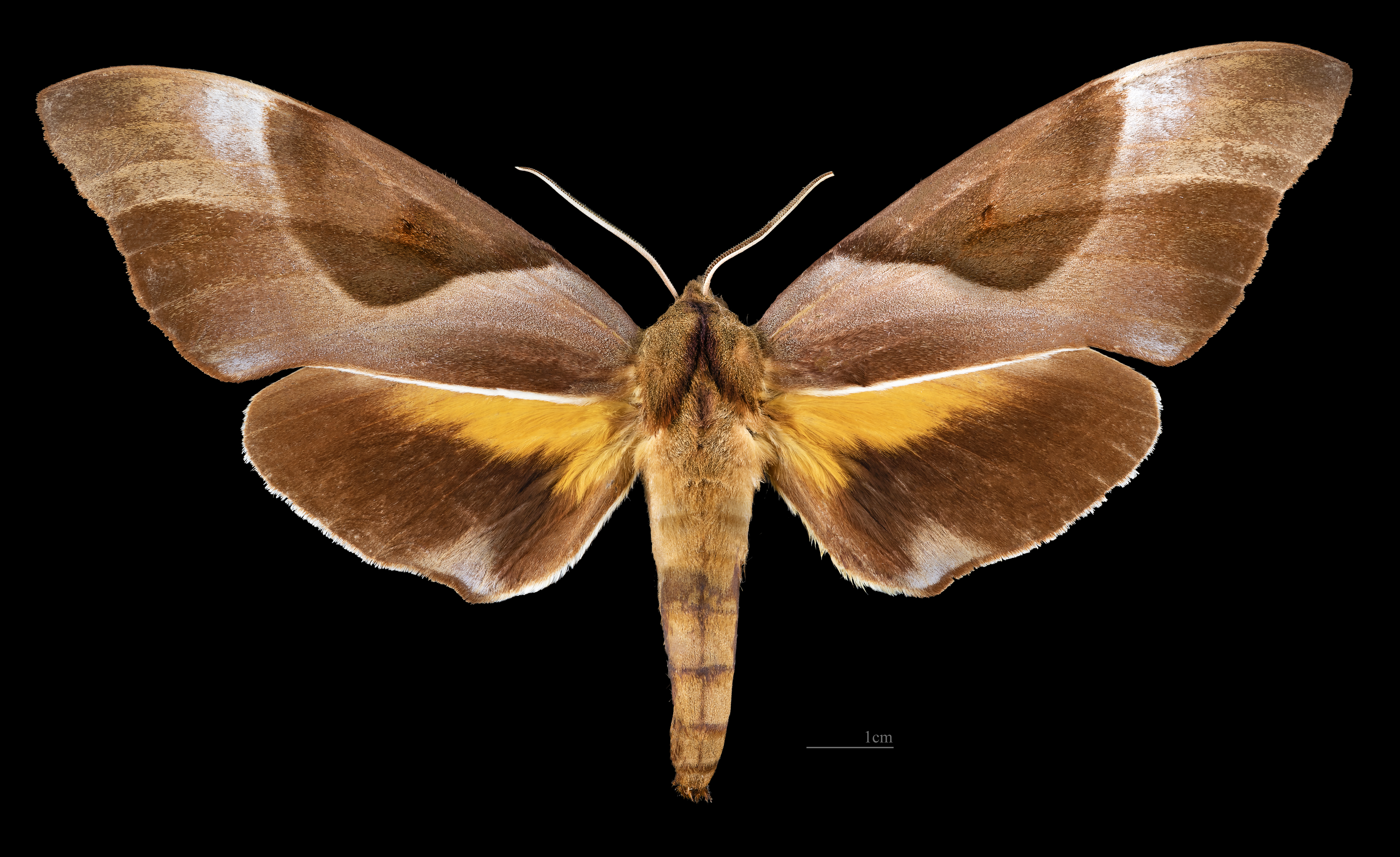
Male dorsal

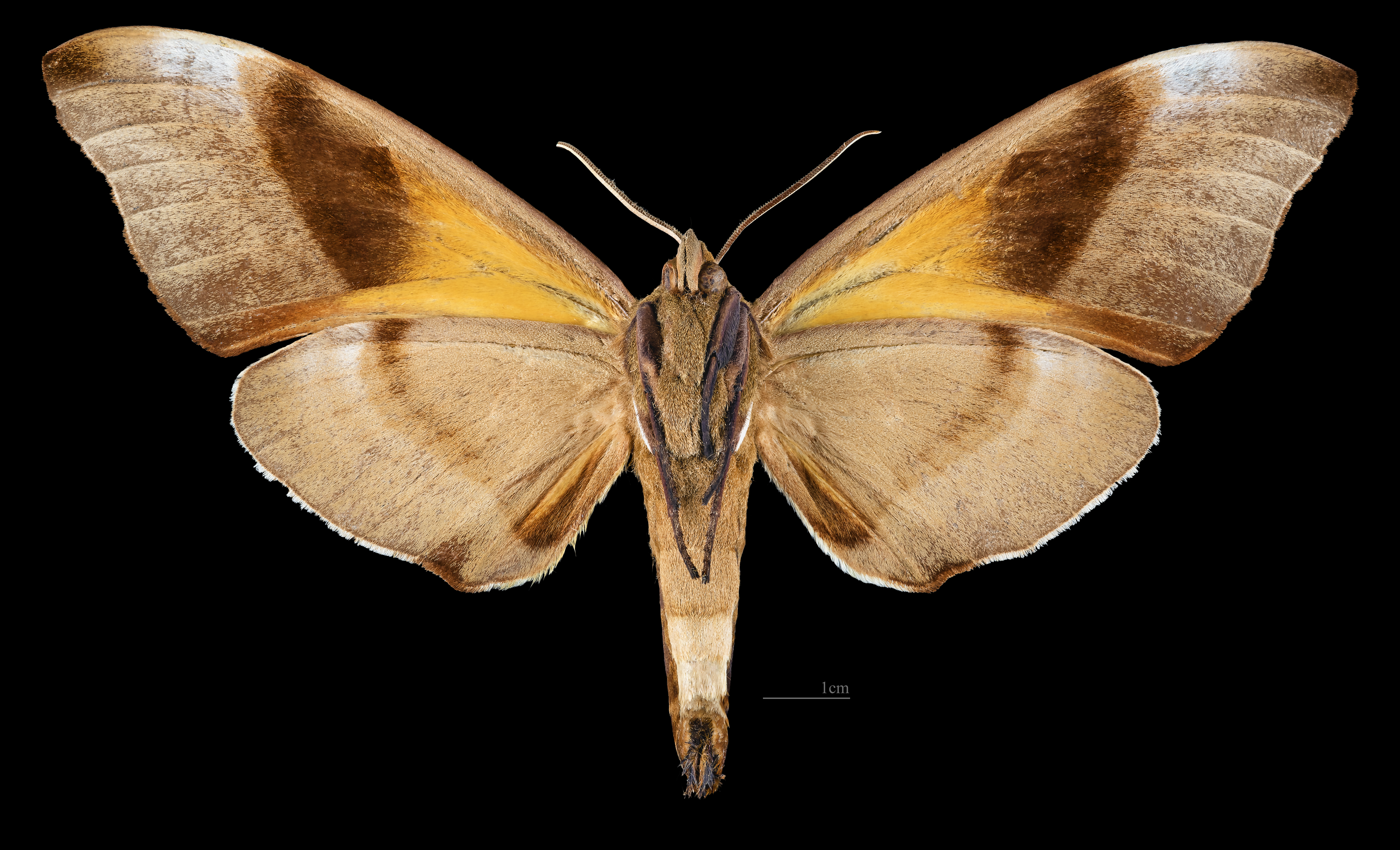
Male ventral

== Biology ==
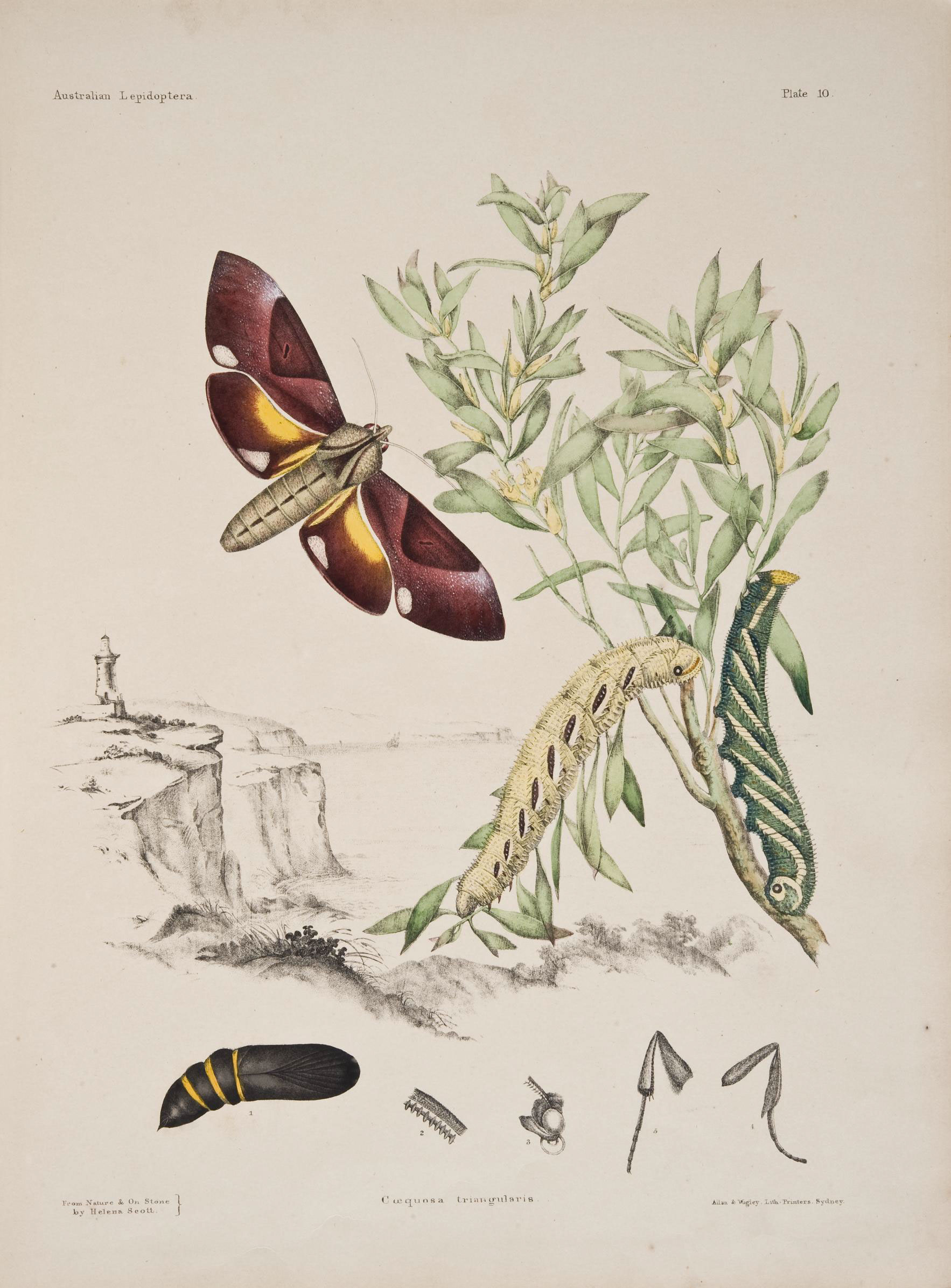
Illustration of moth lifestages and host species Persoonia lanceolata.

The larvae feed on Banksia ericifolia, Grevillea robusta, Hakea dactyloides, Macadamia integrifolia, Persoonia levis and Stenocarpus sinuatus. Full-grown larvae are about 100 mm long.
