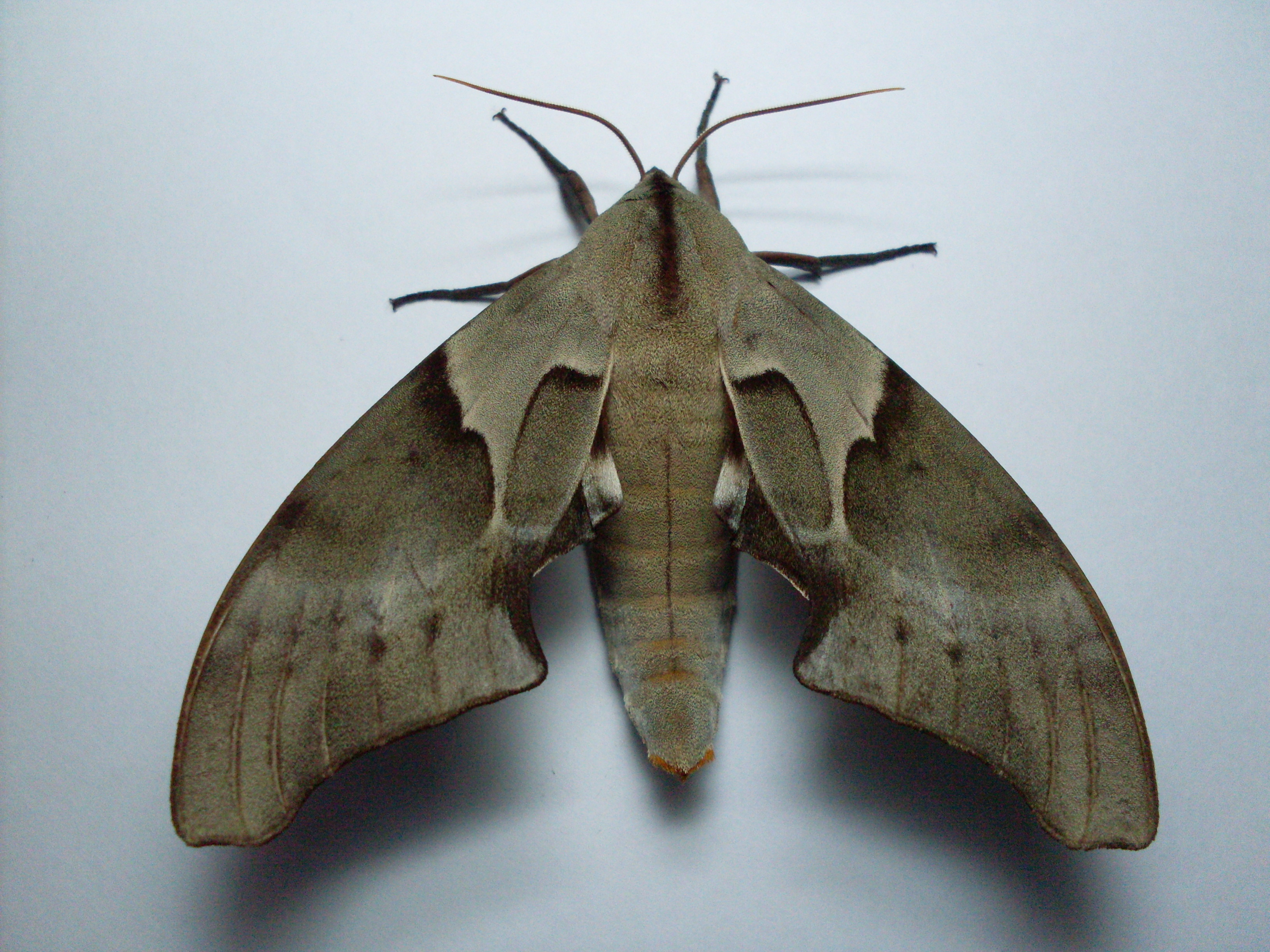

Scientific classification
- Domain: Eukaryota
- Kingdom: Animalia
- Phylum: Arthropoda
- Class: Insecta
- Order: Lepidoptera
- Family: Sphingidae
- Genus: Coequosa
- Species: C. australasiae

Binomial name
- Coequosa australasiae (Donovan, 1805)

Synonyms
- Sphinx australasiae Donovan, 1805; Brachyglossa banksiae Boisduval, 1875

= Coequosa australasiae =

Species of moth

Coequosa australasiae is a species of moth of the family Sphingidae.

== Distribution ==
It is known from New South Wales, the Northern Territory, Queensland and Victoria.

== Description ==
The wingspan is about 120 mm.

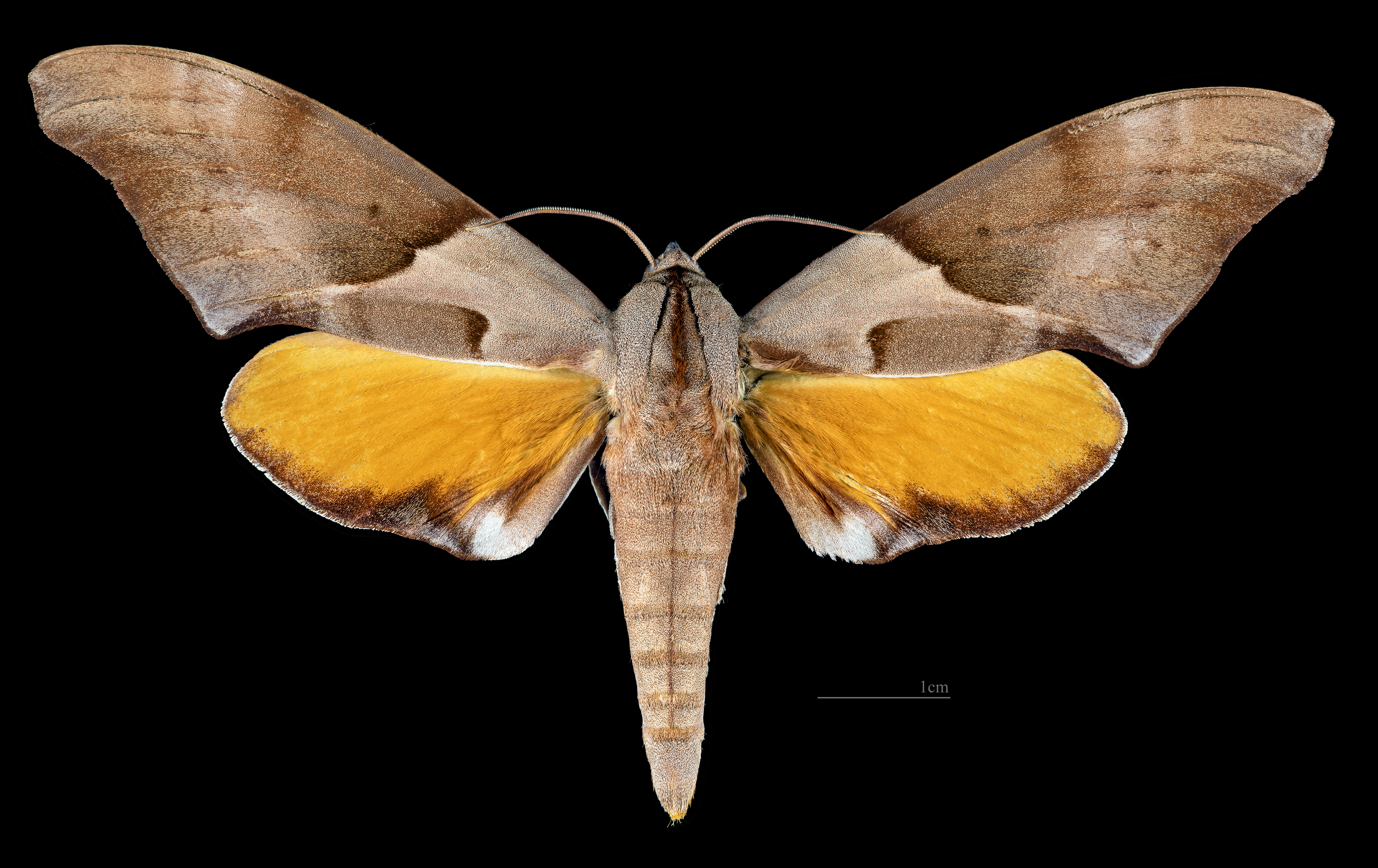
Male dorsal

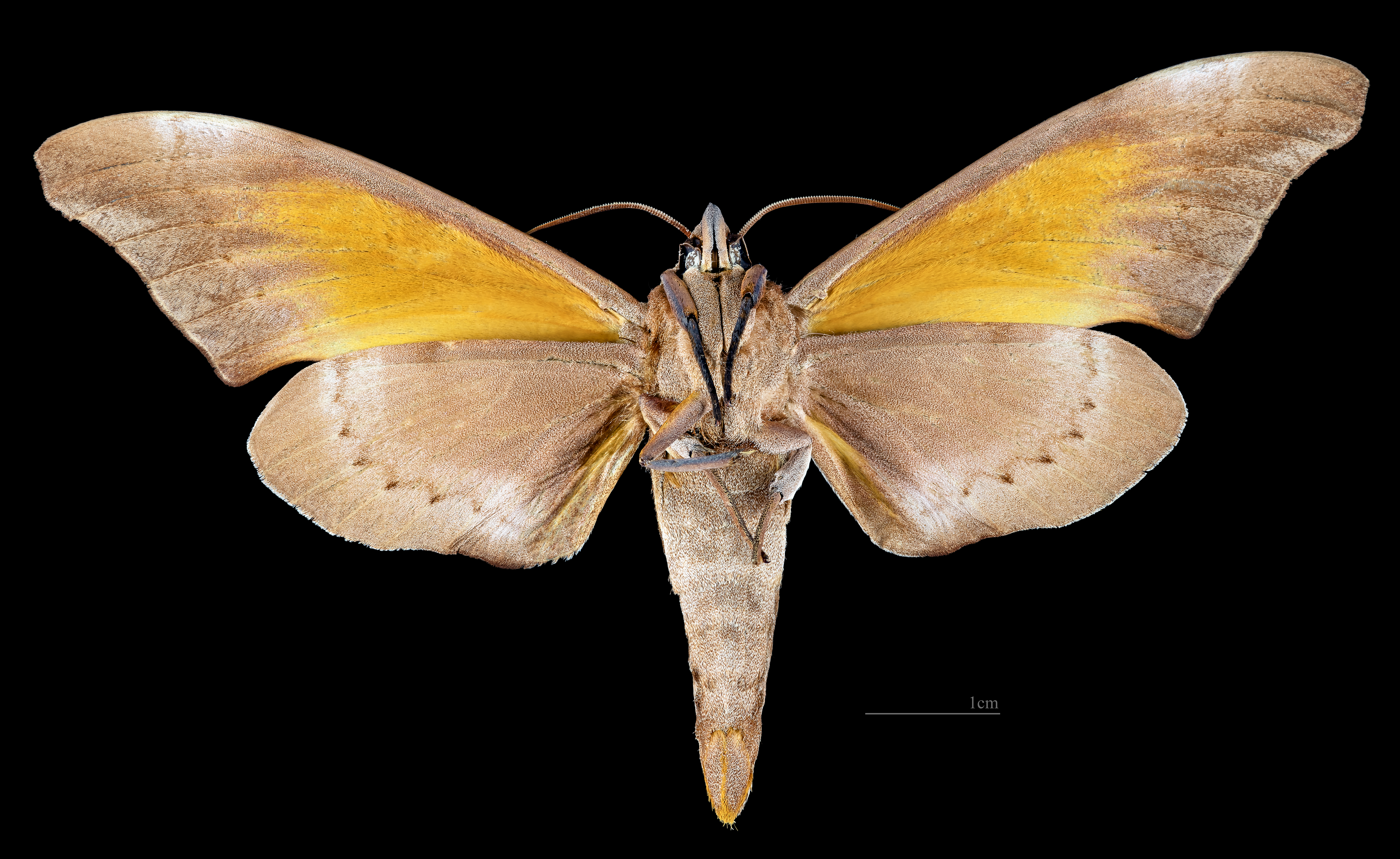
Male ventral

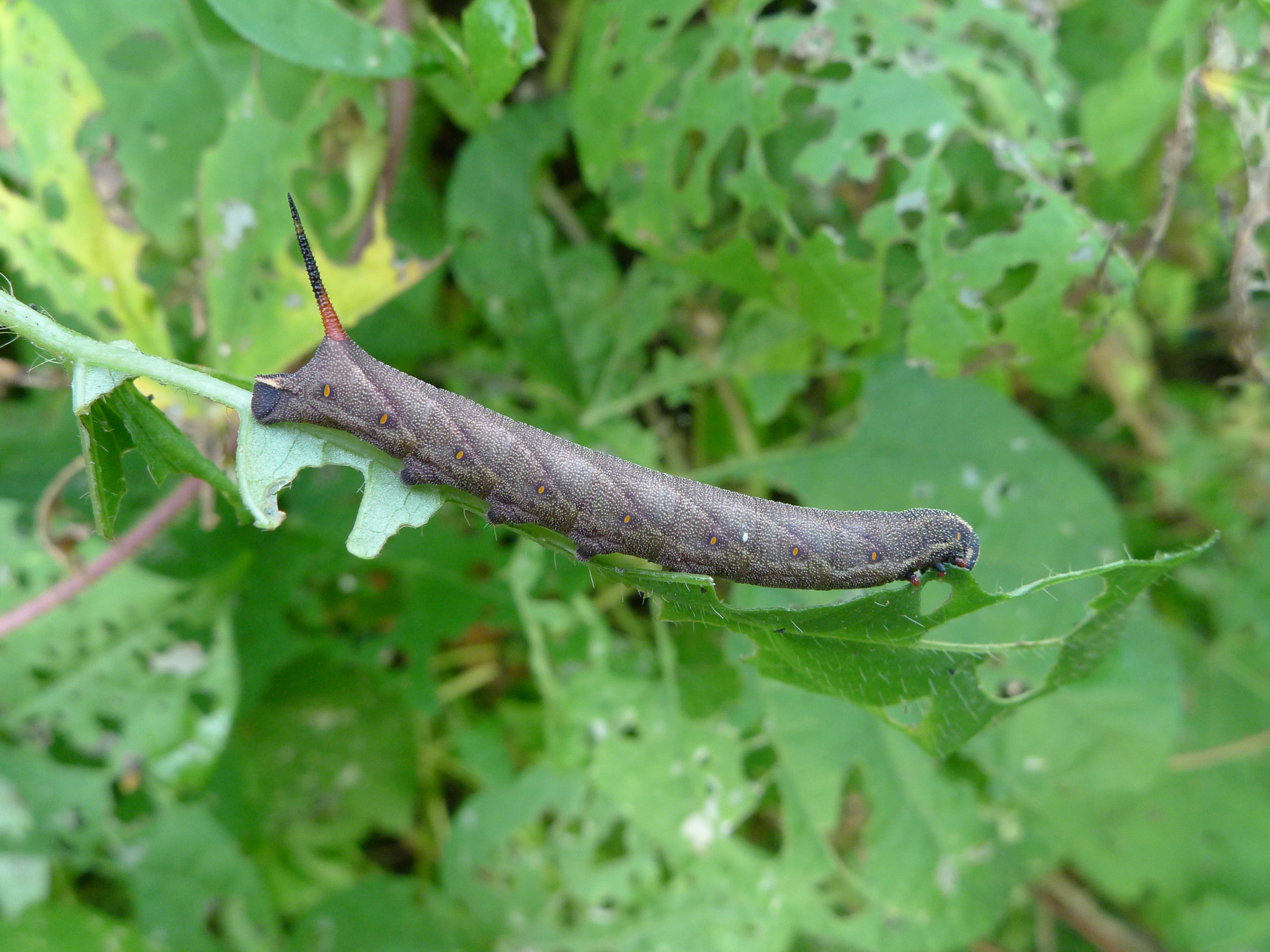
Caterpillar
