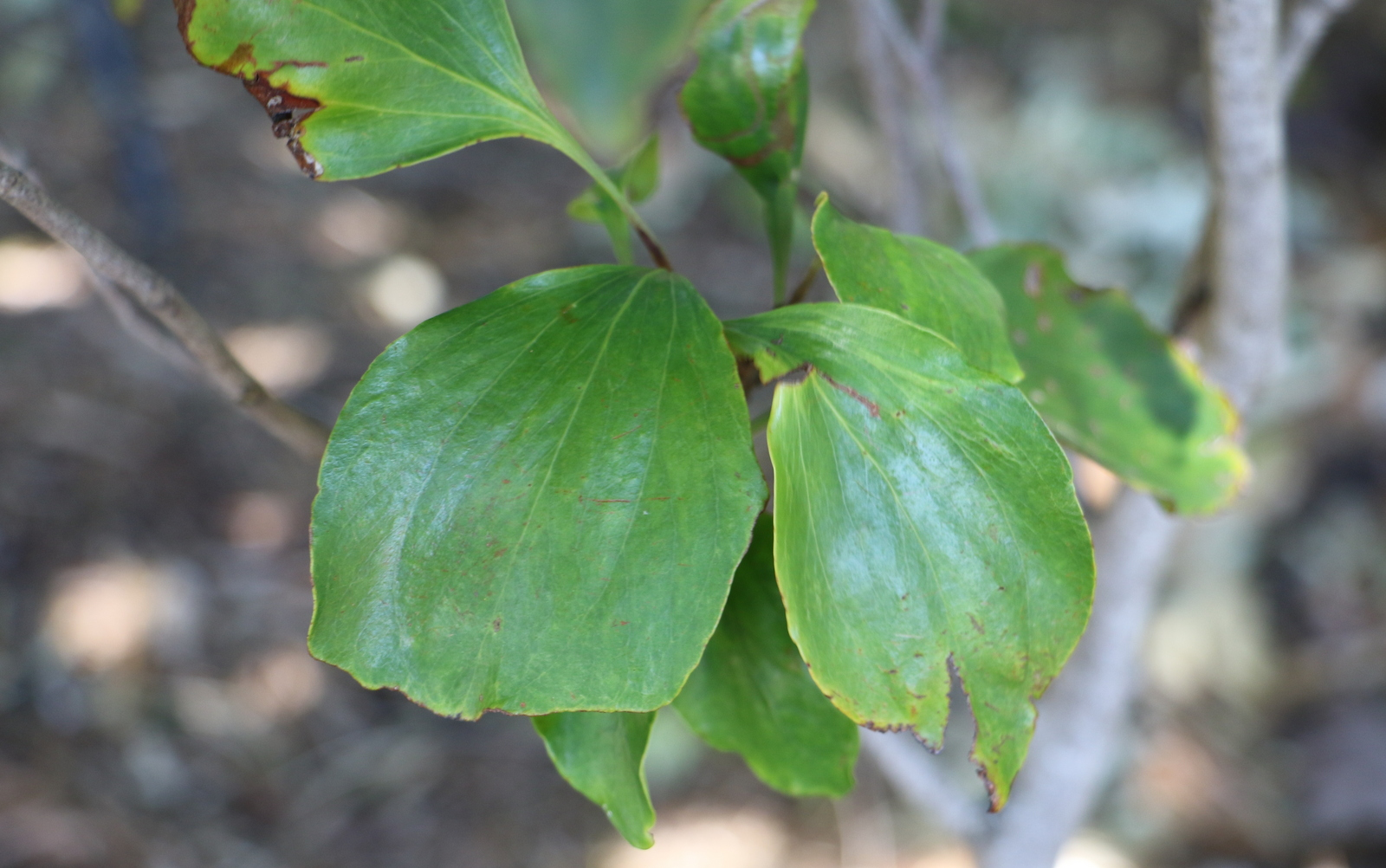

Scientific classification
- Kingdom: Plantae
- Clade: Embryophytes
- Clade: Tracheophytes
- Clade: Spermatophytes
- Clade: Angiosperms
- Clade: Eudicots
- Order: Proteales
- Family: Proteaceae
- Genus: Stenocarpus
- Species: S. trinervis

Binomial name
- Stenocarpus trinervis Andre Guillaumin

= Stenocarpus trinervis =

Species of tree endemic to New Caledonia

Stenocarpus trinervis is a species of rainforest tree in the family Proteaceae, endemic to New Caledonia. It may grow to 20 metres (66 ft) in height. The timber is beautifully marked, suited to cabinet making.
