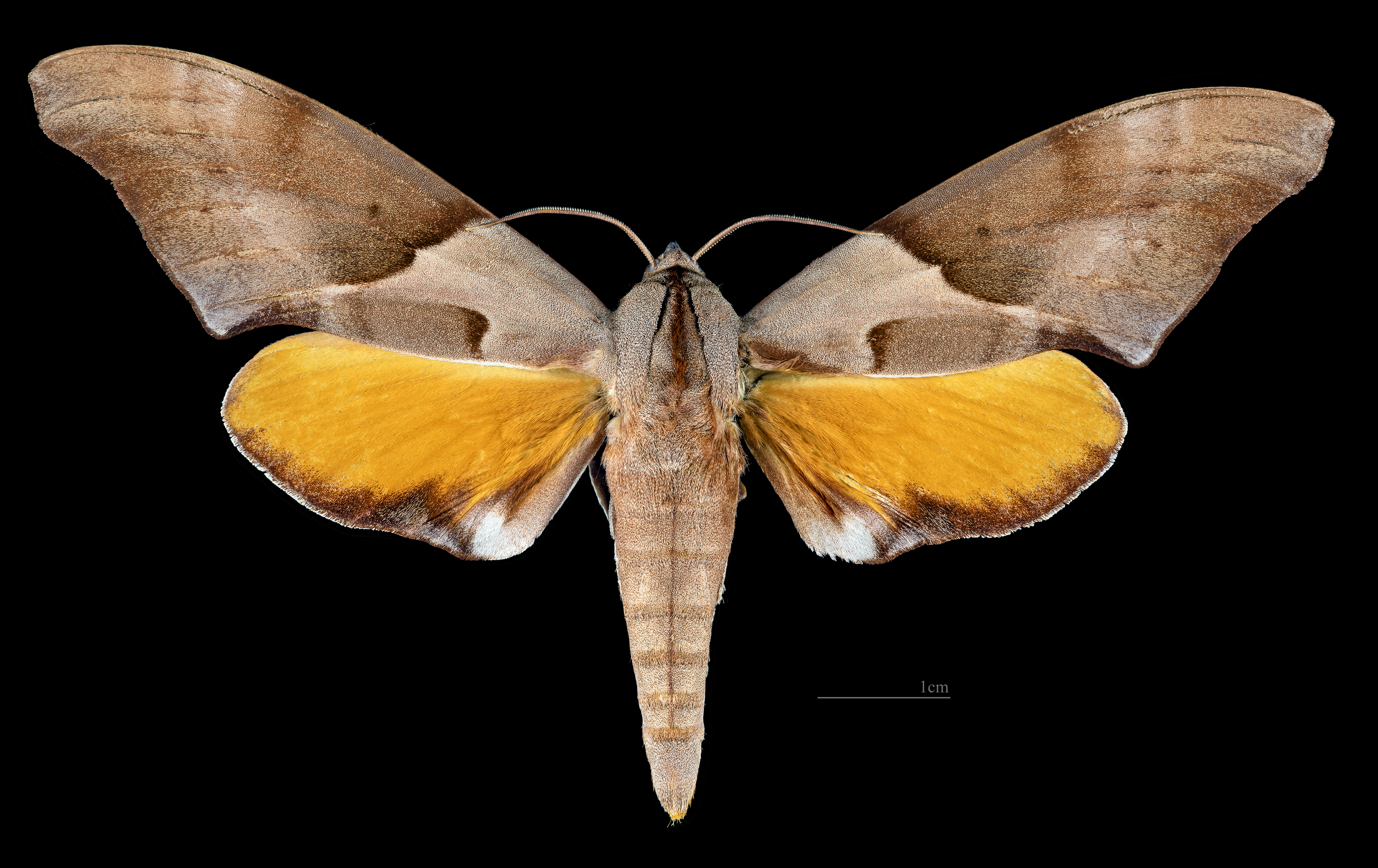
- Coequosa australasiae

Scientific classification
- Domain: Eukaryota
- Kingdom: Animalia
- Phylum: Arthropoda
- Class: Insecta
- Order: Lepidoptera
- Family: Sphingidae
- Tribe: Smerinthini
- Genus: Coequosa; Walker, 1856

Synonyms
- Metamimas Butler, 1876

= Coequosa =

Genus of moths

Coequosa is a genus of moths in the family Sphingidae first described by Francis Walker in 1856.

== Species ==
- Coequosa australasiae (Donovan, 1805)
- Coequosa triangularis (Donovan, 1805)
