= Stenocarpus heterophyllus =

Conservation status
- Endangered (IUCN 3.1)

Scientific classification
- Kingdom: Plantae
- Clade: Tracheophytes
- Clade: Angiosperms
- Clade: Eudicots
- Order: Proteales
- Family: Proteaceae
- Genus: Stenocarpus
- Species: S. heterophyllus

Binomial name
- Stenocarpus heterophyllus Brong. & Gris

Species of plant endemic to New Caledonia

Stenocarpus heterophyllus is a species of plant in the family Proteaceae. It is endemic to New Caledonia. It is threatened by habitat loss.
