= Stenocarpus villosus =

Conservation status
- Endangered (IUCN 3.1)

Scientific classification
- Kingdom: Plantae
- Clade: Embryophytes
- Clade: Tracheophytes
- Clade: Spermatophytes
- Clade: Angiosperms
- Clade: Eudicots
- Order: Proteales
- Family: Proteaceae
- Genus: Stenocarpus
- Species: S. villosus

Binomial name
- Stenocarpus villosus Brongn. & Gris

Species of plant endemic to New Caledonia

Stenocarpus villosus is a species of plant in the family Proteaceae. It is endemic to New Caledonia. It is threatened by habitat loss.
