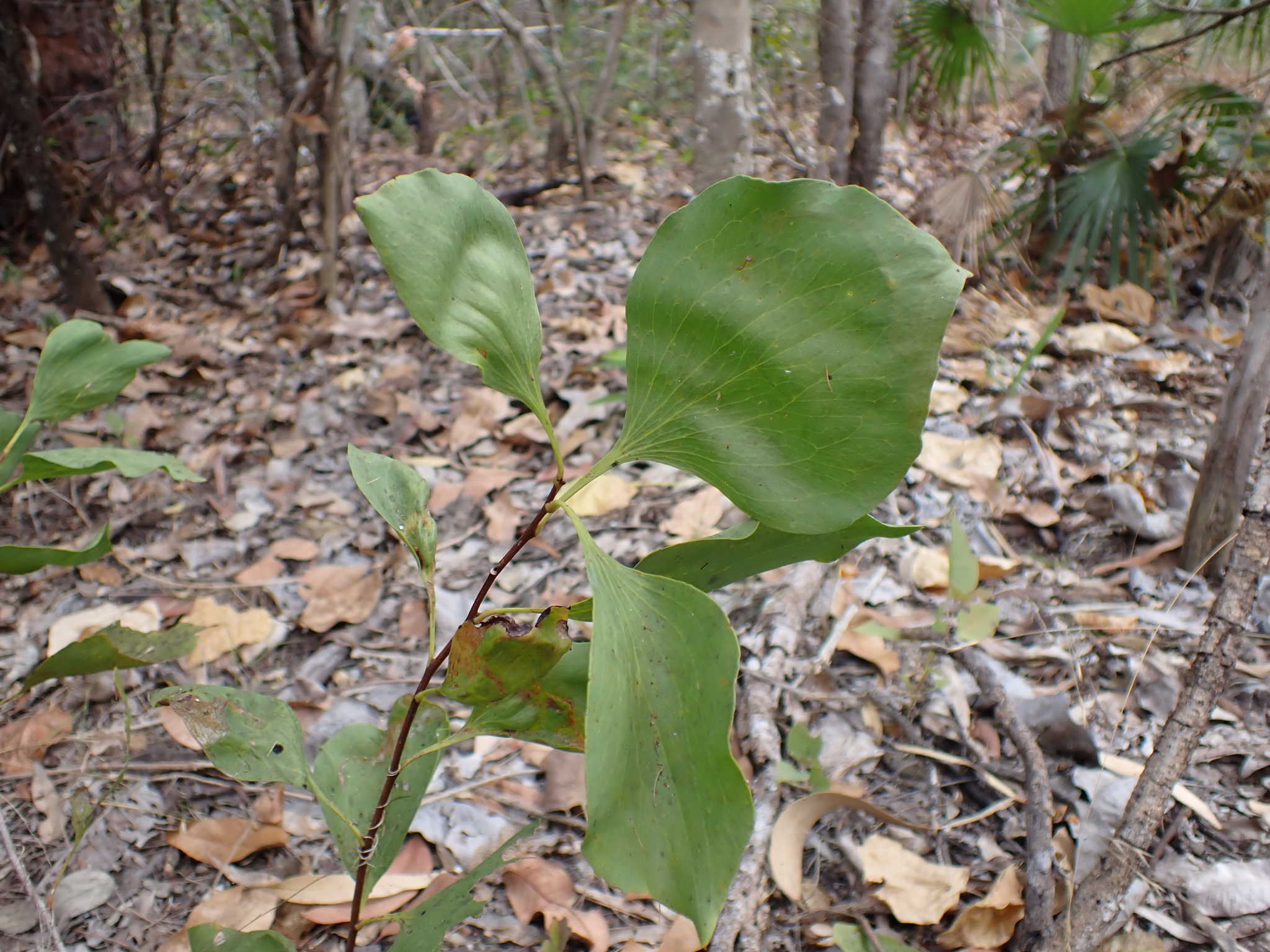
- Juvenile leaves

Scientific classification
- Kingdom: Plantae
- Clade: Embryophytes
- Clade: Tracheophytes
- Clade: Spermatophytes
- Clade: Angiosperms
- Clade: Eudicots
- Order: Proteales
- Family: Proteaceae
- Genus: Stenocarpus
- Species: S. acacioides

Binomial name
- Stenocarpus acacioides F.Muell.

Synonyms
- Stenocarpus salignus var. acacioides (F.Muell.) Domin; Stenocarpus sp. A Kimberley Flora (I.D.Cowie 1932)

= Stenocarpus acacioides =

Species of tree

Stenocarpus acacioides is a species of flowering plant in the family Proteaceae and is endemic to north-western Australia. It is a shrub or tree with elliptic leaves and groups of white flowers and woody, linear follicles.

== Description ==
Stenocarpus acacioides is a shrub or tree that typically grows to a height of 1.3–4 m (4 ft 3 in – 13 ft 1 in), sometimes to 12 m (39 ft), and is glabrous apart from woolly, rust-coloured hairs on new flower buds. The adult leaves are elliptic, 45–115 mm (1.8–4.5 in) long and 7–30 mm (0.28–1.18 in) wide on a petiole 5–20 mm (0.20–0.79 in) long. Juvenile leaves are egg-shaped, longer and wider than adult leaves. The flower groups are arranged in leaf axils, either singly, in pairs or threes, the groups with 19 to 22 flowers on a peduncle 7–35 mm (0.28–1.38 in) long. Each flower in the group is white, on a pedicel 6–10 mm (0.24–0.39 in) long. Flowering occurs from April to October and the fruit is a woody, linear follicle 55–150 mm (2.2–5.9 in) long, containing winged seeds about 9 mm (0.35 in) long.

== Taxonomy ==
Stenocarpus acacioides was first formally described in 1859 by Ferdinand von Mueller in Fragmenta Phytographiae Australiae from specimens collected near the Roper River. The specific epithet (acacioides) means "Acacia-like".

== Distribution and habitat ==
This species usually grows in woodland and occurs from the Kimberley region of Western Australia to the northern parts of the Northern Territory.
