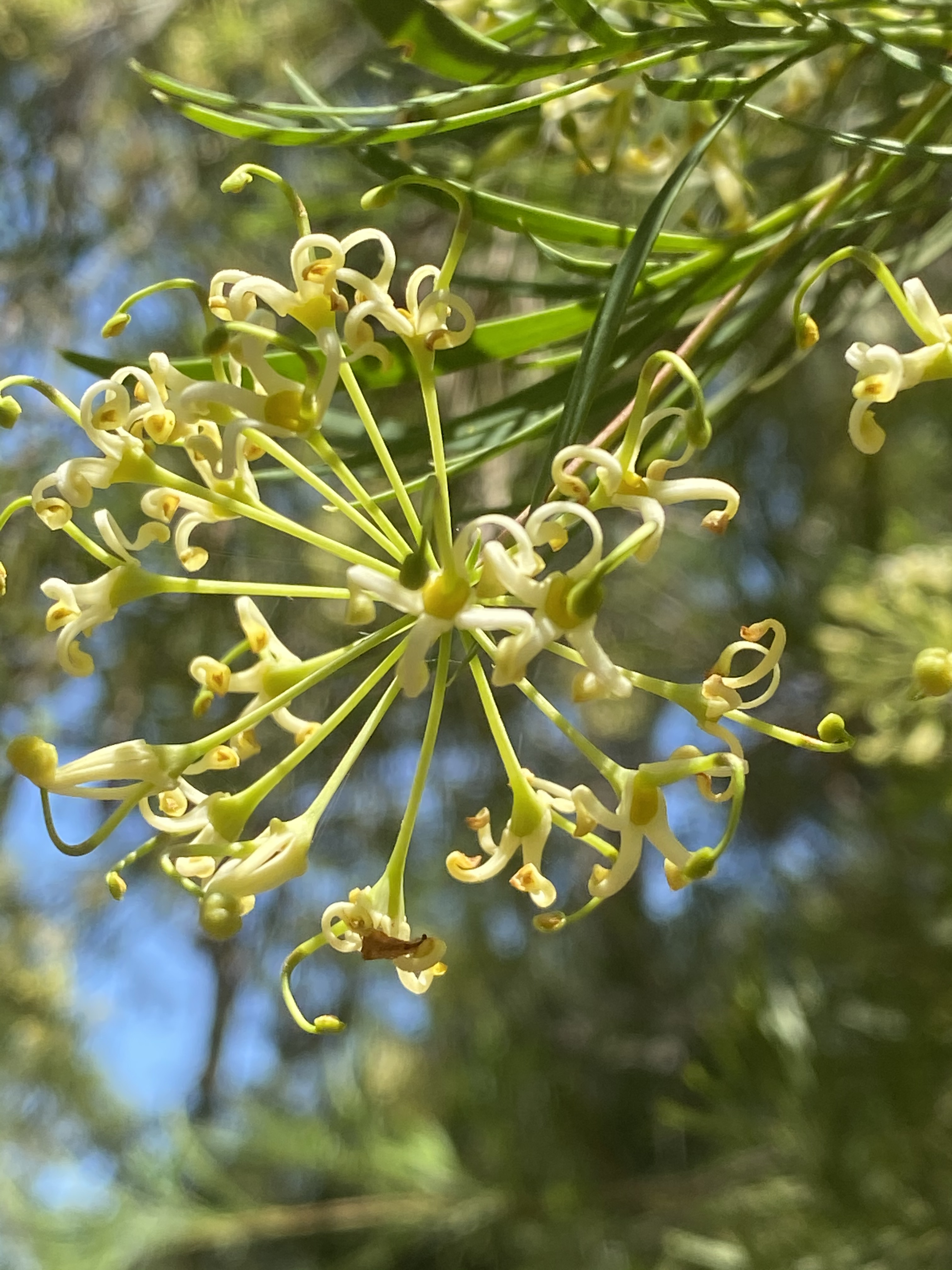
- Flowers

Scientific classification
- Kingdom: Plantae
- Clade: Embryophytes
- Clade: Tracheophytes
- Clade: Spermatophytes
- Clade: Angiosperms
- Clade: Eudicots
- Order: Proteales
- Family: Proteaceae
- Genus: Stenocarpus
- Species: S. angustifolius

Binomial name
- Stenocarpus angustifolius C.T.White

= Stenocarpus angustifolius =

Species of tree native to Queensland, Australia

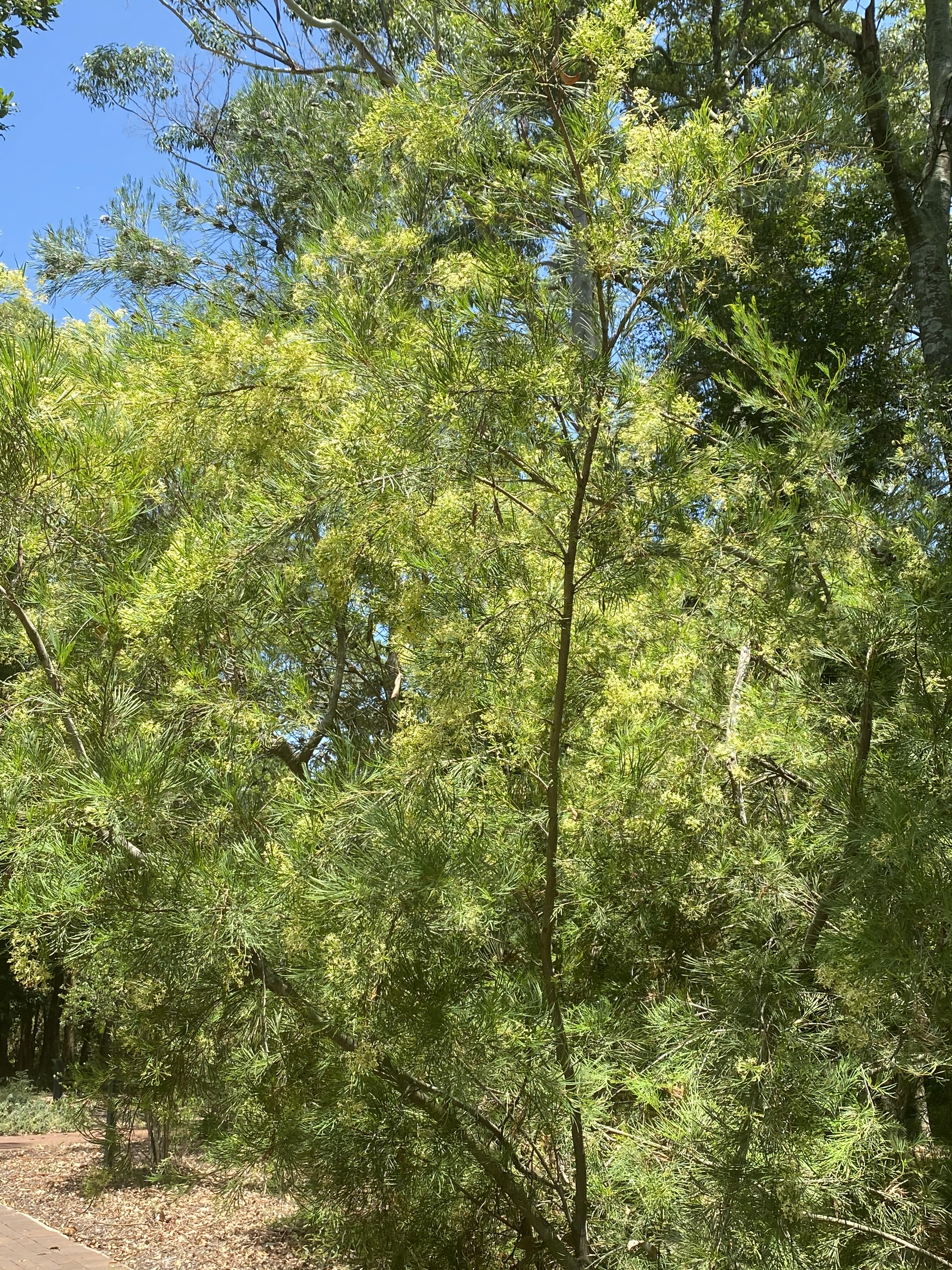
Habit

Stenocarpus angustifolius is a species of flowering plant in the family Proteaceae and is endemic to Queensland. It is a shrub or small tree with narrow lance-shaped adult leaves, groups of creamy white flowers and cylindrical follicles.

== Description ==
Stenocarpus angustifolius is a shrub or small tree that typically grows to a height of 4–5 m (13–16 ft) and has minutely hairy young branchlets that soon become glabrous. The adult leaves are narrow lance-shaped, 50–180 mm (2.0–7.1 in) long and up to 12 mm (0.47 in) wide on a petiole up to 10 mm (0.39 in) long. Juvenile leaves are deeply divided with narrow linear lobes. The flower groups are arranged in leaf axils with 12 to 20 flowers on a peduncle 20–40 mm (0.79–1.57 in) long, the individual flowers creamy-white and up to 10 mm (0.39 in) long, each on a pedicel up to 12 mm (0.47 in) long. Flowering occurs from August to December and the fruit is a cylindrical follicle up to 100 mm (3.9 in) long, containing winged seeds 15–20 mm (0.59–0.79 in) long.

== Taxonomy ==
Stenocarpus angustifolius was first formally described in 1919 by Cyril Tenison White in the Botany Bulletin of the Department of Agriculture, Queensland from specimens collected near Stannary Hills by Thomas Lane Bancroft. The specific epithet (angustifolius) means "narrow-leaved".

== Distribution and habitat ==
This species grows in woodland and near watercourses in the ranges between Mingela and the Atherton Tableland in north Queensland.
