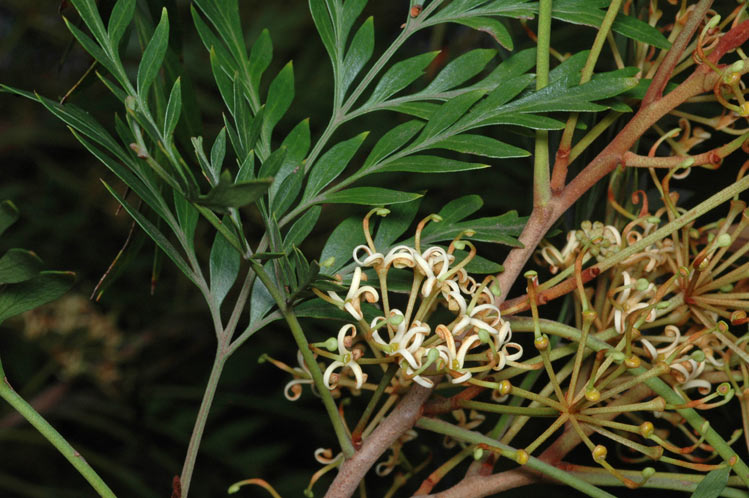
- Stenocarpus davallioides in Mt Annan Botanic Gardens

Scientific classification
- Kingdom: Plantae
- Clade: Embryophytes
- Clade: Tracheophytes
- Clade: Spermatophytes
- Clade: Angiosperms
- Clade: Eudicots
- Order: Proteales
- Family: Proteaceae
- Genus: Stenocarpus
- Species: S. davallioides

Binomial name
- Stenocarpus davallioides Foreman & B.Hyland

= Stenocarpus davallioides =

Fern-leaved stenocarpus

Species of tree native to Queensland, Australia

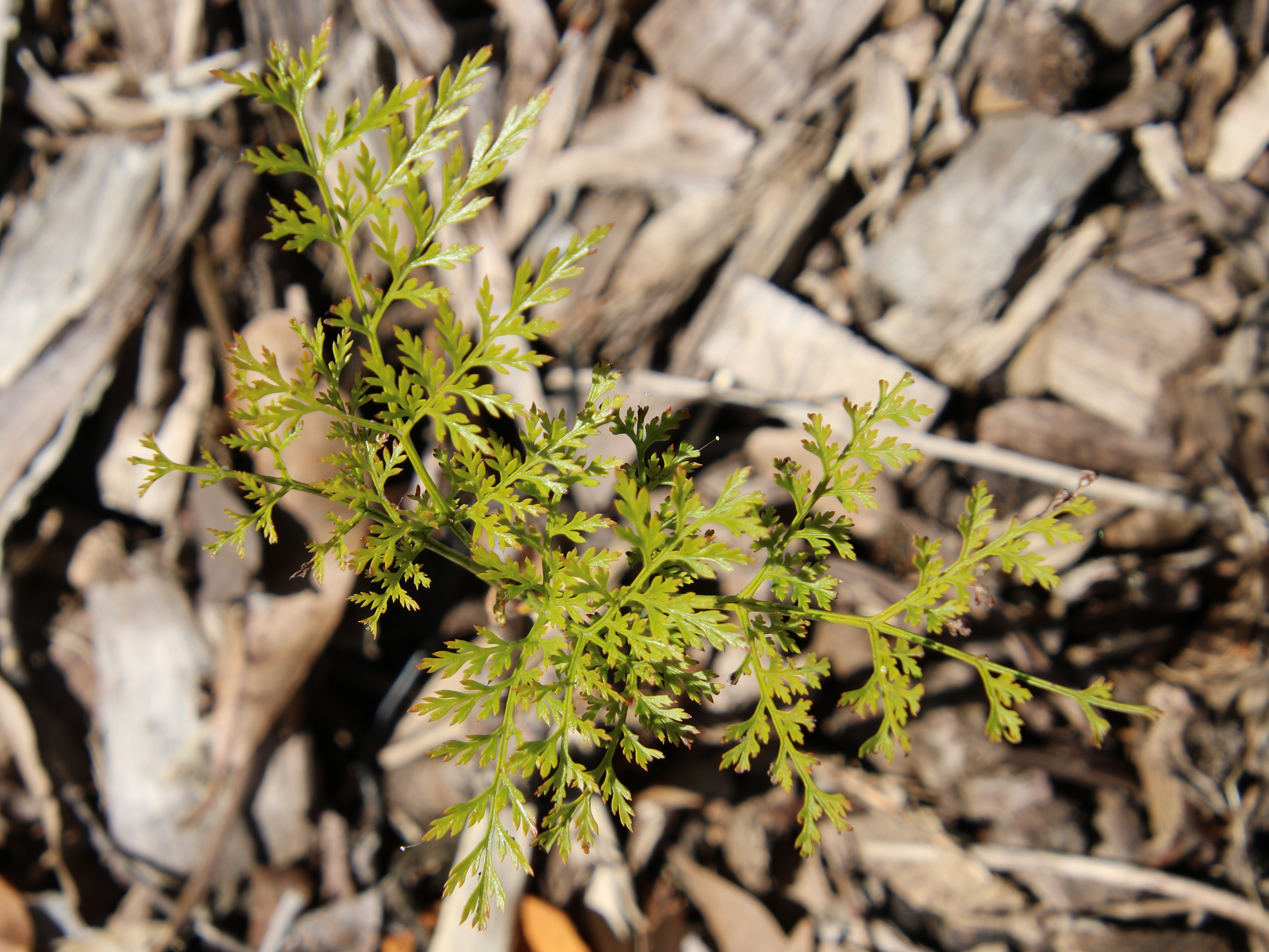
Juvenile leaves

Stenocarpus davallioides, commonly known as the fern-leaved stenocarpus, is a species of flowering plant in the family Proteaceae and is endemic to north Queensland. It is a tree with simple or pinnate adult leaves, groups of creamy-green flowers and narrow oblong follicles.

== Description ==
Stenocarpus davallioides is a tree that typically grows to a height of up to 40 m (130 ft) with a dbh of up to 160 cm (63 in) and some buttressing of the base. Young plants and coppice regrowth have finely divided, fern-like leaves up to 420 mm (17 in) long on a petiole up to 100 mm (3.9 in) long. Adult leaves are mainly simple, lance-shaped and 50–130 mm (2.0–5.1 in) long on a petiole 10–20 mm (0.39–0.79 in) long, but some are intermediate, resembling the juvenile leaves. The flower groups are arranged in leaf axils with up to fifteen flowers on a peduncle 15–40 mm (0.59–1.57 in) long, the individual flowers creamy-green and 8–12 mm (0.31–0.47 in) long, each on a pedicel 6–12 mm (0.24–0.47 in) long. Flowering mainly occurs in November and the fruit is a narrow oblong follicle up to 65 mm (2.6 in) long, containing up to eight winged seeds.

== Taxonomy ==
Stenocarpus davallioides was first formally described in 1988 by Donald Bruce Foreman and Bernard Hyland in the journal Muelleria from specimens collected by Hyland in 1975. Davallia is a species of fern and the suffix -oides means "like" or "resembling".

== Distribution and habitat ==
Fern-leaved stenocarpus is native to northern Queensland, where it is found on Thornton Peak and Mount Lewis National Park, ranging from 600 to 1,260 m (1,970 to 4,130 ft) above sea level.

== Use in horticulture ==
This species is rarely cultivated, but can grow in subtropical climates, though its frost tolerance is unknown.
