= Stenocarpus dumbeensis =

Conservation status
- Extinct (IUCN 2.3)

Scientific classification
- Kingdom: Plantae
- Clade: Embryophytes
- Clade: Tracheophytes
- Clade: Spermatophytes
- Clade: Angiosperms
- Clade: Eudicots
- Order: Proteales
- Family: Proteaceae
- Genus: Stenocarpus
- Species: †S. dumbeensis

Binomial name
- †Stenocarpus dumbeensis Guillaumin

Extinct species of plant endemic to New Caledonia

Stenocarpus dumbeensis was a species of plant in the family Proteaceae. It was endemic to New Caledonia.
