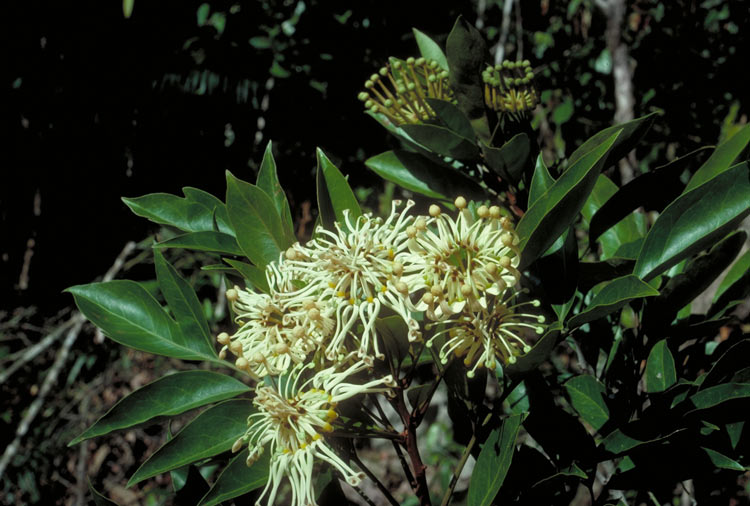

Conservation status
- Endangered (IUCN 3.1)
- Near Threatened (NCA)

Scientific classification
- Kingdom: Plantae
- Clade: Tracheophytes
- Clade: Angiosperms
- Clade: Eudicots
- Order: Proteales
- Family: Proteaceae
- Genus: Stenocarpus
- Species: S. cryptocarpus

Binomial name
- Stenocarpus cryptocarpus Foreman & B.Hyland

= Stenocarpus cryptocarpus =

Species of tree native to Australia

Stenocarpus cryptocarpus, commonly known as the giant-leaved stenocarpus, is a species of flowering plant in the family Proteaceae and is endemic to north Queensland. It is a tree with buttress roots at the base, simple, mostly elliptical adult leaves, groups of cream-coloured flowers and narrow oblong follicles.

== Description ==
Stenocarpus cryptocarpus is a tree that typically grows to a height of up to 25 m (82 ft), with a dbh of up to 40 cm (16 in). It is a canopy tree and has buttress roots at the base. The leaves of young plants are bipinnate, up to 115 cm (45 in) long on a petiole 15–20 cm (5.9–7.9 in) long. Adult leaves are simple, elliptic, more or less oblong or egg-shaped with the narrower end towards the base, and 9–14 cm (3.5–5.5 in) long on a petiole 3–8 cm (1.2–3.1 in) long.

The leaves are glossy green and covered with woolly, rust-coloured hairs when young. The flower groups are arranged in leaf axils near the ends of branches with up to 20 flowers on a peduncle 55–95 mm (2.2–3.7 in) long. The individual flowers are cream-coloured, strongly perfumed and 20–30 mm (0.79–1.18 in) long, each flower on a pedicel 10–17 mm (0.39–0.67 in) long. Flowering occurs from December to April and the fruit is a narrow oblong follicle up to 10–13 cm (3.9–5.1 in) long.

== Taxonomy ==
Stenocarpus cryptocarpus was first formally described in 1988 by botanists Don Foreman and Bernie Hyland in the journal Muelleria from specimens collected by Hyland from North Queensland in 1969. The specific epithet (cryptocarpus) means "hidden-fruited".

== Distribution and habitat ==
Giant leaved stenocarpus grows in rainforest at altitudes up to 1,000 m (3,300 ft) between Cooktown and Innisfail.
