= Stenocarpus moorei =

Scientific classification
- Kingdom: Plantae
- Clade: Embryophytes
- Clade: Tracheophytes
- Clade: Spermatophytes
- Clade: Angiosperms
- Clade: Eudicots
- Order: Proteales
- Family: Proteaceae
- Genus: Stenocarpus
- Species: S. moorei

Binomial name
- Stenocarpus moorei F.Muell.

Synonyms
- Stenocarpus papuanus Lauterb.

Species of flowering plant

Stenocarpus moorei is a species of flowering plant in the family Proteaceae and is native to Australia (Queensland and New South Wales) and New Guinea. It was first described in 1859 by Ferdinand von Mueller in Fragmenta Phytographiae Australiae, but in 1870, George Bentham reduced it to Stenocarpus salignus var. moorei in Flora Australiensis.

The Australian Plant Census considers S. moorei to be a synonym of Stenocarpus salignus, but it is an accepted name in Papua New Guinea and Stenocarpus salignus var. moorei is an accepted name in Queensland. Young leaves of S. moorei have pinnately dissected leaves, but mature trees have simple leaves.
