= Stenocarpus verticis =

Scientific classification
- Kingdom: Plantae
- Clade: Embryophytes
- Clade: Tracheophytes
- Clade: Spermatophytes
- Clade: Angiosperms
- Clade: Eudicots
- Order: Proteales
- Family: Proteaceae
- Genus: Stenocarpus
- Species: S. verticis

Binomial name
- Stenocarpus verticis Foreman

Species of tree native to Australia

Stenocarpus verticis is a species of flowering plant in the family Proteaceae and is endemic to northern Australia. It is a tree with elliptic or lance-shaped adult leaves and groups of cream-coloured flowers covered with woolly, rust-coloured or grey hairs.

== Description ==
Stenocarpus verticis is a tree that typically grows to a height of up to 20 m (66 ft) but sometimes flowers and forms fruit when still a shrub. Its young growth is covered with rusty or grey, silky hairs. The juvenile leaves are pinnate with three to seven lobes, but the adult leaves are simple, broadly lance-shaped to broadly elliptic, 55–150 mm (2.2–5.9 in) long and 17–70 mm (0.67–2.76 in) wide on a petiole 2–35 mm (0.079–1.378 in) long. The flower groups are arranged in leaf axils in umbels of forty to fifty on a peduncle 12–27 mm (0.47–1.06 in) long, each flower on a pedicel 5–12 mm (0.20–0.47 in) long. The perianth is cream-coloured, 7–9 mm (0.28–0.35 in) long and covered with woolly, rust-coloured or grey hairs. Flowering occurs from August to October and the fruit is a woody, linear follicle 30–80 mm (1.2–3.1 in) long.

== Taxonomy ==
Stenocarpus verticis was first formally described in 1995 by Donald Bruce Foreman in the Flora of Australia from specimens collected by Glenn Wightman and Clyde Dunlop near Gunn Point in 1984. The specific epithet (verticis) refers to the "top end", referring to the distribution of this species.

== Distribution and habitat ==
This species grows in rainforest or in monsoon thicket and occurs from Melville Island to the Gove Peninsula in the Northern Territory and on Cape York Peninsula in Queensland.
