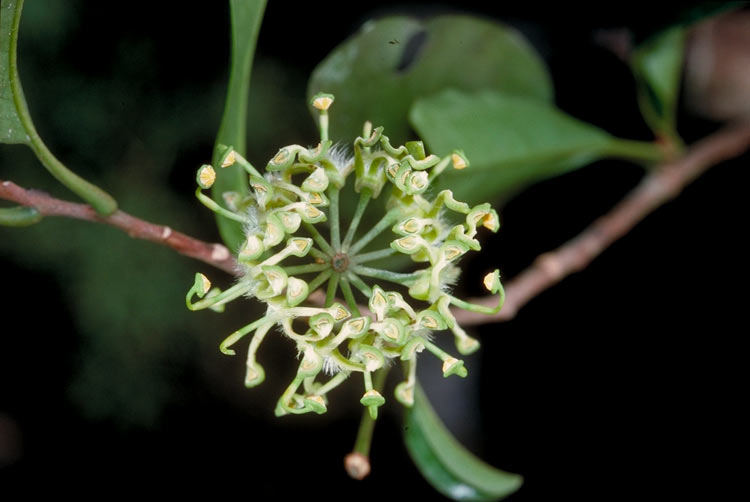

Scientific classification
- Kingdom: Plantae
- Clade: Embryophytes
- Clade: Tracheophytes
- Clade: Spermatophytes
- Clade: Angiosperms
- Clade: Eudicots
- Order: Proteales
- Family: Proteaceae
- Genus: Stenocarpus
- Species: S. reticulatus

Binomial name
- Stenocarpus reticulatus C.T.White

= Stenocarpus reticulatus =

Black silky oak

Species of tree native to Queensland, Australia

Stenocarpus reticulatus, commonly known as black silky oak, is a species of flowering plant in the family Proteaceae and is endemic to north Queensland. It is a tree with simple leaves, groups of strongly-perfumed, creamy-white flowers and flattened, semi-circular follicles.

== Description ==
Stenocarpus reticulatus is a tree that typically grows to a height of up to 35 m (115 ft) with its branchlets covered with tiny hairs when young. The leaves are lance-shaped to elliptical, 50–170 mm (2.0–6.7 in) long and 20–58 mm (0.79–2.28 in) wide on a petiole up to 18 mm (0.71 in) long. The flower groups are arranged in leaf axils with mostly eleven to fifteen flowers on a peduncle 20–32 mm (0.79–1.26 in) long, the individual flowers creamy-white and about 20 mm (0.79 in) long, each on a pedicel 7–10 mm (0.28–0.39 in) long. Flowering occurs from February to August and the fruit is a flattened, semi-circular follicle up to 85 mm (3.3 in) long, containing up to thirty winged seeds.

== Taxonomy ==
Stenocarpus reticulatus was first formally described in 1919 by Cyril Tenison White in the Botany Bulletin of the Queensland Department of Agriculture and Stock from specimens collected by H.W. Mocatta on the Atherton Tableland.

== Distribution and habitat ==
Black silky oak is restricted to the Atherton Tableland at altitudes between 400 and 1,200 m (1,300 and 3,900 ft) above sea level.
