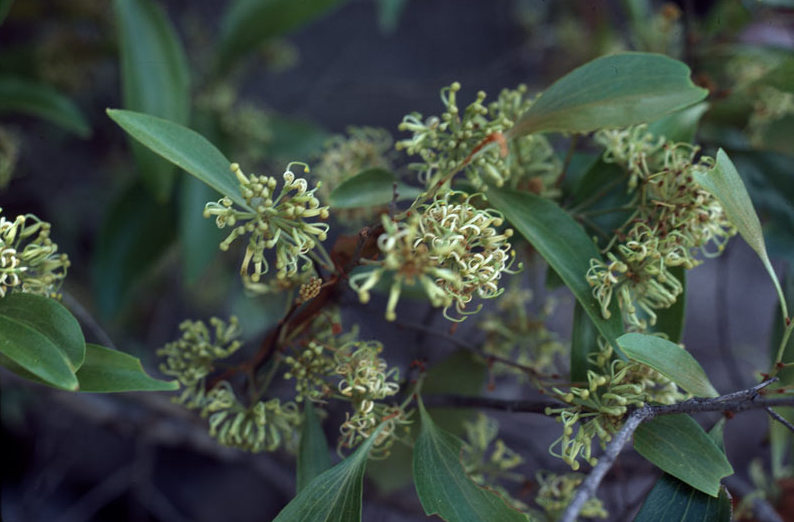
- In Kakadu National Park

Scientific classification
- Kingdom: Plantae
- Clade: Embryophytes
- Clade: Tracheophytes
- Clade: Spermatophytes
- Clade: Angiosperms
- Clade: Eudicots
- Order: Proteales
- Family: Proteaceae
- Genus: Stenocarpus
- Species: S. cunninghamii

Binomial name
- Stenocarpus cunninghamii R.Br.

Synonyms
- Cybele cunninghamii (R.Br.) Kuntze

= Stenocarpus cunninghamii =

Little wheel bush

Species of tree

Stenocarpus cunninghamii, commonly known as little wheel bush, is a species of flowering plant in the family Proteaceae and is endemic to northern Australia. It is a shrub or small tree with simple, narrow elliptic or lance-shaped adult leaves, groups of pale yellow or white flowers and woody, linear follicles.

== Description ==
Stenocarpus cunninghamii is a shrub or tree that typically grows to a height of 1–12 m (3 ft 3 in – 39 ft 4 in), with a dbh of up to 30 cm (12 in). The adult leaves are narrow elliptic or narrow lance-shaped with the narrower end towards the base, 25–110 mm (0.98–4.33 in) long and 4–18 mm (0.16–0.71 in) wide on a petiole 4–7 mm (0.16–0.28 in) long. Juvenile leaves are elliptic to egg-shaped in outline and lobed or deeply bipinnately-lobed. The flower groups are arranged in leaf axils with 14 to 21 flowers on a peduncle 3–19 mm (0.12–0.75 in) long, the individual flowers pale yellow to white and 4–5 mm (0.16–0.20 in) long, each on a pedicel 4–5 mm (0.16–0.20 in) long. Flowering occurs from March to May and the fruit is a woody, linear follicle 40–60 mm (1.6–2.4 in) long, containing winged seeds.

== Taxonomy ==
Stenocarpus cunninghamii was first formally described in 1830 by Robert Brown in an addendum to the Supplementum primum Prodromi florae Novae Hollandiae. The specific epithet (cunninghamii) honours the botanical collector Allan Cunningham.

== Distribution and habitat ==
Little wheel bush usually grows in narrow sandstone gorges and in forest and dry scrub from the coast of the Kimberley region in Western Australia to near Wadeye in the Northern Territory and on Cape York Peninsula.
