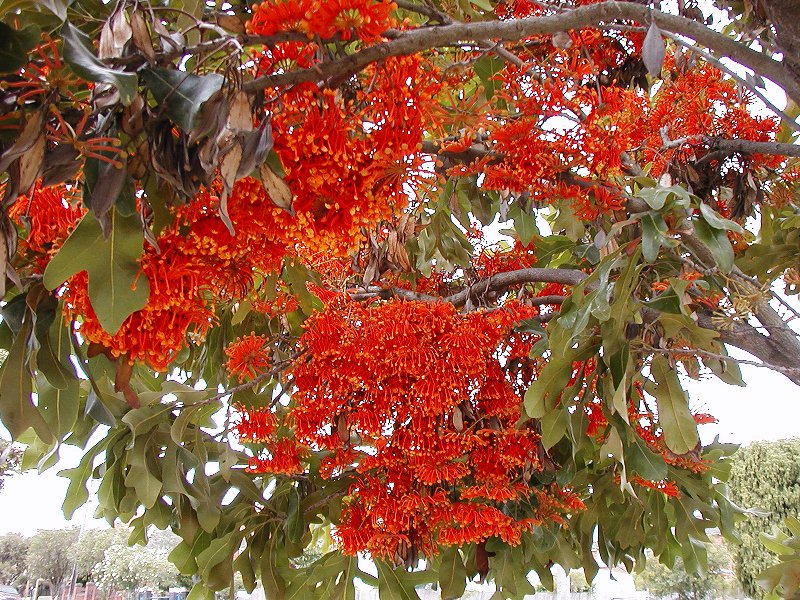
- Stenocarpus sinuatus

Scientific classification
- Kingdom: Plantae
- Clade: Tracheophytes
- Clade: Angiosperms
- Clade: Eudicots
- Order: Proteales
- Family: Proteaceae
- Subfamily: Grevilleoideae
- Tribe: Embothrieae
- Subtribe: Stenocarpinae
- Genus: Stenocarpus; R.Br.

Species
- About 22 spp. (see text)

= Stenocarpus =

Genus of flowering plants

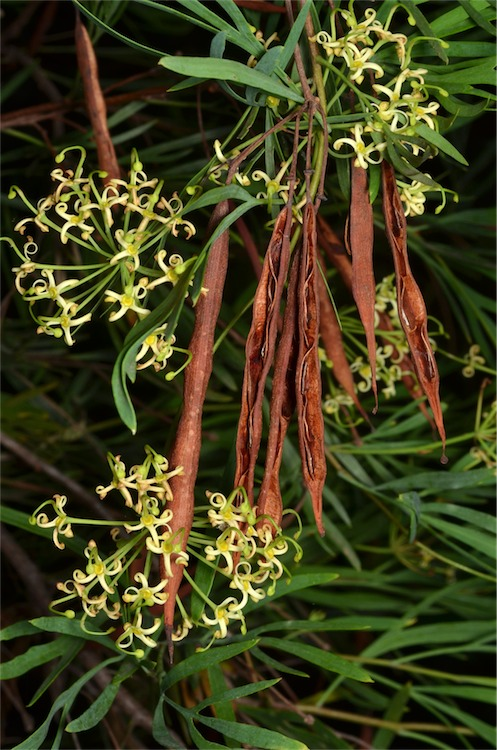
Stenocarpus angustifolius foliage, flowers and fruit

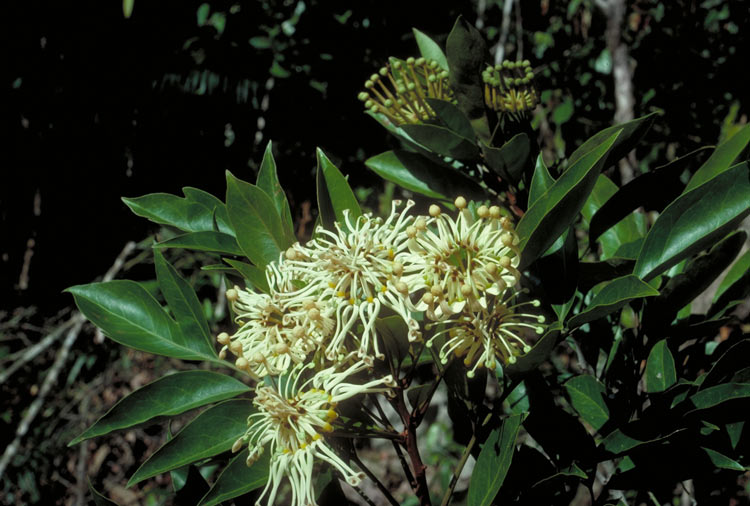
Stenocarpus cryptocarpus

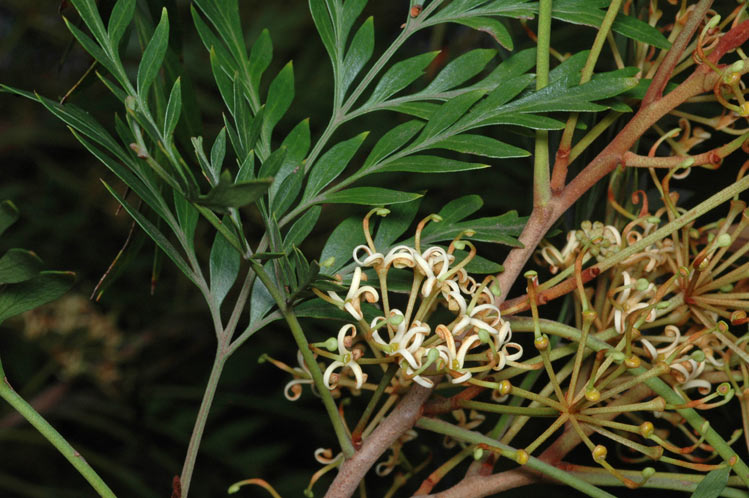
Stenocarpus davallioides

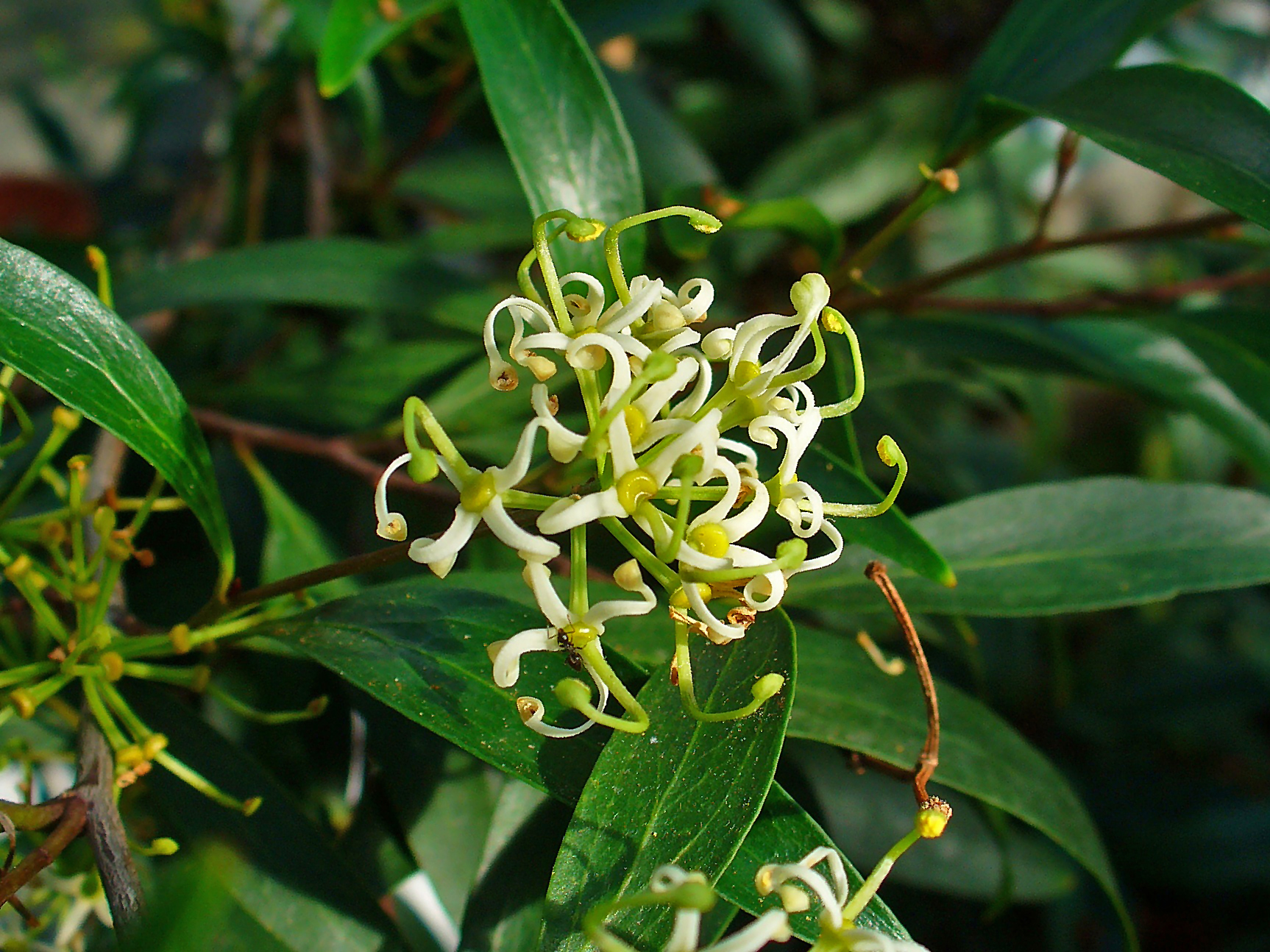
Stenocarpus salignus

Stenocarpus is a genus of about 22 species of flowering plants in the family Proteaceae. They are trees or shrubs with variably-shaped leaves, zygomorphic, bisexual flowers, the floral tube opening on the lower side before separating into four parts, followed by fruit that is usually a narrow oblong or cylindrical follicle.

== Description ==
Plants in the genus Stenocarpus are trees or shrubs with leaves that may be simple, compound or lobed, depending on the species. The flowers are arranged in umbels or racemes at or near the ends of branches and are zygomorphic and bisexual. Four tepals form a flower tube that opens on the lower side at first before separating into four with a spherical end, there are four sessile anthers, the single carpel is stalked and the pollen presenter is an oblique, flattened disc. The fruit is a follicle that usually opens by splitting down one side and contains up to fifty seeds.

== Taxonomy ==
The genus Stenocarpus was first formally described in 1810 by Robert Brown in the Transactions of the Linnean Society of London. The name Stenocarpus means "narrow fruit", referring to the long follicles of most species.

=== Species list ===
The following is a list of Stenocarpus species accepted by Plants of the World Online as at September 2021:

- Stenocarpus acacioides F.Muell. (N.T., W.A.)
- Stenocarpus angustifolius C.T.White (Qld.)
- Stenocarpus comptonii S.Moore (New Caledonia)
- Stenocarpus cryptocarpus Foreman & B.Hyland – giant-leaved stenocarpus (Qld.)
- Stenocarpus cunninghamii R.Br. – little wheel bush (W.A., N.T., Qld.)
- Stenocarpus davallioides Foreman & B.Hyland – fern-leaved stenocarpus (Qld.)
- Stenocarpus dumbeensis Guillaumin (New Caledonia)
- Stenocarpus gracilis Brongn. & Gris (New Caledonia)
- Stenocarpus heterophyllus Brongn. & Gris (New Caledonia)
- Stenocarpus intermedius Brongn. & Gris (New Caledonia)
- Stenocarpus milnei Hook. (New Caledonia)
- Stenocarpus moorei F.Muell. (New Guinea, Qld., N.S.W.)
- Stenocarpus phyllodineus S.Moore (New Caledonia)
- Stenocarpus reticulatus C.T.White – black silky oak (Qld.)
- Stenocarpus rubiginosus Brongn. & Gris (New Caledonia)
- Stenocarpus salignus R.Br. – scrub beefwood (N.S.W., Qld.)
- Stenocarpus sinuatus (Otto & A.Dietr.) Endl. – firewheel tree (New Guinea, N.S.W., Qld.)
- Stenocarpus tremuloides Brongn. & Gris (New Caledonia)
- Stenocarpus trinervis (Montrouz.) Guillaumin (New Caledonia)
- Stenocarpus umbellifer (J.R.Forst. & G.Forst.) Schltr. (New Caledonia)
- Stenocarpus verticis Foreman (N.T., Qld.)
- Stenocarpus villosus Brongn. & Gris (New Caledonia)

== Distribution ==
Twelve species of Stenocarpus are endemic to New Caledonia. Of the ten species found in Australia, eight are endemic, occurring in New South Wales, Queensland, the Northern Territory and Western Australia. A further two species, S. moorei and S. sinuatus, also occur in New Guinea and the Aru Islands.
