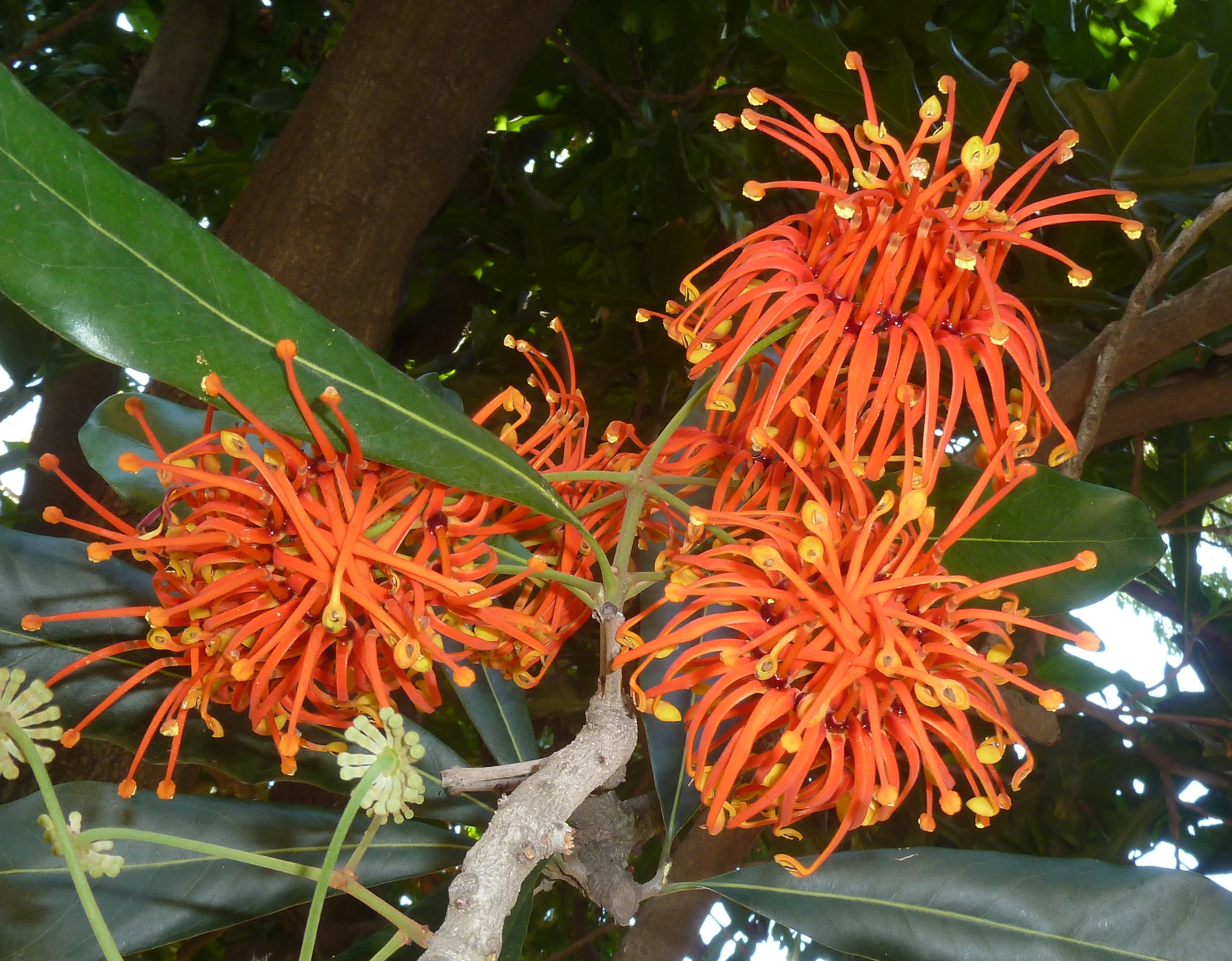

Scientific classification
- Kingdom: Plantae
- Clade: Tracheophytes
- Clade: Angiosperms
- Clade: Eudicots
- Order: Proteales
- Family: Proteaceae
- Genus: Stenocarpus
- Species: S. sinuatus

Binomial name
- Stenocarpus sinuatus Endl.

= Stenocarpus sinuatus =

Species of tree native to Australia

Stenocarpus sinuatus, known as the firewheel tree, is an Australian rainforest tree in the family Proteaceae. The range of natural distribution is in various rainforest types from the Nambucca River (30° S) in New South Wales to the Atherton Tableland (17° S) in tropical Queensland. Stenocarpus sinuatus is widely planted as an ornamental tree in other parts of Australia and in different parts of the world.

Other common names include the white beefwood, Queensland firewheel tree, tulip flower, white oak and white silky oak.

== Description ==
A medium to large tree, up to 40 metres (130 ft) tall and 75 cm (30 in) in trunk diameter. The bark is greyish brown, not smooth and irregular. The base of the cylindrical trunk is flanged.

Leaves alternate and variable in shape, simple or pinnatifid, the leaf margins wavy. 12 to 20 cm long. Leaf venation is clearly seen above and below the leaf. Leaves are characteristic and easily identified as part of the Protea family.

The ornamental flowers are bright red in umbels, in a circular formation, hence the name Firewheel Tree. Flowers form mostly between February and March. The fruit is a follicle, in a boat shape, 5 to 10 cm (2 to 4 in) long. Inside are many thin seeds 12 mm long. Fruit matures from January to July.

Regeneration from fresh seed occurs speedily. Cuttings also strike well.

== Uses ==
It is a popular ornamental tree.

== In art ==
The flower (as Wheel Flower) is the subject of some of Margaret Preston's most popular prints
