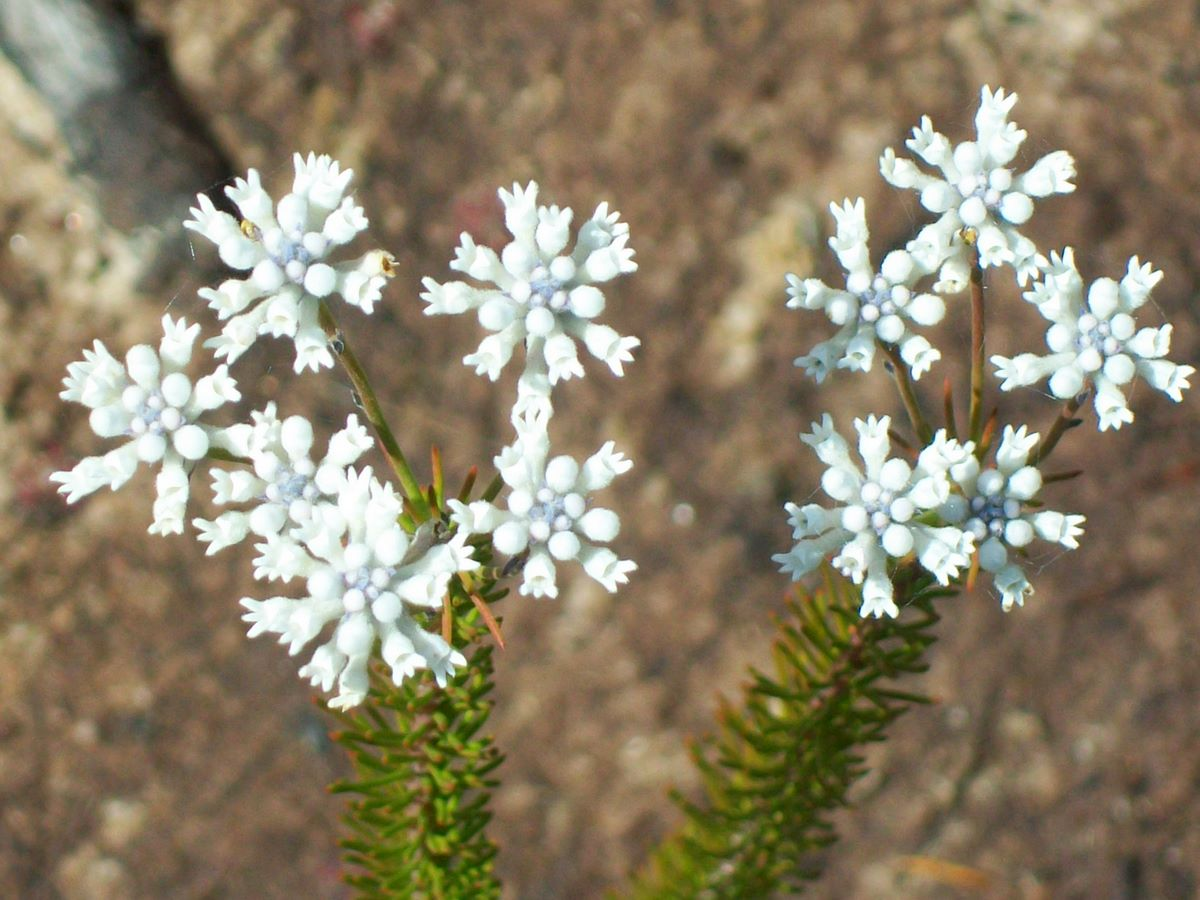
- Conospermum ericifolium

Scientific classification
- Kingdom: Plantae
- Clade: Tracheophytes
- Clade: Angiosperms
- Clade: Eudicots
- Order: Proteales
- Family: Proteaceae
- Subfamily: Proteoideae
- Tribe: Conospermeae
- Subtribe: Conosperminae
- Genus: Conospermum; Sm.

= Conospermum =

Genus of plants endemic to Australia

Conospermum is a genus of about 50 species of flowering plants in the family Proteaceae that are endemic to Australia. Members of the genus are known as smokebushes - from a distance, their wispy heads of blue or grey flowers resemble puffs of smoke. They have an unusual pollination method that sometimes leads to the death of visiting insects. They are found in all Australian states, though most occur only in Western Australia. Smokebushes are rarely cultivated, though the flowers of several Western Australian species are harvested for the cut flower industry.

== Description ==
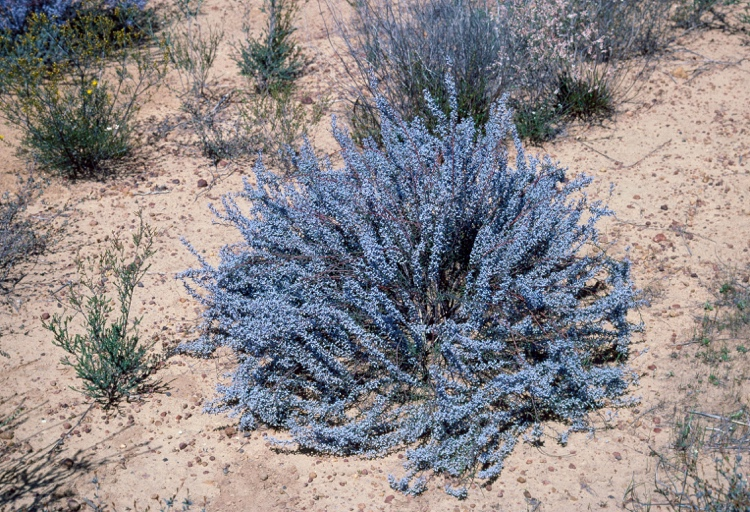
Conospermum croniniae

Conospermum species are shrubs or small trees ranging in height from 0.3 metres (1 ft) to 4 metres (10 ft). The leaves are usually simple, linear or egg-shaped and have margins without teeth. The flowers have both male and female parts, are arranged in heads or spikes of a few to many flowers and are white pink, blue, grey or cream-coloured. The fruit is a small nut usually with a fringe of hairs at its base.

== Taxonomy and naming ==
The genus was first formally described by James Edward Smith in 1798 and the description was published in Transactions of the Linnean Society of London. The name (Conospermum) is from the Ancient Greek words κῶνος (kônos) meaning "cone" and σπέρμα (spérma) meaning "seed" referring to the shape of the nut. Members of the genus are commonly known as smokebushes due to the grey flowers resembling smoke arising off the plant. The type species is the long leaf smokebush (C. longifolium), though Smith did not get around to describing it until 1806.

Australian botanists Lawrie Johnson and Barbara Briggs placed Conospermum in the subtribe Conosperminae along with the genus Synaphea in their 1975 monograph "On the Proteaceae: the evolution and classification of a southern family". Molecular evidence confirmed the two genera are each other's closest relatives.

== Distribution and habitat ==
Conospermum species are found in all mainland Australian states. Most species occur in the south-west of Western Australia but six species occur in New South Wales and one in Tasmania.

== Ecology ==
Members of this genus have flowers that are pollinated by insects. The flowers are unusual in that when they open, the style is compressed. When an insect lands on the flower, the style flicks from one side of the flower to the other, at the same time collecting pollen and adding adhesive to the insect. The fertile anthers then "explode" dusting the insect with pollen. The force of the "flick" can kill small ants and flies. Some bees in the genus Leioproctus (L. conospermi, L. pappus and L. tomentosus) feed exclusively on one or two species of Conospermum obtaining both nectar and pollen. Some appear to be camouflaged, having white eyes, milky-coloured wings and bodies covered with white hair. Leioproctus can be considered as closely co-evolved. Other bees are too large to fit inside the unscented tubular flowers of Conospermum, According to a 2020 paper, ant pollination, which is quite rare in plants, is a key component of Conospermum pollination because the plant has overcome the ant's antimicrobial defenses. "Although ants were generalist visitors, they carried a pollen load with 68–86% of suitable grains. Moreover, ants significantly contributed to the seed set of C. undulatum."

== Use in horticulture ==
Although not common in horticulture, some members of the genus Conospermum, especially the Western Australian smoke bushes are particularly attractive. The western species are difficult to propagate and the eastern ones are not of great horticultural potential.

Four species—summer smokebush (C. crassinervium), plume smokebush (C. incurvum), common smokebush (C. stoechadis) and tree smokebush (C. triplinervium)—are used in the cut flower industry. Mostly harvested from the wild, they are difficult to cultivate, although information on growing 6 species on a commercial scale is available.

== Species ==
- Conospermum acerosum – needle-leaved smokebush (W.A.)
- Conospermum amoenum – blue smokebush (W.A.)
- Conospermum boreale (W.A.)
- Conospermum brachyphyllum (W.A.)
- Conospermum bracteosum (W.A.)
- Conospermum brownii – blue-eyed smokebush (W.A.)
- Conospermum burgessiorum (N.S.W., Qld.)
- Conospermum caeruleum – blue brother (W.A.)
- Conospermum canaliculatum (W.A.)
- Conospermum capitatum (W.A.)
- Conospermum cinereum (W.A.)
- Conospermum coerulescens (W.A.)
- Conospermum crassinervium – summer smokebush, tassel smokebush (W.A.)
- Conospermum croniniae (W.A.)
- Conospermum densiflorum – crown smokebush (W.A.)
- Conospermum distichum (W.A.)
- Conospermum eatoniae – blue lace (W.A.)
- Conospermum ellipticum (N.S.W.)
- Conospermum ephedroides (W.A.)
- Conospermum ericifolium (N.S.W.)
- Conospermum filifolium (W.A.)
- Conospermum flexuosum – tangled smokebush (W.A.)
- Conospermum floribundum (W.A.)
- Conospermum galeatum (W.A.)
- Conospermum glumaceum – hooded smokebush (W.A.)
- Conospermum hookeri – Tasmanian smokebush (Tas.)
- Conospermum huegelii – slender smokebush (W.A.)
- Conospermum incurvum – plume smokebush (W.A.)
- Conospermum leianthum (W.A.)
- Conospermum longifolium – long leaf smokebush (N.S.W.)
- Conospermum microflorum (W.A.)
- Conospermum mitchellii - Victorian smokebush (Vic.)
- Conospermum multispicatum (W.A.)
- Conospermum nervosum (W.A.)
- Conospermum paniculatum (W.A.)
- Conospermum patens – slender smokebush (Vic., S.A.)
- Conospermum petiolare (W.A.)
- Conospermum polycephalum (W.A.)
- Conospermum quadripetalum (W.A.)
- Conospermum scaposum (W.A.)
- Conospermum sigmoideum (W.A.)
- Conospermum spectabile (W.A.)
- Conospermum sphacelatum (Qld.)
- Conospermum stoechadis – common smokebush (W.A.)
- Conospermum taxifolium – variable smoke-bush, yew-leaf smoke bush or paint brush (N.S.W., Qld., Vic.)
- Conospermum tenuifolium – sprawling smoke-bush, slender wire lily (N.S.W.)
- Conospermum teretifolium – spider smokebush (W.A.)
- Conospermum toddii – Victoria Desert smokebush (W.A.)
- Conospermum triplinervium – tree smokebush, elk smokebush (W.A.)
- Conospermum undulatum – wavy-leaved smokebush (W.A.)
- Conospermum unilaterale (W.A.)
- Conospermum wycherleyi (W.A.)
