= C. quadripetalum =

C. quadripetalum may refer to:

- Calyptridium quadripetalum, a flower found in California, United States
- Conospermum quadripetalum, a flower found in Western Australia, Australia
