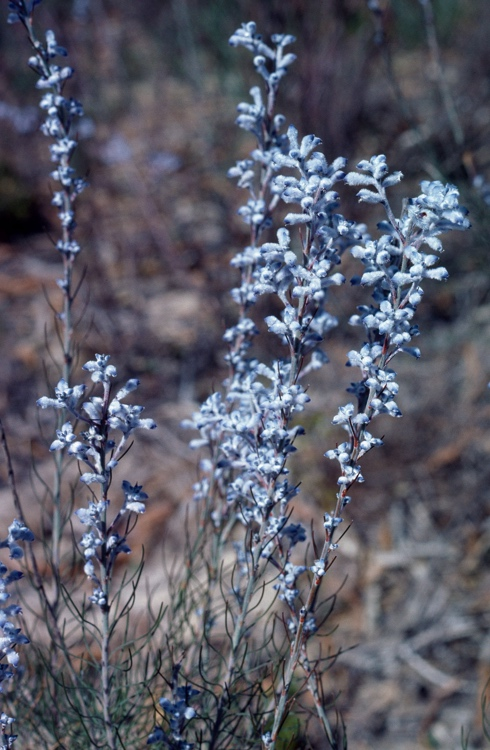
- Near Popanyinning

Scientific classification
- Kingdom: Plantae
- Clade: Tracheophytes
- Clade: Angiosperms
- Clade: Eudicots
- Order: Proteales
- Family: Proteaceae
- Genus: Conospermum
- Species: C. brachyphyllum

Binomial name
- Conospermum brachyphyllum Lindl.

Synonyms
- Conospermum brachyphyllum Lindl. var. brachyphyllum; Conospermum brachyphyllum var. laxifolium Benth.; Conospermum brachyphyllum var. rigidum Benth.

= Conospermum brachyphyllum =

Species of Australian shrub

Conospermum brachyphyllum is a species of flowering plant in the family Proteaceae and is endemic to the south-west of Western Australia. It is an open shrub thread-like leaves, and panicles of woolly, white flowers.

== Description ==
Conospermum brachyphyllum is an open shrub that typically grows to a height of 1 m (3 ft 3 in). It has ascending, thread-like leaves, 22–55 mm (0.87–2.17 in) long and 0.4–0.75 mm (0.016–0.030 in) wide. The flowers are arranged in a panicle of spikes on a peduncle 15–80 mm (0.59–3.15 in) long with bluish-brown bracteoles 2.5–4 mm (0.098–0.157 in) long and 1.8–3 mm (0.071–0.118 in) wide with a woolly base. The flowers are white, forming a tube 3–9 mm (0.12–0.35 in) long, the upper lip egg-shaped, 2–3 mm (0.079–0.118 in) long and 0.8–1.3 mm (0.031–0.051 in) wide, the lower lip joined for 1.5–2.8 mm (0.059–0.110 in) long with lobes 0.3–0.7 mm (0.012–0.028 in) long. Flowering occurs from August to October.

== Taxonomy ==
Conospermum brachyphyllum was first formally described in 1839 by John Lindley in his A Sketch of the Vegetation of the Swan River Colony. The specific epithet (brachyphyllum) means "short-leaved".

== Distribution ==
This species of Conospermum grows in sand over laterite or in gravel between Moora and Geraldton in the Avon Wheatbelt, Geraldton Sandplains and Swan Coastal Plain bioregions of south-western Western Australia.
