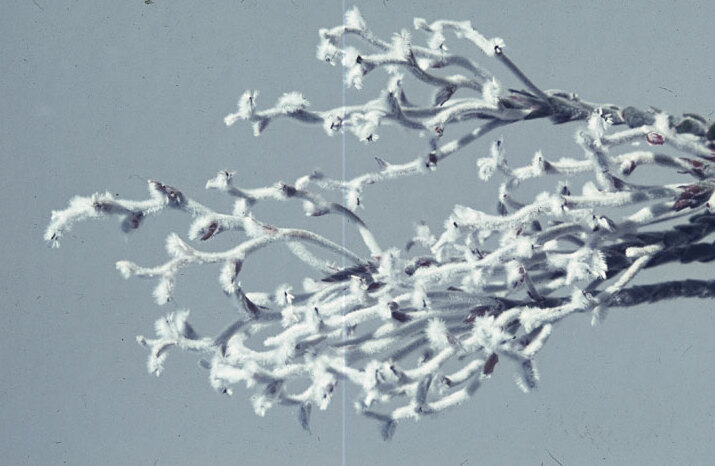

Scientific classification
- Kingdom: Plantae
- Clade: Tracheophytes
- Clade: Angiosperms
- Clade: Eudicots
- Order: Proteales
- Family: Proteaceae
- Genus: Conospermum
- Species: C. bracteosum

Binomial name
- Conospermum bracteosum Meisn.

= Conospermum bracteosum =

Species of Australian shrub

Conospermum bracteosum is a species of flowering plant in the family Proteaceae and is endemic to the south-west of Western Australia. It is an erect, spindly shrub with egg-shaped leaves, sometimes with the narrower end towards the base, and spikes of silky, woolly, tube-shaped white flowers.

== Description ==
Conospermum bracteosum is an erect, spindly shrub that typically grows to a height of 0.3–1.1 m (1 ft 0 in – 3 ft 7 in) and has egg-shaped leaves, sometimes with the narrower end towards the base, 10–15 mm (0.39–0.59 in) long and 6–15 mm (0.24–0.59 in) wide. The leaves at the base of the plant are on a petiole, but the leaves on the stem are hairy, white, overlapping, sessile and stem-clasping. The flowers are arranged in many spikes in upper leaf axils, each with up to 10 flowers, with egg-shaped bracteoles 5–7 mm (0.20–0.28 in) long and 4–5 mm (0.16–0.20 in) wide. The petals are joined at the base to form a silky-woolly tube, 3.5–4.0 mm (0.14–0.16 in) long, the upper lip 2.75–3.25 mm (0.108–0.128 in) long and 1.0–1.25 mm (0.039–0.049 in) wide, the lower lip with linear lobes 1.5–2.0 mm (0.059–0.079 in) long and about 0.5 mm (0.020 in) wide. Flowering occurs from September to November and the fruit is a nut about 3 mm (0.12 in) long, 2 mm (0.079 in) wide and covered with golden hairs.

== Taxonomy ==
Conospermum bracteosum was first formally described in 1845 by Carl Meissner in Lehmann's Plantae Preissianae from specimens collected in 1841. The specific epithet (bracteosum) means "having many, or large bracts".

== Distribution and habitat ==
This species of Conospermum grows in sand, often over laterite, between Narrogin and Ravensthorpe in the Avon Wheatbelt, Esperance Plains and Mallee bioregions of south-western Western Australia.
