= Conospermum toddii =

Conservation status
- Priority Four — Rare Taxa (DEC)

Scientific classification
- Kingdom: Plantae
- Clade: Embryophytes
- Clade: Tracheophytes
- Clade: Angiosperms
- Clade: Eudicots
- Order: Proteales
- Family: Proteaceae
- Genus: Conospermum
- Species: C. toddii

Binomial name
- Conospermum toddii F.Muell.

Species of Australian shrub

Conospermum toddii, commonly known as Victoria Desert smokebush, is a species of flowering plant in the family Proteaceae and is endemic to inland areas of Western Australia. It is a spreading shrub with thread-like leaves, panicles of white, tube-shaped flowers and hairy nuts.

== Description ==
Conospermum toddii is a spreading shrub that typically grows to a height of 1.2–2 m (3 ft 11 in – 6 ft 7 in) and has S-shaped, thread-like leaves, 120–250 mm (4.7–9.8 in) long and 0.75–1.0 mm (0.030–0.039 in) wide. The flowers are arranged in panicles with few branches in the axils of upper leaves, with kidney-shaped to broadly egg-shaped bracteoles 2–3 mm (0.079–0.118 in) long, about 1.5 mm (0.059 in) wide and hairy. The flowers are white, forming a tube 3–4 mm (0.12–0.16 in) long, the upper lobe broadly triangular, 1–2 mm (0.039–0.079 in) long and 1.50–1.75 mm (0.059–0.069 in) wide, the lower lobe up to 2.5 mm (0.098 in) long and 0.2–0.4 mm (0.0079–0.0157 in) long. Flowering occurs from July to October, and the fruit is a nut about 2 mm (0.079 in) long and 1.5 mm (0.059 in) wide with white hairs.

== Taxonomy ==
Conospermum toddii was first formally described in 1876 by Ferdinand von Mueller in his Fragmenta phytographiae Australiae from specimens collected near Queen Victoria Spring by Jess Young. The specific epithet (toddii) honours Charles Todd.

== Distribution and habitat ==
This species of Conospermum grows in sand on sand dunes in the region to the east of Kalgoorlie in the Coolgardie, Great Victoria Desert and Murchison bioregions of Western Australia.

== Conservation status ==
Conospermum toddii is listed as "Priority Four" by the Government of Western Australia Department of Biodiversity, Conservation and Attractions, meaning that it is rare or near threatened.
