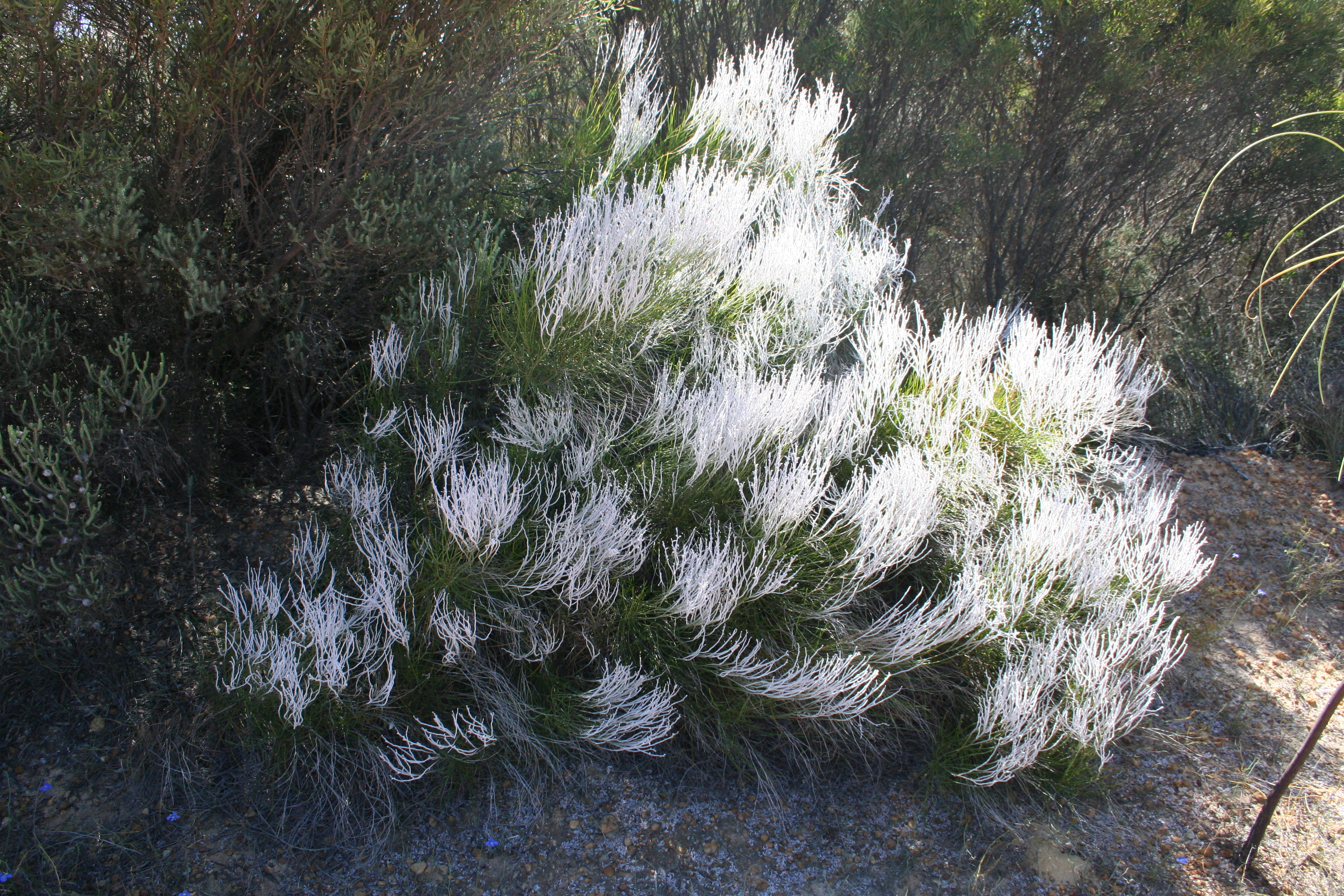

Scientific classification
- Kingdom: Plantae
- Clade: Tracheophytes
- Clade: Angiosperms
- Clade: Eudicots
- Order: Proteales
- Family: Proteaceae
- Genus: Conospermum
- Species: C. triplinervium

Binomial name
- Conospermum triplinervium R.Br.

Synonyms
- Conospermum laniflorum Endl.; Conospermum triplinervium R.Br. var. triplinervium

= Conospermum triplinervium =

Species of Australian shrub

Conospermum triplinervium, commonly known as the tree smokebush or elk smokebush, is a species of flowering plant in the family Proteaceae and is endemic to the south-west of Western Australia. It is a shrub or tree with lance-shaped leaves, the narrower end towards the base, spike-like panicles of woolly, greyish white, tube-shaped flowers and hairy nuts.

== Description ==
Conospermum triplinervium is a tree or shrub that typically grows to a height of 0.5–4.5 m (1 ft 8 in – 14 ft 9 in) and has grey bark with paler patches. The leaves are lance-shaped with the narrower end towards the base, to elliptic, 30–140 mm (1.2–5.5 in) long, 3–13 mm (0.12–0.51 in) wide and grabrous. The flowers are borne in several spike-like panicles on a peduncle 180–390 mm (7.1–15.4 in) long with egg-shaped, hairy bracteoles 2.0–2.6 mm (0.079–0.102 in) long and 2–3 mm (0.079–0.118 in) wide. The flowers are greyish white, forming a tube 2.5–4.2 mm (0.098–0.165 in) long, the lobes narrowly oblong, 0.7–1 mm (0.028–0.039 in) long and 0.2–0.4 mm (0.0079–0.0157 in) wide. Flowering occurs in March and from September to November, and the fruit is a nut 2.3–2.7 mm (0.091–0.106 in) long and about 2.5 mm (0.098 in) wide with tan, cream-coloured or orange, woolly hairs.

This species has forms with broad leaves and several habits from weeping to strong upright stems.

== Taxonomy ==
Conospermum triplinervium was first formally described in 1830 by the botanist Robert Brown in Supplementum primum prodromi florae Novae Hollandiae from specimens collected near King George Sound by William Baxter. The specific epithet (triplinervium) means 'triple-nerved' referring to the leaves.

== Distribution and habitat ==
Tree smokebush is found on sand plains and in winter wet depressions along the coast in the Avon Wheatbelt, Esperance Plains, Geraldton Sandplains, Jarrah Forest and Swan Coastal Plain bioregions of south-western Western Australia where it grows in sandy soils over laterite.

== Cultivation ==
The plant is suitable for the production of cut flowers with a reasonably high yield. It is also suitable as animal fodder, the 1889 book 'The Useful Native Plants of Australia’ records that common names included "native orange" and "orange thorn", and that "Baron Mueller suggests that these plants be tried on the worst desert country, as all kinds of pasture animals browse with avidity on the long, tender, and downy flower-stalks and spikes, without touching the foliage, thus not destroying the plant by close cropping."
