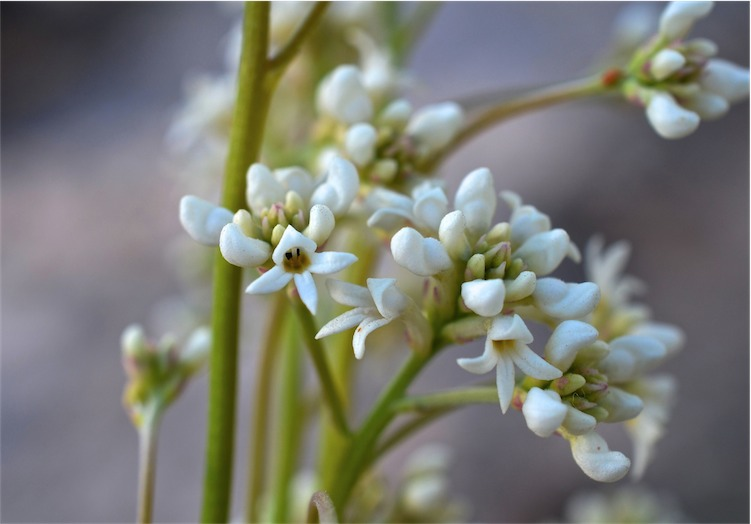

Scientific classification
- Kingdom: Plantae
- Clade: Tracheophytes
- Clade: Angiosperms
- Clade: Eudicots
- Order: Proteales
- Family: Proteaceae
- Genus: Conospermum
- Species: C. sphacelatum

Binomial name
- Conospermum sphacelatum Hook.

= Conospermum sphacelatum =

Species of Australian shrub

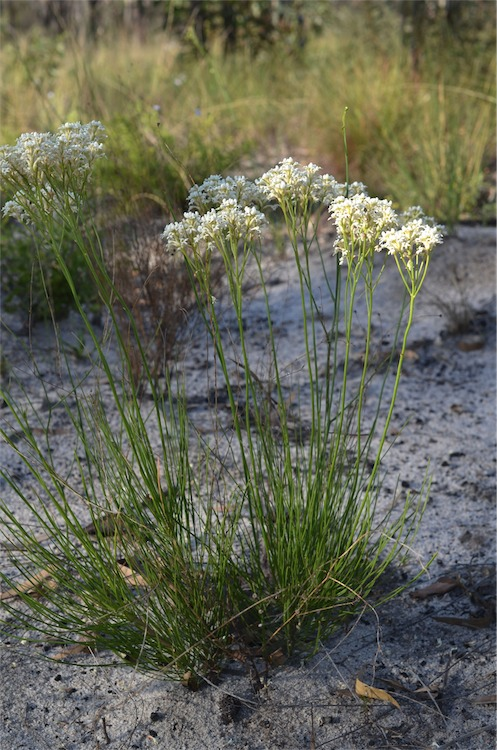
Habit in Carnarvon Station Reserve

Conospermum sphacelatum is a species of flowering plant of the family Proteaceae and is endemic to Queensland. It is an erect shrub with few branches, erect linear to narrowly egg-shaped leaves with the narrower end towards the base, hairy white flowers on the ends of branches, and white to cream-coloured nuts.

== Description ==
Conospermum sphacelatum is an erect, sparsely-branched shrub that typically grows to a height of up to 70 cm (28 in). Its leaves are linear to narrowly egg-shaped with the narrower end towards the base, 50–100 mm (2.0–3.9 in) long and 1–3 mm (0.039–0.118 in) wide. The flowers are arranged on the ends of branches or in panicles on a peduncle 50–100 mm (2.0–3.9 in) long and covered with silky to woolly hairs. There are egg-shaped to heart-shaped bracteoles 2.0–2.5 mm (0.079–0.098 in) long, 3.5–3.75 mm (0.138–0.148 in) wide and covered with silky hairs. The perianth is white with velvety or silky hairs, forming a tube 6–7 mm (0.24–0.28 in) long. The upper lip is D-shaped, 2.75–3.0 mm (0.108–0.118 in) long and 2.0–2.25 mm (0.079–0.089 in) wide, the lower lip joined for 1.25–1.5 mm (0.049–0.059 in) with oblong to broadly oblong lobes 2.5–2.75 mm (0.098–0.108 in) long and 0.75–1.0 mm (0.030–0.039 in) wide. The fruit is a nut 1.75–2.25 mm (0.069–0.089 in) long, about 3 mm (0.12 in) wide and covered with velvety white to cream-coloured hairs.

== Taxonomy ==
Conospermum sphacelatum was first formally described in 1848 by William Jackson Hooker in Thomas Mitchell's the Journal of an Expedition into the Interior of Tropical Australia The specific epithet (sphacelatum) means 'with brown or blackish speckling'.

== Distribution and habitat ==
This species of Conospermum grows in stony soils in the Leichhardt, Maranoa and Mitchell districts of Queensland.

== Conservation status ==
Conospermum sphacelatum is listed as of "least concern" under the Queensland Government Nature Conservation Act 1992.
