= Conospermum microflorum =

Scientific classification
- Kingdom: Plantae
- Clade: Tracheophytes
- Clade: Angiosperms
- Clade: Eudicots
- Order: Proteales
- Family: Proteaceae
- Genus: Conospermum
- Species: C. microflorum

Binomial name
- Conospermum microflorum E.M.Benn.

Species of shrub native to Australia

Conospermum microflorum is a species of flowering plant in the family Proteaceae and is endemic to Western Australia. It is a rounded shrub with glabrous, thread-like leaves, panicles of hairy, white or cream-coloured flowers and hairy, orange-brown nuts.

== Description ==
Conospermum microflorum is a rounded shrub that typically grows to a height of 1–2 m (3 ft 3 in – 6 ft 7 in). Its leaves are glabrous, threadlike, 25–170 mm (0.98–6.69 in) long and 0.4–1 mm (0.016–0.039 in) wide, with a brown, pointed tip. The flowers are arranged in panicles of elongated spikes on a peduncle 190–320 mm (7.5–12.6 in) long with densely hairy, egg-shaped bracteoles 1.3–2.5 mm (0.051–0.098 in) long and 2–3 mm (0.079–0.118 in) wide. The perianth is covered with white or cream-coloured hairs and forms a tube 2.5–5.5 mm (0.098–0.217 in) long. The upper lip is egg-shaped, 1.5–2.2 mm (0.059–0.087 in) long and 0.8–1.2 mm (0.031–0.047 in) wide, with a brown tip, the lower lip joined for 1.0–1.5 mm (0.039–0.059 in) and has oblong lobes 0.4–0.6 mm (0.016–0.024 in) long and 0.1–0.2 mm (0.0039–0.0079 in) wide. Flowering occurs from September to October, and the fruit is a nut 2–3 mm (0.079–0.118 in) long and 1.6 mm (0.063 in) wide, covered with orange-brown, woolly hairs.

== Taxonomy ==
Conospermum microflorum was first formally described in 1995 by Eleanor Marion Bennett in the Flora of Australia, from specimens she collected about 147 km (91 mi) north of Geraldton in 1985. The specific epithet, (microflorum) means 'small-flowered'.

== Distribution and habitat ==
This species of Conospermum grows on yellow sandy plains between the Murchison River bridge and Shark Bay, in the Carnarvon, Geraldton Sandplains and Yalgoo bioregions of Western Australia.
