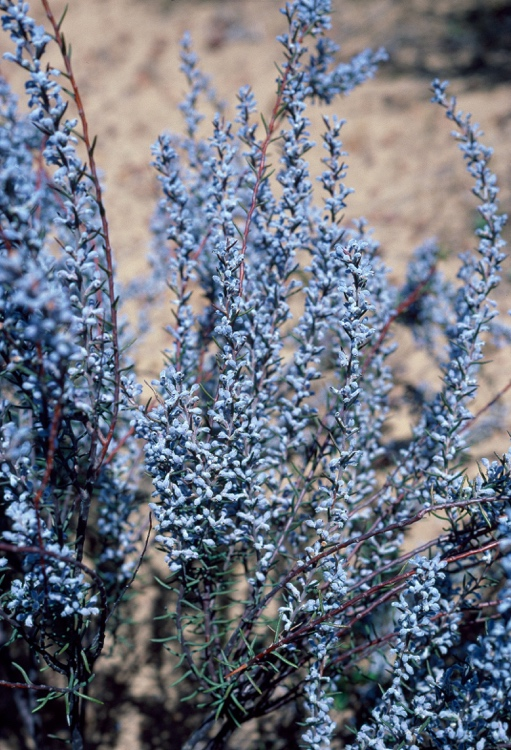

Scientific classification
- Kingdom: Plantae
- Clade: Tracheophytes
- Clade: Angiosperms
- Clade: Eudicots
- Order: Proteales
- Family: Proteaceae
- Genus: Conospermum
- Species: C. croniniae

Binomial name
- Conospermum croniniae Diels

= Conospermum croniniae =

Species of shrub native to Australia

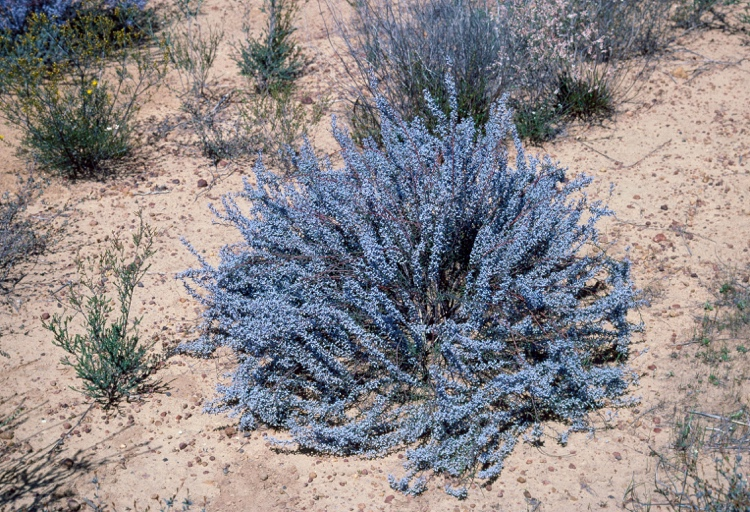
Habit near Kulin

Conospermum croniniae is a species of flowering plant in the family Proteaceae and is endemic to the south-west of Western Australia. It is an erect, open shrub with spreading cylindrical leaves and spikes of up to 6 pale blue or pink, tube-shaped, hairy flowers.

== Description ==
Conospermum croniniae is an open shrub that typically grows to a height of up to 90 cm (35 in). It has spreading, cylindrical leaves 7–10 mm (0.28–0.39 in) long, 0.3–0.5 mm (0.012–0.020 in) wide on the stems and Δ-shaped flower leaves that are 4–9 mm (0.16–0.35 in) long and 1–2 mm (0.039–0.079 in) wide on the flowering spikes. The flowers are arranged in leaf axils in a spike of up to 6 on a woolly hairy peduncle 2.5–9 mm (0.098–0.354 in) long. The bracteoles are egg-shaped with the narrower end towards the base, 1.5–2.25 mm (0.059–0.089 in) long and 2.0–3.2 mm (0.079–0.126 in) wide, and hairy. The perianth is pale blue or pink, forming a tube 3.5–4.5 mm (0.14–0.18 in) long. The upper lobe is 1.25–2.0 mm (0.049–0.079 in) long and 1.5–1.75 mm (0.059–0.069 in) wide, the lower lip joined for 0.5–0.75 mm (0.020–0.030 in) long with lobes 0.6–0.75 mm (0.024–0.030 in) long and 0.3–0.5 mm (0.012–0.020 in) wide. Flowering occurs in May or in September and October and the fruit is a nut about 2 mm (0.079 in) long and 2.25 mm (0.089 in) wide with silky white hairs.

== Taxonomy ==
Conospermum croniniae was first formally described in 1904 by Ludwig Diels in Fragmenta Phytographiae Australiae occidentalis. The specific epithet (croniniae) honours the plant collector, Mary Ann Cronin.

== Distribution and habitat ==
This species of Conospermum grows in open to dense scrub on hill slopes and winter-wet flats between Pingelly, Lake King and Kondinin in the Avon Wheatbelt, Coolgardie, Esperance Plains and Mallee bioregions of south-western Western Australia.
