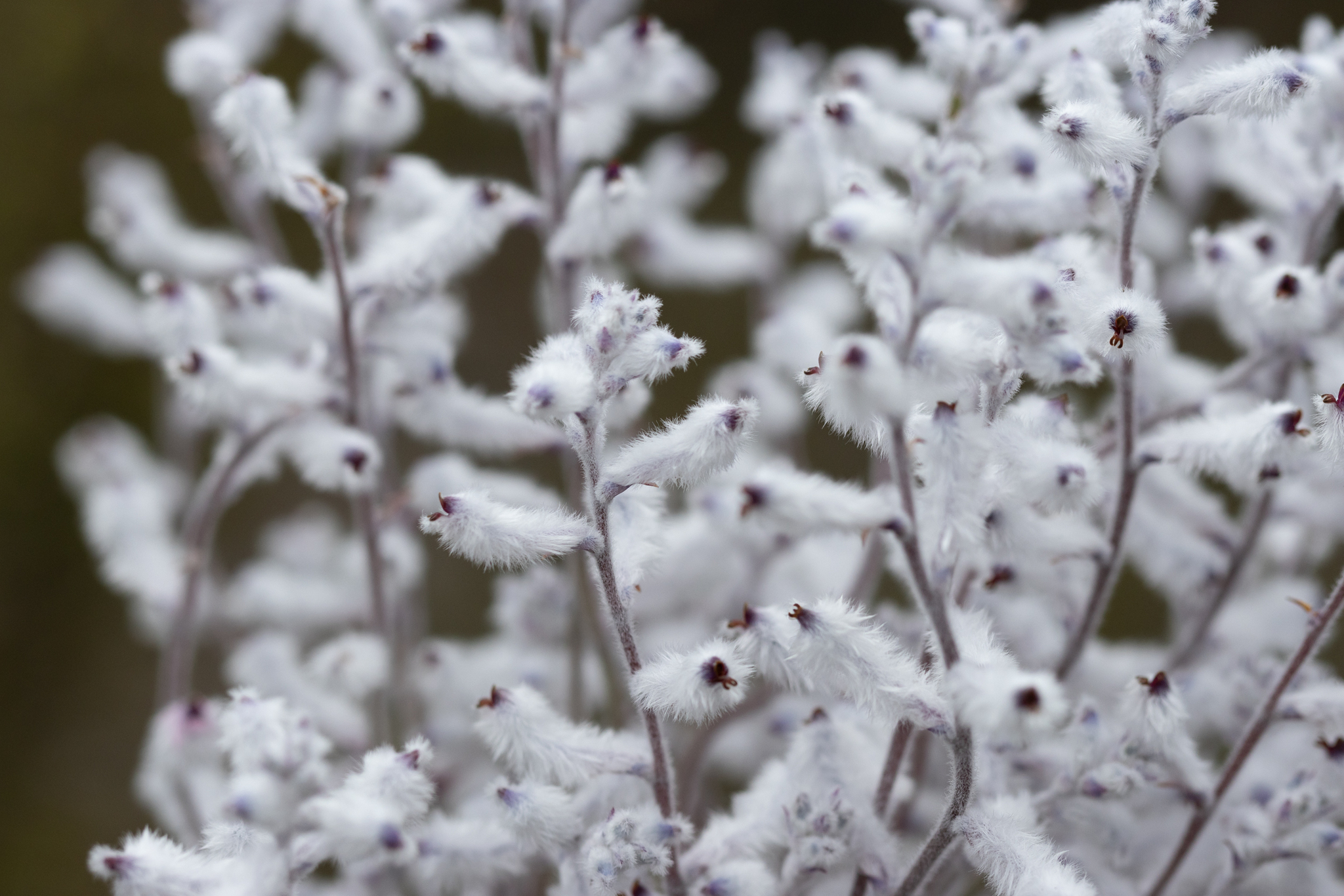

Scientific classification
- Kingdom: Plantae
- Clade: Tracheophytes
- Clade: Angiosperms
- Clade: Eudicots
- Order: Proteales
- Family: Proteaceae
- Genus: Conospermum
- Species: C. floribundum

Binomial name
- Conospermum floribundum Benth.

= Conospermum floribundum =

Species of shrub native to Australia

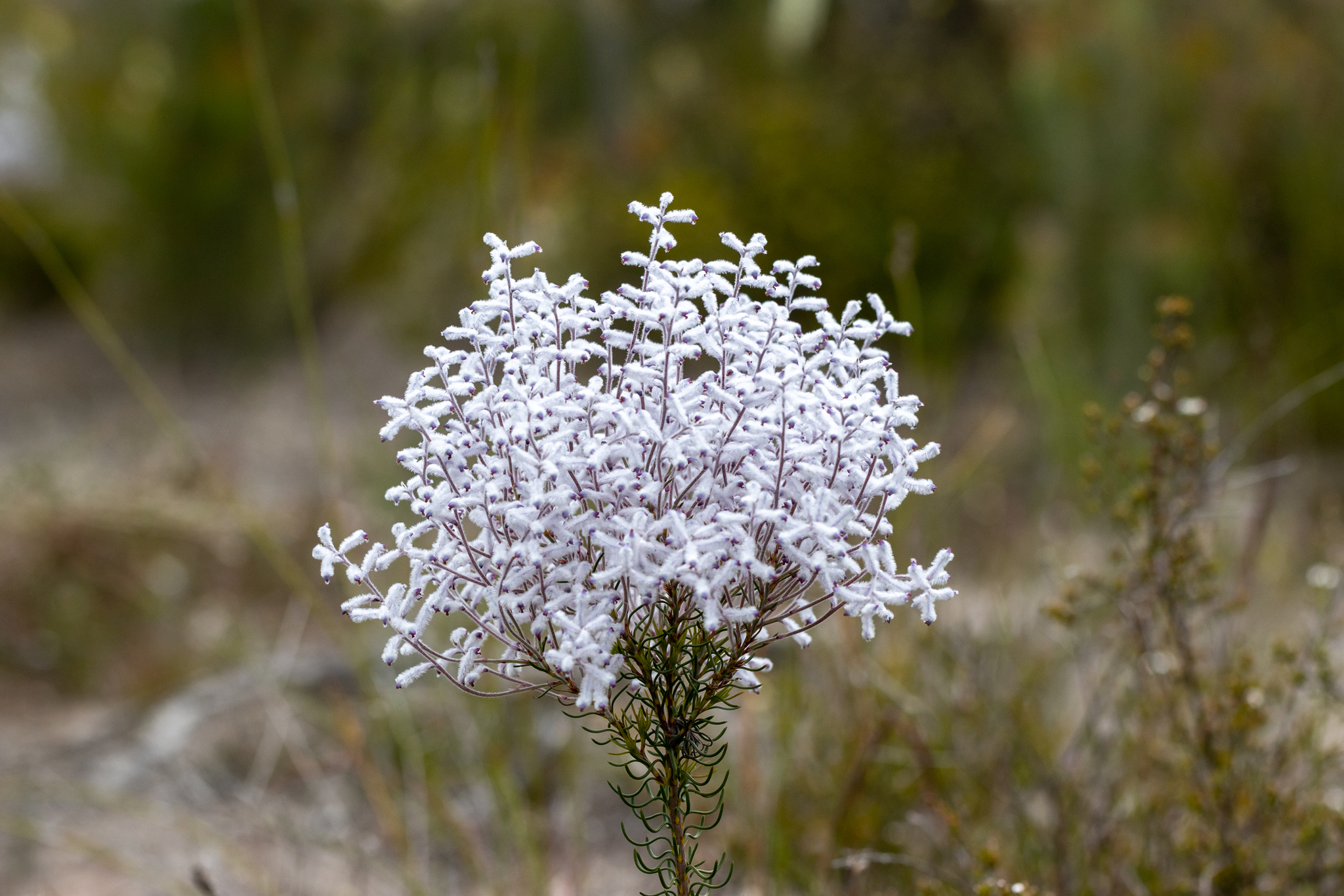
Habit near Bluff Knoll

Conospermum floribundum is a species of flowering plant in the family Proteaceae and is endemic to the south of Western Australia. It is a compact, erect shrub with narrowly linear leaves that are circular in cross-section, and spike-like panicles of white, tube-shaped flowers with blue tips.

== Description ==
Conospermum floribundum is a compact, erect shrub that typically grows to a height of up to 45 cm (18 in), sometimes up to 1.5 m (4 ft 11 in). The leaves are spreading, narrowly linear and circular in cross-section, more or less S-shaped, 12–22 mm (0.47–0.87 in) long and 0.5–0.75 mm (0.020–0.030 in) wide with a groove along the underside. The flowers are borne in spike-like panicles in leaf axils with leaf-like bracts and D-shaped, blue bracteoles 1.5–3.5 mm (0.059–0.138 in) long and 1.75–2.5 mm (0.069–0.098 in) wide. The perianth is tube-shaped, 4.1–5.2 mm (0.16–0.20 in) long and white with a blue tip, the upper lip 1.5–2.0 mm (0.059–0.079 in) long and 1.25–1.50 mm (0.049–0.059 in) wide. Flowering occurs from September to November.

== Taxonomy ==
Conospermum floribundum was first formally described in 1870 by George Bentham in his Flora Australiensis from specimens collected near the Swan River by James Drummond. The specific epithet (floribundum) means 'flowering profusely'.

== Distribution and habitat ==
This species of Conospermum occurs between Albany and the Stirling Range and east to Bremer Bay where it grows in sandy gravelly soils in the Avon Wheatbelt, Esperance Plains, Jarrah Forest and Mallee bioregions of southern Western Australia.
