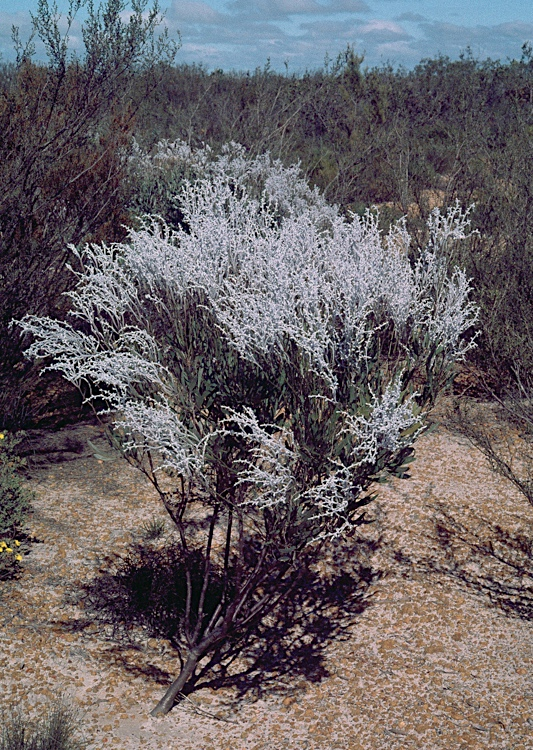
- In Alexander Morrison National Park

Scientific classification
- Kingdom: Plantae
- Clade: Tracheophytes
- Clade: Angiosperms
- Clade: Eudicots
- Order: Proteales
- Family: Proteaceae
- Genus: Conospermum
- Species: C. cinereum

Binomial name
- Conospermum cinereum E.M.Benn.

= Conospermum cinereum =

Species of shrub native to Australia

Conospermum cinereum is a species of flowering plant in the family Proteaceae and is endemic to the south west of Western Australia. It is a spindly shrub with egg-shaped to lance-shaped leaves, loose spikes of woolly, tube-shaped white flowers and woolly nuts.

== Description ==
Conospermum cinereum is a spindly shrub that typically grows to a height of 0.5–2.4 m (1 ft 8 in – 7 ft 10 in). Its leaves are ascending, egg-shaped to lance-shaped, 11–63 mm (0.43–2.48 in) long and 1–10 mm (0.039–0.394 in) wide. Its flowers are arranged in spike-like panicles longer than the leaves, on a peduncle 55–180 mm (2.2–7.1 in) long. The perianth is woolly, white and forms a tube 2.5–3.5 mm (0.098–0.138 in) long. The upper lip is 1.5–2.3 mm (0.059–0.091 in) long, the lower lip joined for 0.6–1.2 mm (0.024–0.047 in) long with lobes 0.8–1.0 mm (0.031–0.039 in) long and 0.2–0.4 mm (0.0079–0.0157 in) wide. Flowering mainly occurs from September to December and the fruit is a nut 2.2–2.7 mm (0.087–0.106 in) long and 2.2–2.4 mm (0.087–0.094 in) wide with woolly, orange-brown hairs.

== Taxonomy ==
Conospermum cinereum was first formally described in 1995 by Eleanor Marion Bennett in the Flora of Australia from specimens she collected in 1985 near Toolibin Lake.

== Distribution and habitat ==
This species of Conospermum grows in sandy soil between Toolibin, Kellerberrin and the Stirling Range in the Avon Wheatbelt, Esperance Plains and Mallee bioregions of south-western Western Australia.

== Conservation status ==
Conospermum cinereum is listed as "not threatened" by the Government of Western Australia Department of Biodiversity, Conservation and Attractions.
