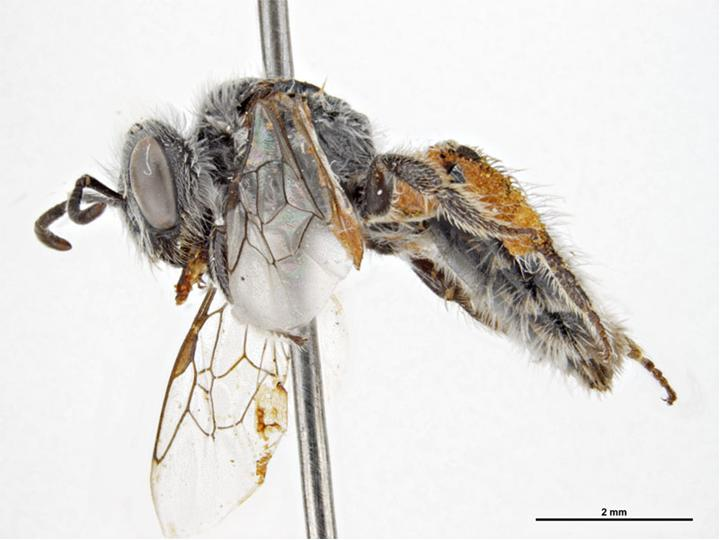
- Female

Scientific classification
- Kingdom: Animalia
- Phylum: Arthropoda
- Clade: Pancrustacea
- Class: Insecta
- Order: Hymenoptera
- Family: Colletidae
- Genus: Leioproctus
- Species: L. conospermi

Binomial name
- Leioproctus conospermi Houston, 1989

= Leioproctus conospermi =

Species of bee

Leioproctus conospermi, or Leioproctus (Leioproctus) conospermi, is a species of bee in the family Colletidae and subfamily Colletinae. It is endemic to Australia. It was described by Australian entomologist Terry Houston in 1989.

== Etymology ==
The specific epithet conospermi refers to the generic name of the forage plants.

== Description ==
The male holotype body length is 7.0 mm, female paratype 7.2 mm. Integumental colouration is mainly glossy black; the hair is white and brown.

== Distribution and habitat ==
The species occurs in south-west Western Australia from near Dongara to 150 km east of Esperance. The type locality is Mount Ragged in the Cape Arid National Park.

== Behaviour ==
The adults are flying mellivores. Flowering plants visited by the bees include Conospermum distichum.

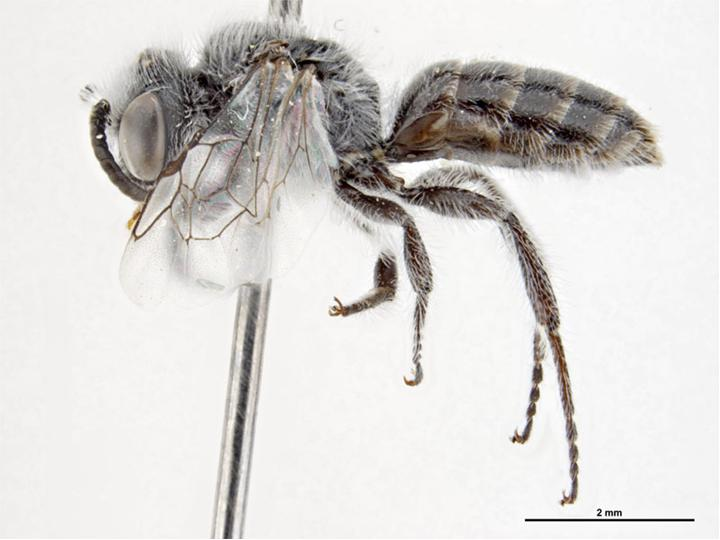
Male

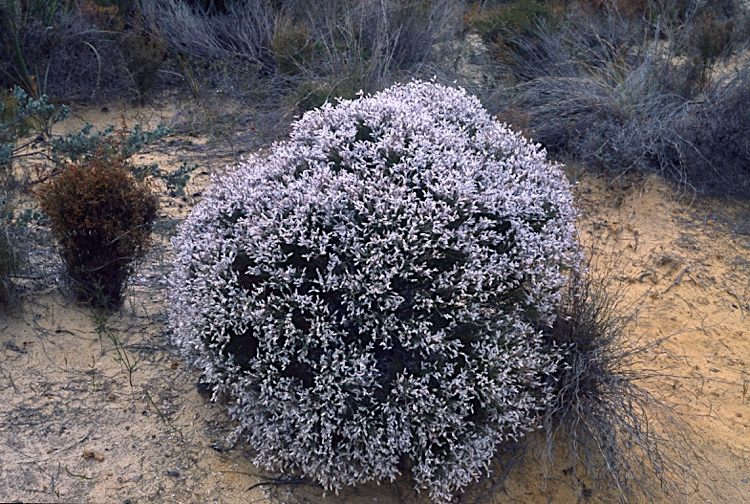
Conospermum distichum (smokebush), a forage plant of the bees
