= Conospermum petiolare =

Scientific classification
- Kingdom: Plantae
- Clade: Tracheophytes
- Clade: Angiosperms
- Clade: Eudicots
- Order: Proteales
- Family: Proteaceae
- Genus: Conospermum
- Species: C. petiolare

Binomial name
- Conospermum petiolare R.Br.

Species of flowering plant

Conospermum petiolare is a species of flowering plant in the family Proteaceae and is endemic to the south of Western Australia. It is a tufted subshrub or shrub with dense, erect, narrowly oblong leaves, and panicles of velvety cream-coloured, orange-yellow or pink, tube-shaped flowers, the fruit a hairy, brownish-yellow to gold-coloured nut.

== Description ==
Conospermum petiolare is a tufted subshrub or shrub that typically grows to a height of 1 m (3 ft 3 in). It has dense, erect, narrowly oblong leaves, 80–320 mm (3.1–12.6 in) long and 2.5–15 mm (0.098–0.591 in) wide on a petiole 25–70 mm (0.98–2.76 in) long. The flowers are arranged in racemose panicles up to 115 cm (45 in) long, with heads of 3 to 7 flowers. The heads are borne on the ends of branches in a dense panicle on a silky-hairy peduncle 7–10 mm (0.28–0.39 in) long. There are hairy, broadly egg-shaped bracteoles 6–10 mm (0.24–0.39 in) long and 3.0–5.5 mm (0.12–0.22 in) wide on the peduncle. The flowers are cream-coloured, orange-yellow or pink, and form a tube 5–85 mm (0.20–3.35 in) long with narrowly linear lobes 10–22 mm (0.39–0.87 in) long and 0.25–0.5 mm (0.0098–0.0197 in) wide. Flowering occurs from October to January, and the fruit is a woolly hairy, brownish-yellow to gold-coloured nut about 2.5 mm (0.098 in) long and 3 mm (0.12 in) wide.

== Taxonomy ==
Conospermum petiolare was first formally described in 1830 by Robert Brown in his Supplementum primum prodromi florae Novae Hollandiae. The specific epithet (petiolare) means 'borne on a petiole'.

== Distribution and habitat ==
This species of Conospermum is found on rocky slopes and winter wet areas in the Esperance Plains, Jarrah Forest and Warren bioregions, and is common between the Stirling Range and Fitzgerald River National Park of southern Western Australia, where it grows in sandy soils over granite or quartzite.
