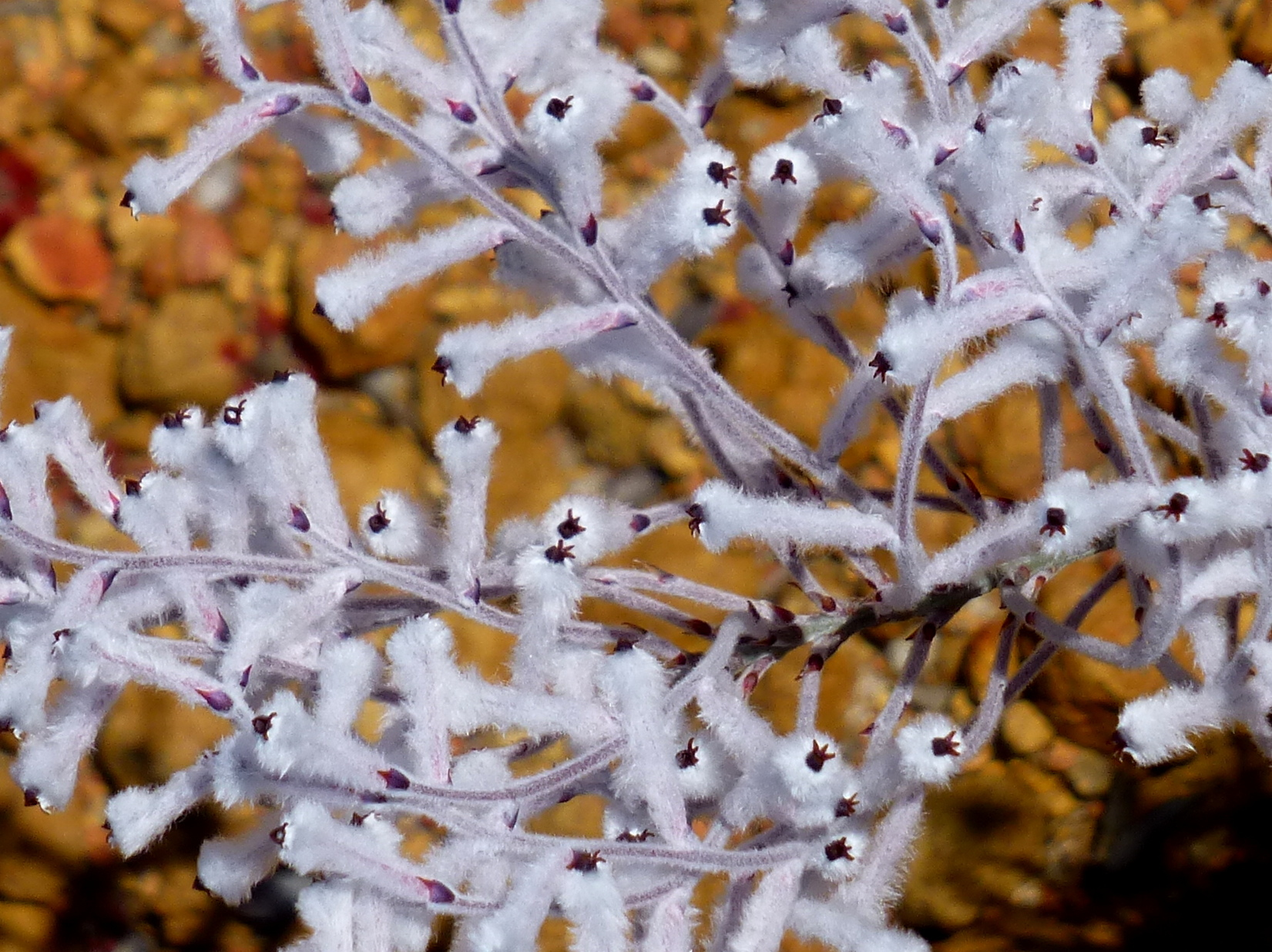

Scientific classification
- Kingdom: Plantae
- Clade: Tracheophytes
- Clade: Angiosperms
- Clade: Eudicots
- Order: Proteales
- Family: Proteaceae
- Genus: Conospermum
- Species: C. boreale

Binomial name
- Conospermum boreale E.M.Benn.

= Conospermum boreale =

Species of Australian shrub

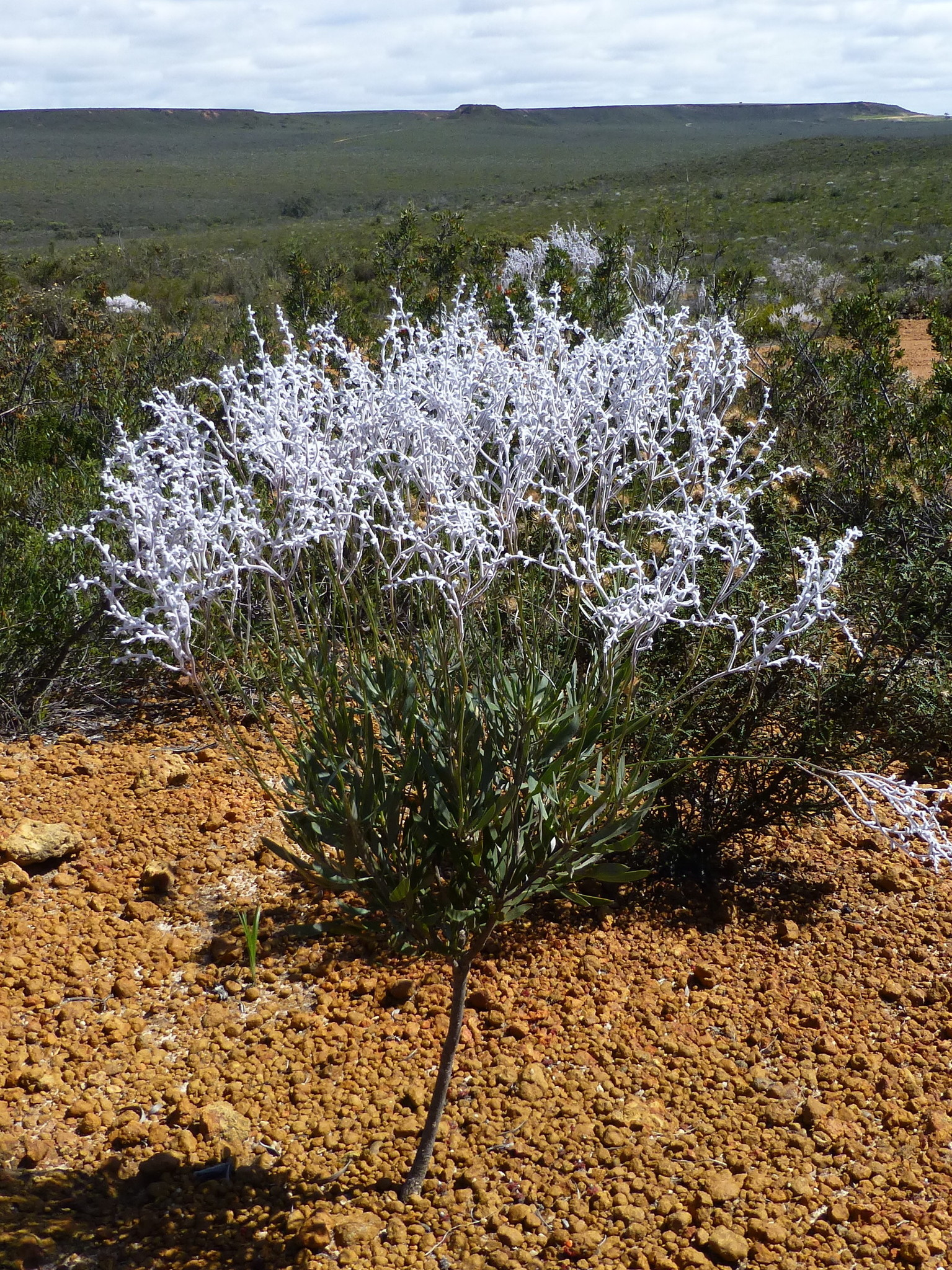
Habit near the Brand Highway

Conospermum boreale is a species of flowering plant in the family Proteaceae and is endemic to the south-west of Western Australia. It is an erect, much-branched shrub with egg-shaped to elliptic or lance-shaped leaves, and panicles of woolly, white flowers.

== Description ==
Conospermum boreale is an erect, compact shrub with many branches, that typically grows to a height of 0.8–1.8 m (2 ft 7 in – 5 ft 11 in). It has egg-shaped to elliptic, or lance-shaped leaves with the narrower end towards the base 57–96 mm (2.2–3.8 in) long and 6–10 mm (0.24–0.39 in) wide with the midvein and 2 side veins more or less prominent. The flowers are woolly and white, arranged in panicles, the flowers forming a tube 3.5–4.0 mm (0.14–0.16 in) long. The upper lip is 1.5–2.0 mm (0.059–0.079 in) long, the lower lip joined for 0.75–1.0 mm (0.030–0.039 in) long with narrowly oblong to oblong lobes 0.5–0.75 mm (0.020–0.030 in) long. Flowering occurs from August to November.

== Taxonomy ==
Conospermum boreale was first formally described in 1995 by Eleanor Marion Bennett in the Flora of Australia from specimens she collected south of Kalbarri in 1987. The specific epithet (boreale) means "northern". In the same volume of the Flora of Australia, Bennett described Conospermum boreale subsp. ascendens, and its name and the name of the autonym are accepted by the Australian Plant Census:

- Conospermum boreale subsp. ascendens has ascending leaves.
- Conospermum boreale subsp. boreale has soft, spreading leaves.

== Distribution and habitat ==
This species of Conospermum is found between Kalbarri and Badgingarra, sometimes as far south as Perth, in the Avon Wheatbelt, Carnarvon, Geraldton Sandplains and Swan Coastal Plain bioregions of south-western Western Australia where it grows in sand or laterite. Subspecies ascendens is found as far north as Shark Bay and subsp. borealis is found as far south as Perth.

== Conservation status ==
Both subspecies of C. boreale are listed as "not threatened" by the Government of Western Australia Department of Parks and Wildlife.
