= Conospermum unilaterale =

Scientific classification
- Kingdom: Plantae
- Clade: Tracheophytes
- Clade: Angiosperms
- Clade: Eudicots
- Order: Proteales
- Family: Proteaceae
- Genus: Conospermum
- Species: C. unilaterale

Binomial name
- Conospermum unilaterale E.M.Benn.

Species of shrub native to Australia

Conospermum unilaterale is a species of flowering plant in the family Proteaceae and is endemic to the south-west of Western Australia. It is a compact or open shrub with spoon-shaped leaves, spike-like panicles of woolly, white, tube-shaped flowers and hairy nuts.

== Description ==
Conospermum unilaterale is a compact or open shrub that typically grows to a height of up to 70 cm (28 in). Its leaves are spoon-shaped, 12–48 mm (0.47–1.89 in) long, 0.7–2.5 mm (0.028–0.098 in) wide. The flowers are borne in spike-like panicles on a peduncle 80–350 mm (3.1–13.8 in) long with egg-shaped, glabrous bracteoles 2.2–4.0 mm (0.087–0.157 in) long and 2–3 mm (0.079–0.118 in) wide but with a woolly base. The flowers are white and woolly, forming a tube 6–10.5 mm (0.24–0.41 in) long, the upper lip 2.0–2.6 mm (0.079–0.102 in) long, 1.0–1.5 mm (0.039–0.059 in) wide and blue, the lower lip with narrowly oblong to oblong lobes 0.4–0.7 mm (0.016–0.028 in) long and 0.2–0.3 mm (0.0079–0.0118 in) wide. Flowering occurs from August to October, and the fruit is a nut about 1.8–2.7 mm (0.071–0.106 in) long and 1.6–2.8 mm (0.063–0.110 in) wide with golden, woolly hairs.

== Taxonomy ==
Conospermum unilaterale was first formally described in 1995 by Eleanor Marion Bennett in the Flora of Australia from specimens she collected near Lake Indoon in 1985. The specific epithet (unilaterale) means 'on one side' referring to the flowers mostly turned to one side of the branches.

== Distribution and habitat ==
This species of smokebush grows on sandplains and undulating sandhills, in the Badgingarra-Eneabba area in the Geraldton Sandplains bioregion of south-western Western Australia.

== Conservation status ==
Conospermum undulatum is listed as "not threatened" by the Government of Western Australia Department of Biodiversity, Conservation and Attractions.
