= Conospermum sigmoideum =

Conservation status
- Priority Two — Poorly Known Taxa (DEC)

Scientific classification
- Kingdom: Plantae
- Clade: Tracheophytes
- Clade: Angiosperms
- Clade: Eudicots
- Order: Proteales
- Family: Proteaceae
- Genus: Conospermum
- Species: C. sigmoideum

Binomial name
- Conospermum sigmoideum E.M.Benn.

Species of Australian shrub

Conospermum sigmoideum is a species of flowering plant in the family Proteaceae and is endemic to the south of Western Australia. It is an erect shrub with S-shaped leaves, circular in cross section, and spikes of 5 to 10, pale blue, tube-shaped flowers with deep blue bracteoles.

== Description ==
Conspermum sigmoideum is an erect shrub that typically grows to a height of 20–50 cm (7.9–19.7 in) and has few branches. Its leaves are S-shaped, circular in cross-section, 15–35 mm (0.59–1.38 in) long and 0.2–0.3 mm (0.0079–0.0118 in) wide with a few scattered hairs. The flowers are arranged in five to ten spikes on the ends of branchlets with an erect, leaf-like bract about 15 mm (0.59 in) long at the base of the spike. The bracteoles are deep blue, 2.0–2.25 mm (0.079–0.089 in) long and densely covered with woolly white hairs at the base. The flowers are pale blue and form a tube 5–6 mm (0.20–0.24 in) long and 1.0–1.5 mm (0.039–0.059 in) wide, the upper lip 2–3 mm (0.079–0.118 in) long, the lower lip joined at the base, each lobe narrowly oblong to oblong, 0.50–0.75 mm (0.020–0.030 in) long and 0.2–0.3 mm (0.0079–0.0118 in) wide. Flowering occurs in August and September.

== Taxonomy ==
Conspermum sigmoideum was first formally described in 1995 by Eleanor Marion Bennett in the Flora of Australia from specimens collected in Frank Hann National Park in 1978. The specific epithet (sigmoideum) refers to the shape of the leaves, resembling the Greek letter 'sigma' ("S").

== Distribution ==
This species of Conospermum is only known from the Frank Hann National Park in the Coolgardie and Mallee bioregions of southern Western Australia.

== Conservation status ==
Conospermum sigmoideum is listed as "Priority Two" by the Government of Western Australia Department of Biodiversity, Conservation and Attractions, meaning that it is poorly known and from one or a few locations.
