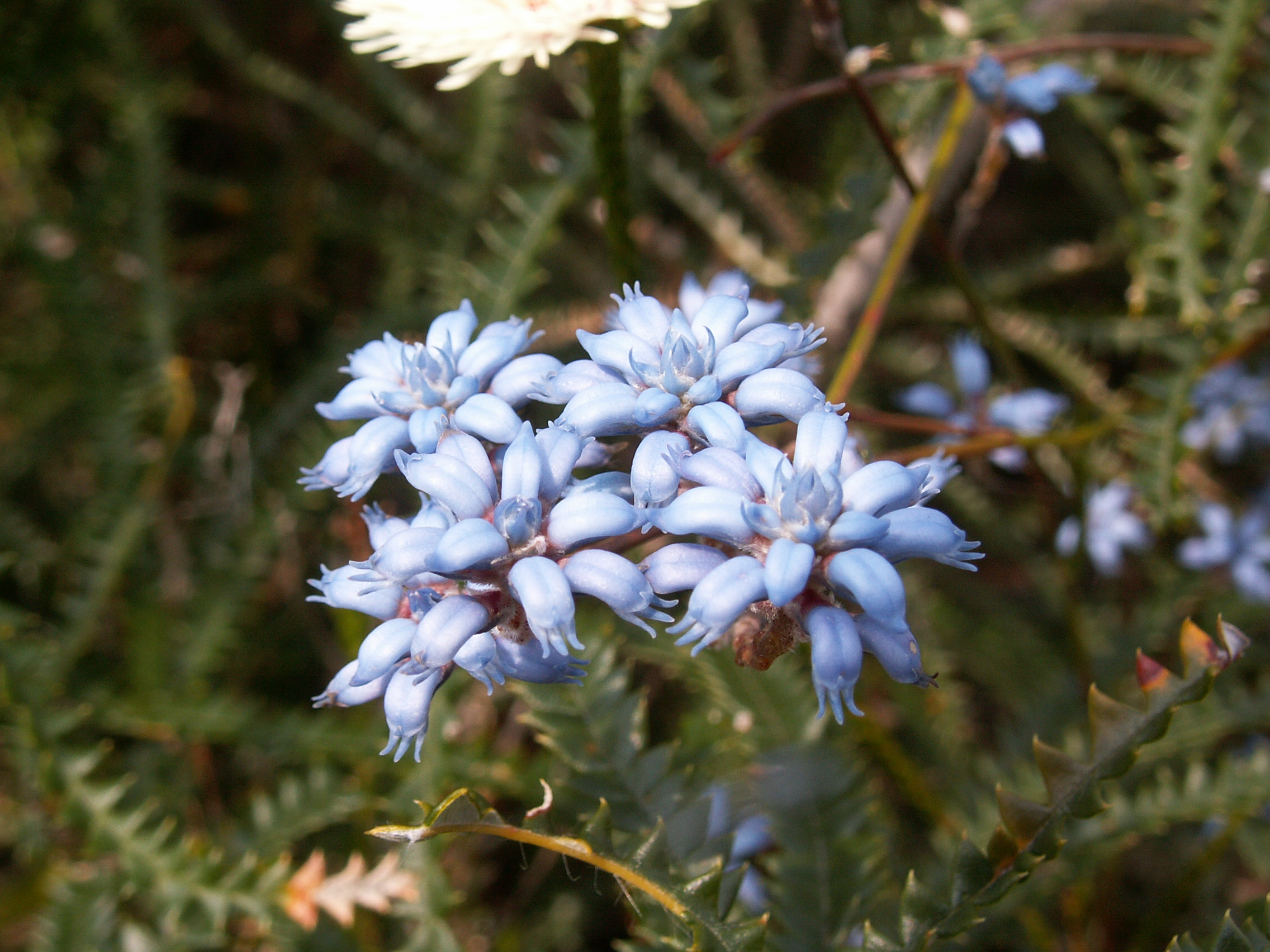

Scientific classification
- Kingdom: Plantae
- Clade: Tracheophytes
- Clade: Angiosperms
- Clade: Eudicots
- Order: Proteales
- Family: Proteaceae
- Genus: Conospermum
- Species: C. caeruleum

Binomial name
- Conospermum caeruleum R.Br.

Synonyms
- Connospermum coeruleum B.D.Jacks. orth. var.

= Conospermum caeruleum =

Blue brother

Species of Australian shrub

Conospermum caeruleum, commonly known as blue brother, is a species of flowering plant in the family Proteaceae and is endemic to the south west of Western Australia. It is a prostrate shrub with small, dense heads of blue, rarely pink flowers and usually grows in heavy soils subject to flooding.

== Description ==
It grows as a prostrate or straggly shrub usually growing to a height of about 0.5–1.0 metre (2–3 ft) and a spread of up to 2 metres (7 ft). The leaves are clustered at the base of the stem, have a stalk 5–60 millimetres (0.2–2 in) and a leaf blade that is thread-like to egg-shaped and 14–148 millimetres (0.6–6 in). The leaves have prominent veins and end abruptly in a sharp point. The flowers are arranged in dense clusters of up to 18 tube-like blue flowers, each about 5–8 millimetres (0.2–0.3 in) long. Flowers appear between July and October and are followed by the fruit which is a nut about 2 millimetres (0.08 in) long and 2–2.5 millimetres (0.08–0.1 in) wide.

== Taxonomy ==
Conospermum caeruleum was first formally described in 1810 by Robert Brown and the description was published in Transactions of the Linnean Society of London from a specimen collected near "King George's Sound, west coast of New Holland". The specific epithet (caeruleum) is a Latin word meaning "sky-blue".

Six subspecies are recognised by the Australian Plant Census as at November 2020:

- Conospermum caeruleum R.Br. subsp. caeruleum
- Conospermum caeruleum subsp. contortum E.M.Benn.
- Conospermum caeruleum subsp. debile (Kippist ex Meisn.) E.M.Benn.
- Conospermum caeruleum subsp. marginatum (Meisn.) E.M.Benn.
- Conospermum caeruleum subsp. oblanceolatum E.M.Benn.
- Conospermum caeruleum subsp. spathulatum Benth. E.M.Benn.

== Distribution and habitat ==
Conospermum caeruleum occurs from Busselton to east of Albany in the Avon Wheatbelt, Esperance, Geraldton Sandplains, Jarrah Forest, Mallee, Swan Coastal Plain and Warren biogeographical regions of Western Australia growing on sand, sandy peat, stony clay, laterite or granite in areas that are wet in winter.

== Use in horticulture ==
Conospermum species, especially the Western Australian ones are difficult to cultivate.

== Conservation status ==
Conospermum caeruleum is classified as "not threatened" by the Government of Western Australia Department of Parks and Wildlife.

== Gallery ==
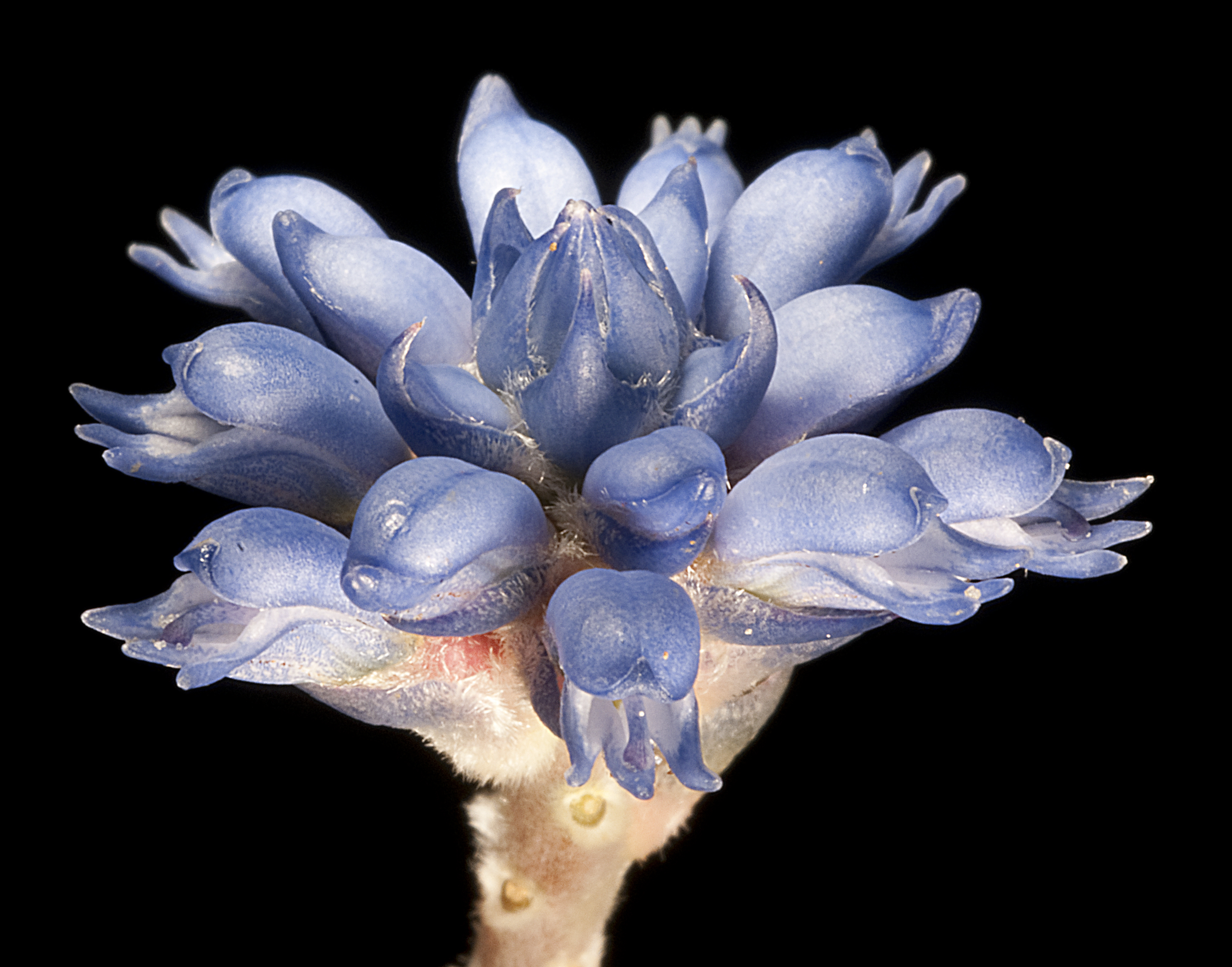
C. caeruleum subsp.caeruleum

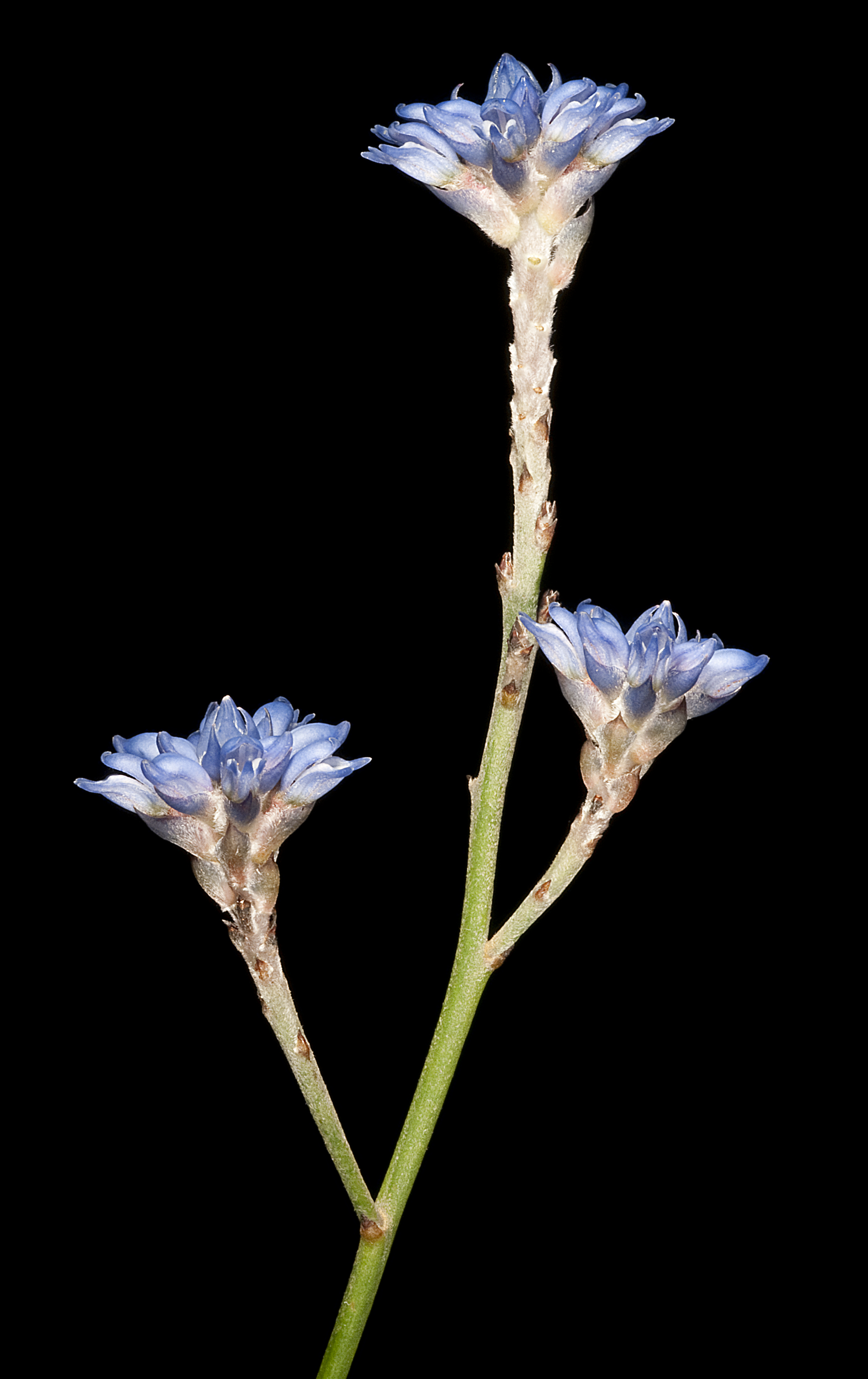
C. caeruleum subsp.caeruleum
