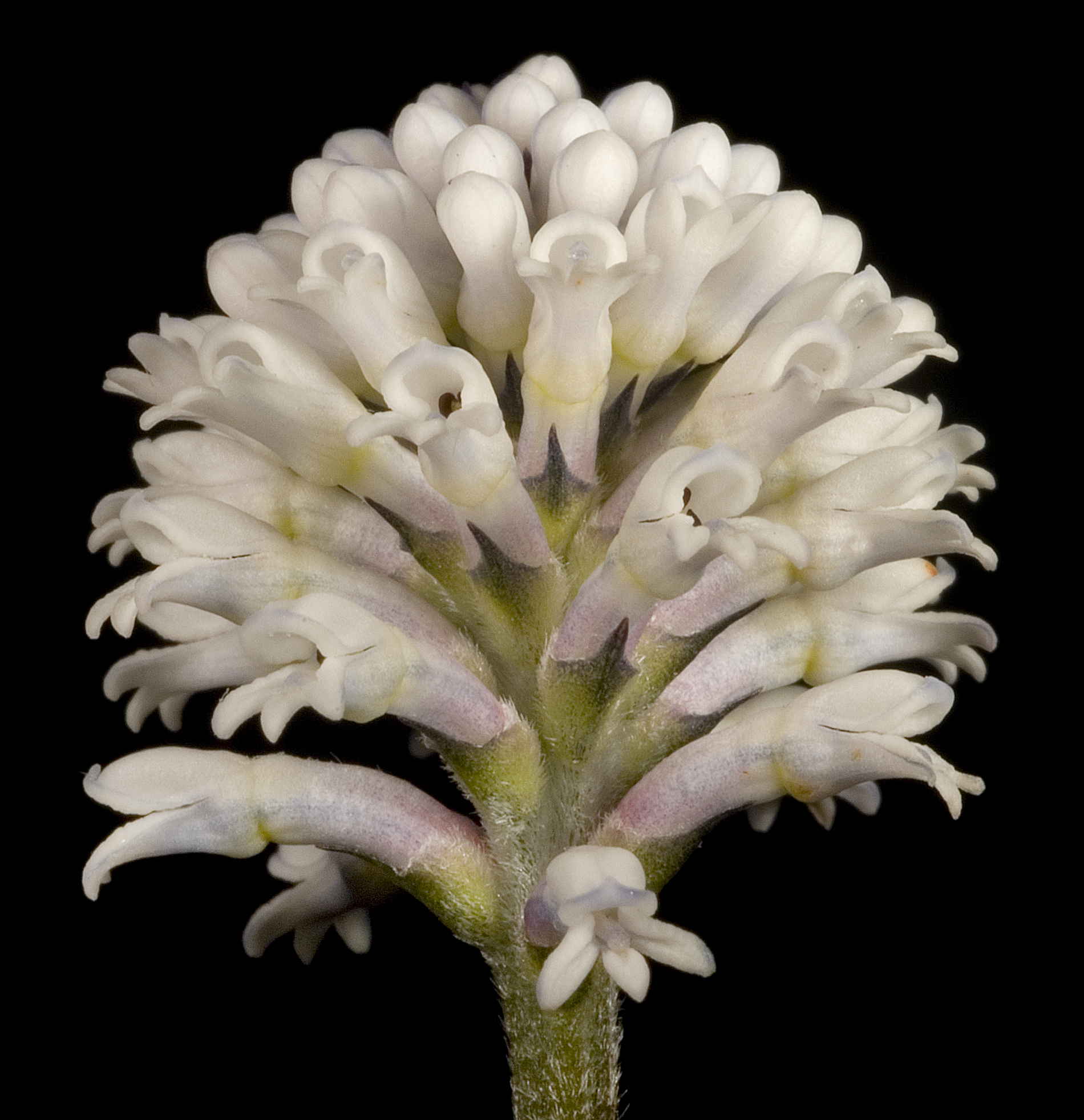

Scientific classification
- Kingdom: Plantae
- Clade: Tracheophytes
- Clade: Angiosperms
- Clade: Eudicots
- Order: Proteales
- Family: Proteaceae
- Genus: Conospermum
- Species: C. huegelii

Binomial name
- Conospermum huegelii R.Br. ex Endl.

Synonyms
- Conospermum intricatum Lindl. ex Meisn. nom. inval., pro syn.

= Conospermum huegelii =

Species of Australian shrub

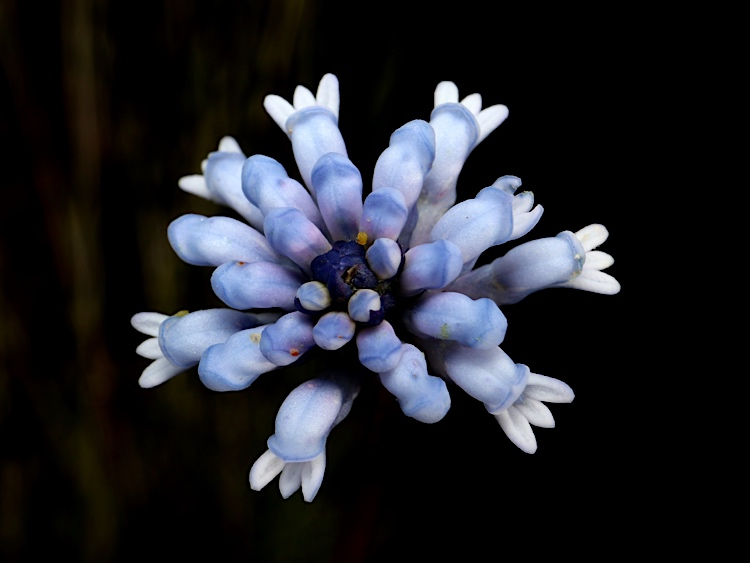
Blue form in Kalamunda National Park

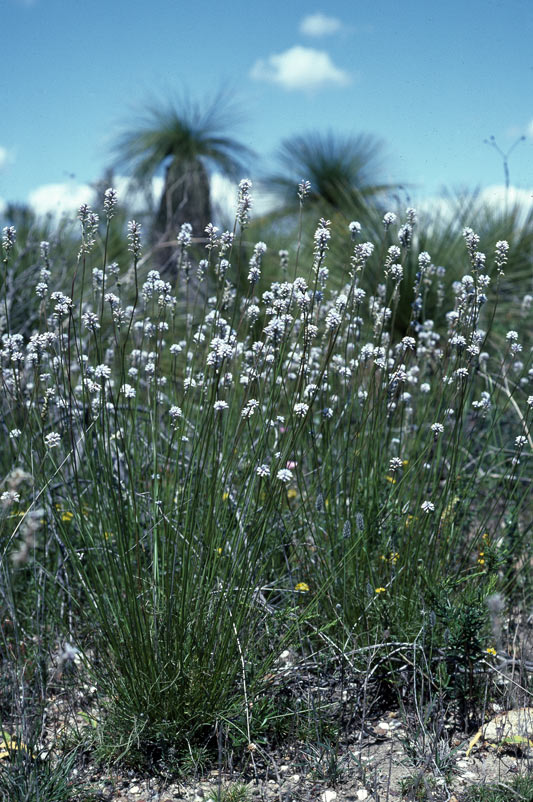
Habit, near the Zig-Zag Road

Conospermum huegelii, commonly known as the slender smokebush, is a species of flowering plant endemic to the south-west of Western Australia. It is a low, clumped shrub with thread-like to narrowly cylindrical leaves, and spikes of pale blue to cream-coloured, tube-shaped flowers and hairy nuts.

== Description ==
Conospermum huegelii is a low, clumped shrub that typically grows to a height of up to 0.4 m (1 ft 4 in), up to 1 m (3 ft 3 in) high when in flower, and does not form a lignotuber. Its leaves are upright, thread-like to narrowly cylindrical, 30–200 mm (1.2–7.9 in) long, .03–1.25 mm (0.0012–0.0492 in) wide and curved or spirally coiled. The flowers are spikes on the ends of branchlets on a peduncle 100–840 mm (3.9–33.1 in) long with egg-shaped, glabrous blue bracteoles. The flowers are pale blue to cream-coloured and form a tube 1.5–4.5 mm (0.059–0.177 in) long. The upper lip of the perianth is egg-shaped, 2.75–4.0 mm (0.108–0.157 in) long, 1.0–2.4 mm (0.039–0.094 in) wide, and curved backwards, the lower lip joined for 2.0–4.2 mm (0.079–0.165 in) with narrowly oblong lobes 0.6–1.5 mm (0.024–0.059 in) long and 0.4–0.5 mm (0.016–0.020 in) wide. Flowering occurs from July to October, and the fruit is a nut 2.0–2.9 mm (0.079–0.114 in) long and 2.0–2.5 mm (0.079–0.098 in) wide and covered with woolly golden brown to orange hairs.

== Taxonomy ==
Conospermum huegelii was first formally described in 1838 by the botanist Stephan Endlicher from an unpublished description of Robert Brown. Endlicher's description was published in Stirpium Australasicarum Herbarii Hugeliani Decades Tres from specimens collected near the Swan River Colony by Charles von Hügel. The specific epithet honours the botanist Karl von Hugel.

== Distribution and habitat ==
Slender smokebush is found in swampy areas and among granite outcrops in the Swan Coastal Plain and in the Darling Range of Western Australia where it grows in sandy-gravelly soils in the Jarrah Forest and Swan Coastal Plain bioregions of south-western Western Australia.

== Use in horticulture ==
This attractive ornamental plant is suitable for gardens or containers. The flowers are used for decoration and are long lasting. It is reasonably difficult to establish, propagation is by cuttings and can be sown by seed.
