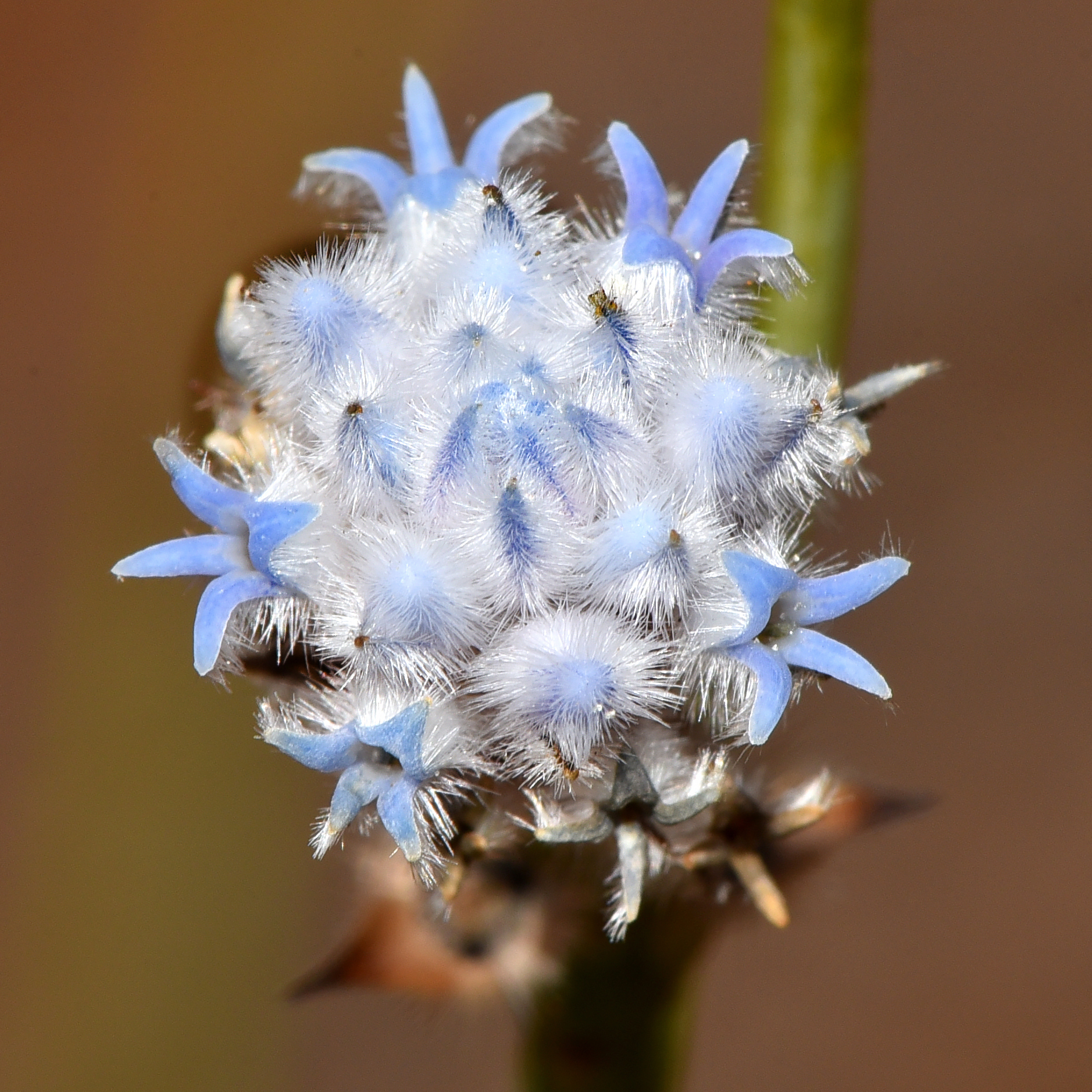

Conservation status
- Priority Three — Poorly Known Taxa (DEC)

Scientific classification
- Kingdom: Plantae
- Clade: Tracheophytes
- Clade: Angiosperms
- Clade: Eudicots
- Order: Proteales
- Family: Proteaceae
- Genus: Conospermum
- Species: C. scaposum

Binomial name
- Conospermum scaposum Benth.

Synonyms
- Conospermum sericeum C.A.Gardner

= Conospermum scaposum =

Species of Australian shrub

Conospermum scaposum is a species of flowering plant in the family Proteaceae and is endemic to the south-west of Western Australia. It is a low, erect shrub with linear leaves and dense spikes of blue, tube-shaped flowers covered with long, silky hairs.

== Description ==
Conspermum scaposum is a low, erect shrub that typically grows to a height of up to 75 cm (30 in) when in flower, otherwise to 15 cm (5.9 in). Its leaves are linear, 40–100 mm (1.6–3.9 in) long, 2.0–5.5 mm (0.079–0.217 in) wide on a petiole 25–88 mm (0.98–3.46 in) long. The leaves are glabrous, sometimes covered with velvety hairs. The flowers are arranged in panicles with few branches, each branch on a peduncle 300–750 mm (12–30 in) long, forming a dense spike on the ends of branches. The bracteoles are creamy brown, 4.5–6 mm (0.18–0.24 in) long and 1–2 mm (0.039–0.079 in) wide and covered with velvety white hairs. The flowers are blue and form a tube 2–6 mm (0.079–0.236 in) long, covered with long, silky hairs. The perianth tube is 2–6 mm (0.079–0.236 in) long, the upper lip 2.0–2.25 mm (0.079–0.089 in) long and 1.0–1.5 mm (0.039–0.059 in) wide, the upper lobe 1.5–2.0 mm (0.059–0.079 in) long and 0.25–0.5 mm (0.0098–0.0197 in) wide, the lower lip 1.5–2.0 mm (0.059–0.079 in) long and 0.25–0.5 mm (0.0098–0.0197 in) wide. Flowering occurs in August, January and February.

== Taxonomy ==
Conospermum scaposum was first formally described in 1870 by George Bentham in his Flora Australiensis from specimens collected by James Drummond. The specific epithet (scaposum) means 'abounding in flower stalks'.

== Distribution and habitat ==
This species of Conospermum grows in low, swampy areas and on road verges from Mogumber to Lancelin and Toolibin in the Avon Wheatbelt, Geraldton Sandplains, Jarrah Forest and Swan Coastal Plain bioregions of south-western Western Australia.

== Conservation status ==
Conospermum scaposum is listed as "Priority Three" by the Government of Western Australia Department of Biodiversity, Conservation and Attractions meaning that it is poorly known and known from only a few locations but is not under imminent threat.
