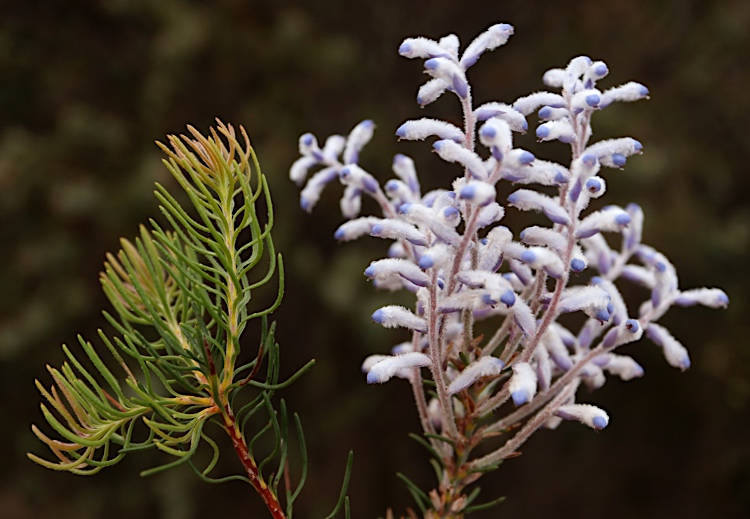

Conservation status
- Priority Two — Poorly Known Taxa (DEC)

Scientific classification
- Kingdom: Plantae
- Clade: Tracheophytes
- Clade: Angiosperms
- Clade: Eudicots
- Order: Proteales
- Family: Proteaceae
- Genus: Conospermum
- Species: C. spectabile

Binomial name
- Conospermum spectabile E.M.Benn.

= Conospermum spectabile =

Species of Australian shrub

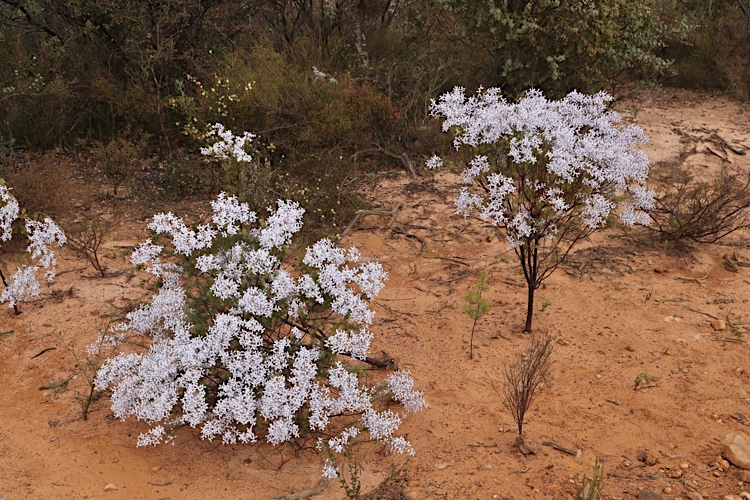
Habit in the Stirling Range National Park

Conospermum spectabile is a species of flowering plant in the family Proteaceae and is endemic to the south-west of Western Australia. It is an erect, compact shrub with S-shaped leaves that are circular in cross section, and panicles of woolly white and blue, tube-shaped flowers.

== Description ==
Conspermum spectabile is an erect, compact shrub that typically grows to a height of up to 80 cm (31 in). Its leaves are S-shaped, circular in cross-section, 15–22 mm (0.59–0.87 in) long and 0.2–0.4 mm (0.0079–0.0157 in) wide with scattered hairs. The flowers are arranged in panicles on the ends of branches, with D-shaped bracteoles 4.5–7 mm (0.18–0.28 in) long, 3–4 mm (0.12–0.16 in) wide and glabrous. The flowers are white and blue, forming a tube 7–10 mm (0.28–0.39 in) long, covered with woolly hairs. The upper lip is broadly egg-shaped, 1.0–1.5 mm (0.039–0.059 in) long and 2.5–3.0 mm (0.098–0.118 in) wide, the upper lobe 1.5–2.0 mm (0.059–0.079 in) long and 0.25–0.5 mm (0.0098–0.0197 in) wide. The lower lip is joined for 0.7–1 mm (0.028–0.039 in) long, with lobes 0.25–0.50 mm (0.0098–0.0197 in) long and 1–2 mm (0.039–0.079 in) wide. Flowering occurs from October to November.

== Taxonomy ==
Conospermum spectabile was first formally described in 1995 in the Flora of Australia from specimens collected by Charles Gardner in the Stirling Range in 1934. The specific epithet (spectabile) means 'remarkable' or 'spectacular'.

== Distribution and habitat ==
This species of Conospermum is restricted to the Stirling Range in the Avon Wheatbelt and Esperance Plains bioregions of south-western Western Australia, where it grows in sandy soils.

== Conservation status ==
Conospermum spectabile is listed as "Priority Two" by the Government of Western Australia Department of Biodiversity, Conservation and Attractions, meaning that it is poorly known and from one or a few locations.
