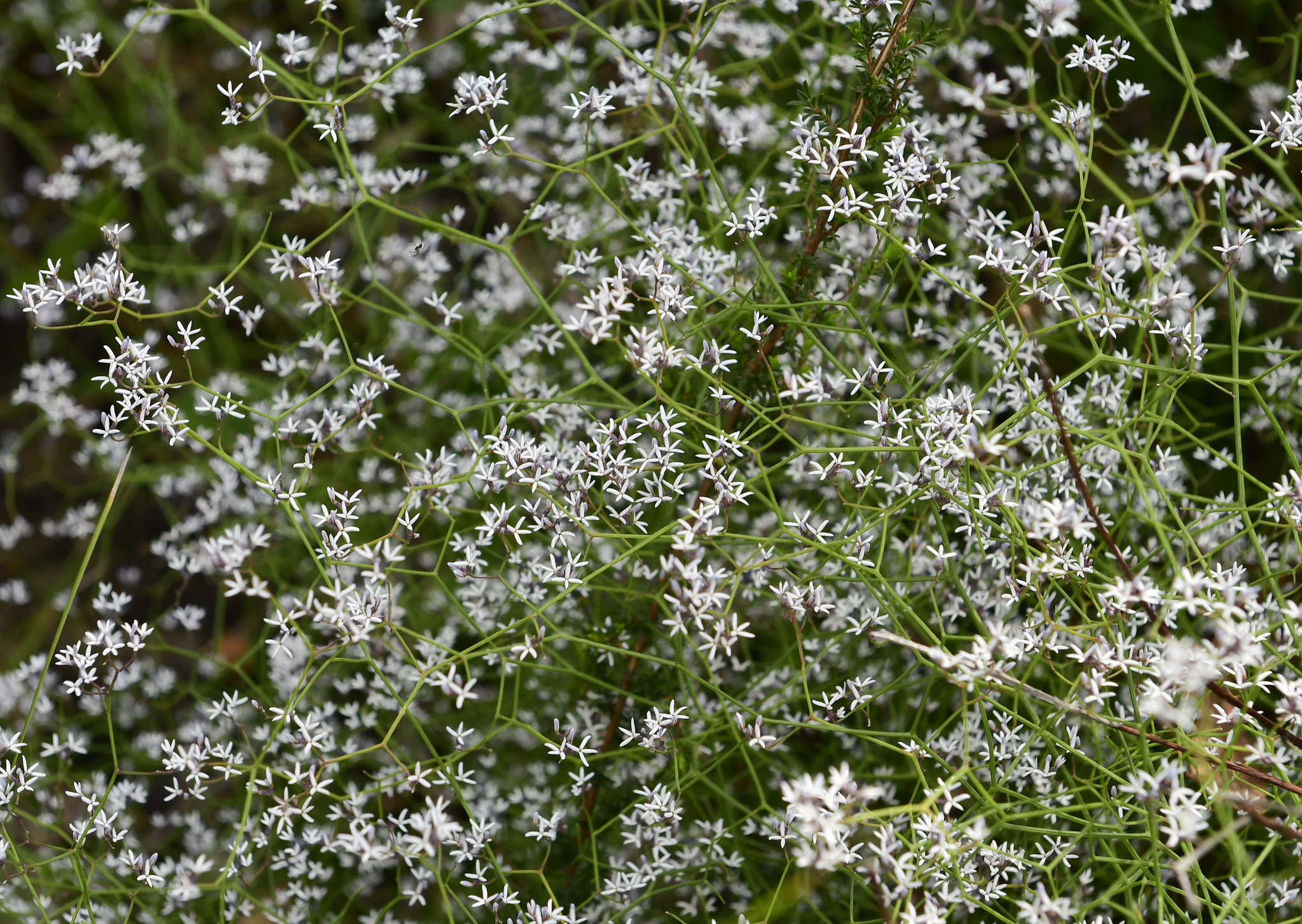

Scientific classification
- Kingdom: Plantae
- Clade: Tracheophytes
- Clade: Angiosperms
- Clade: Eudicots
- Order: Proteales
- Family: Proteaceae
- Genus: Conospermum
- Species: C. paniculatum

Binomial name
- Conospermum paniculatum E.M.Benn.

= Conospermum paniculatum =

Species of Australian shrub

Conospermum paniculatum is a species of flowering plant in the family Proteaceae and is endemic to the south-west of Western Australia. It is an erect, much-branched shrub with spoon shaped to egg-shaped leaves with the narrower end towards the base, and spikes of blue to pink, tube-shaped flowers, the fruit an urn-shaped nut.

== Description ==
Conospermum paniculatum is a spreading, open shrub that typically grows to a height of 0.3–1.25 m (1 ft 0 in – 4 ft 1 in). It has spoon-shaped or very narrowly egg-shaped leaves, 50–210 mm (2.0–8.3 in) long and 5–15 mm (0.20–0.59 in) wide, with the narrower end towards the base. The flowers are arranged in racemose panicles up to 115 cm (45 in) long, with heads of 3 to 7 flowers. The heads are borne on a peduncle 20–25 mm (0.79–0.98 in) long with velvety white and rust-coloured hairs. The flowers are white to pale blue and form a tube 2.0–3.5 mm (0.079–0.138 in) long with narrowly oblong lobes 1.75–3 mm (0.069–0.118 in) long and 0.75–1.0 mm (0.030–0.039 in) wide. Flowering occurs in July and from September to November, and the fruit is a woolly hairy, urn-shaped nut about 1.5 mm (0.059 in) long and 1.25 mm (0.049 in) wide.

== Taxonomy ==
Conospermum paniculatum was first formally described in 1995 by Eleanor Marion Bennett in the Flora of Australia from specimens she collected on the Scott River Road in 1985. The specific epithet (paniculatum) means 'paniculate'.

== Distribution and habitat ==
This species of Conospermum grows in swampy places, on plains and on slopes between Busselton and Scott River in the Jarrah Forest, Swan Coastal Plain and Warren bioregions of south-western Western Australia.
