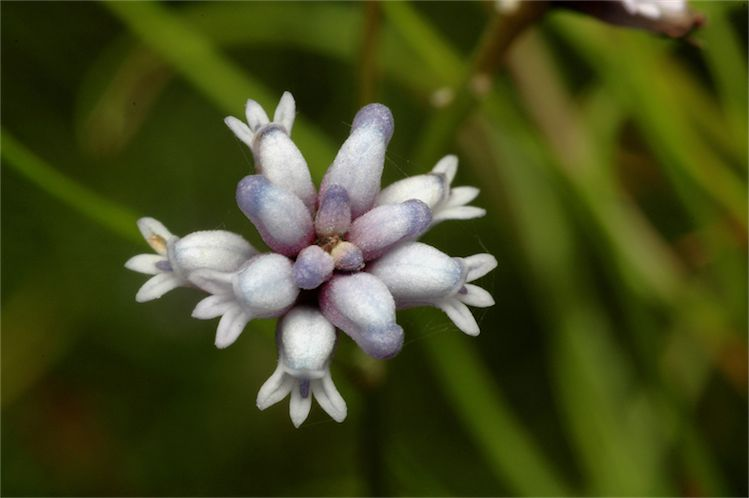

Scientific classification
- Kingdom: Plantae
- Clade: Tracheophytes
- Clade: Angiosperms
- Clade: Eudicots
- Order: Proteales
- Family: Proteaceae
- Genus: Conospermum
- Species: C. tenuifolium

Binomial name
- Conospermum tenuifolium R.Br.

= Conospermum tenuifolium =

Species of Australian shrub

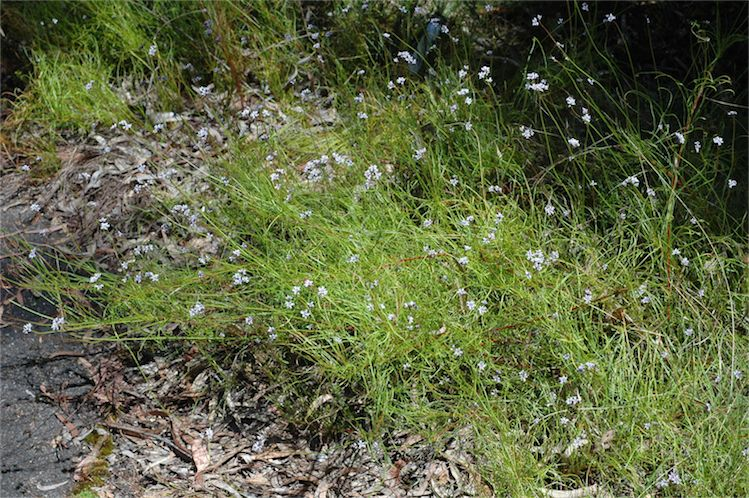
Habit in the ANBG

Conospermum tenuifolium, commonly known as sprawling smoke-bush or slender wire lily, is a flowering plant of the family Proteaceae and is endemic to New South Wales. It is a low shrub with linear to lance-shaped leaves, panicles of pinkish white to mauve flowers and nuts with velvety white hairs.

== Description ==
Conospermum ericifolium is a low shrub that typically grows up to 60 cm (24 in) high and 4 m (13 ft) wide. Its leaves are mostly arranged at the base of the plant, linear to lance-shaped with the narrower end towards the base, 40–200 mm (1.6–7.9 in) long, 0.5–4.2 mm (0.020–0.165 in) wide and round or slightly flattened in cross section. The flowers are arranged in panicles or in a spike on the ends of branches, on hairy peduncles 20–35 mm (0.79–1.38 in) long. The bracteoles are egg-shaped, 1.5–2.9 mm (0.059–0.114 in) long and 1.5–2.8 mm (0.059–0.110 in) wide. The perianth is pinkish white to mauve, forming a tube 1.5–4 mm (0.059–0.157 in) long. The upper lip is egg-shaped, 3–4 mm (0.12–0.16 in) long, 1.5–1.8 mm (0.059–0.071 in) wide and hairy, the lower lip joined for 2.6–3.5 mm (0.10–0.14 in) with oblong to broadly oblong lobes 0.5–1 mm (0.020–0.039 in) long and 0.5–0.6 mm (0.020–0.024 in) wide. Flowering occurs in spring, and the fruit is a nut 2.0–2.2 mm (0.079–0.087 in) long and 1.4–2.0 mm (0.055–0.079 in) wide, with white hairs.

== Taxonomy ==
Conospermum tenuifolium was first formally described in 1810 by Robert Brown in Transactions of the Linnean Society of London from specimens collected near Port Jackson. The specific epithet (tenuifolium) means 'thin-' or 'narrow-flowered'.

== Distribution and habitat ==
Sprawling smoke-bush often grows in damp places in heath and woodland on ridges, slopes and creek banks, and is widespread on the Central Coast, near Nowra on the South Coast, and on the Blue Mountains.
