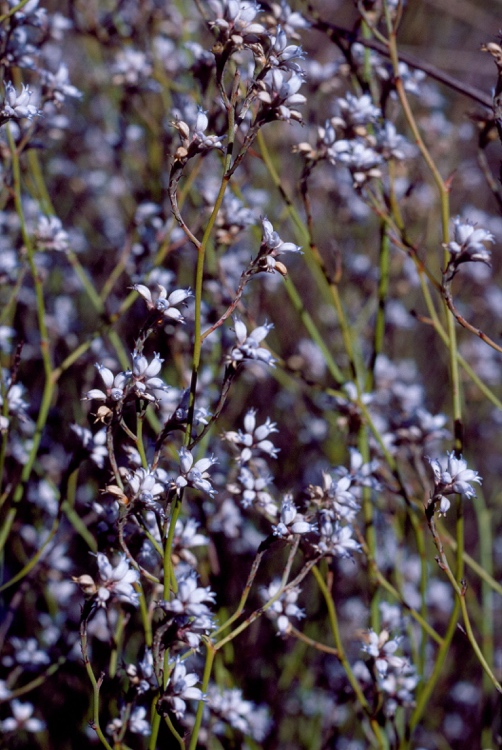

Scientific classification
- Kingdom: Plantae
- Clade: Tracheophytes
- Clade: Angiosperms
- Clade: Eudicots
- Order: Proteales
- Family: Proteaceae
- Genus: Conospermum
- Species: C. polycephalum

Binomial name
- Conospermum polycephalum Meisn.

Synonyms
- Conospermum polycephalum Meisn. var. polycephalum

= Conospermum polycephalum =

Species of flowering plant

Conospermum polycephalum is a species of flowering plant in the family Proteaceae and is endemic to the south-west of Western Australia. It is a spindly or semi-prostrate shrub with dense, thread-like leaves at the base of the plant, and panicles of white, pink or blue, tube-shaped flowers, the fruit a hairy, cream-coloured nut.

== Description ==
Conospermum polycephalum is a spindly or semi-prostrate shrub that typically grows to a height of 30–75 cm (12–30 in), sometimes to 1 m (3 ft 3 in). It has dense, thread-like leaves, 12–200 mm (0.47–7.87 in) long and 0.5–1 mm (0.020–0.039 in) wide at the base of the stem. The flowers are arranged in panicles on a peduncle 50–70 mm (2.0–2.8 in) long, with bluish-green egg-shaped bracteoles 3–4 mm (0.12–0.16 in) long and 2–4 mm (0.079–0.157 in) wide on the peduncle. The flowers are white, pink or blue, and form a tube 2.5–3.5 mm (0.098–0.138 in) long. The upper lip is elliptic to egg-shaped, 3–5 mm (0.12–0.20 in) long and 1.5–3 mm (0.059–0.118 in) wide and the lower lip linear to elliptic, 2–4 mm (0.079–0.157 in) long and 0.25–0.5 mm (0.0098–0.0197 in) wide. Flowering occurs from July to September, and the fruit is a cream-coloured nut with rust-coloured hairs, 2.0–2.5 mm (0.079–0.098 in) long and 2.5–2.75 mm (0.098–0.108 in) wide.

== Taxonomy ==
Conospermum polycephalum was first formally described in 1848 by Carl Meissner in Lehmann's Plantae Preissianae from specimens collected near the Swan River by James Drummond. The specific epithet (polycephalum) means 'many-headed'.

== Distribution and habitat ==
This species of Conospermum is found from north of Perth to Wubin in the Avon Wheatbelt, Geraldton Sandplains, Jarrah Forest and Swan Coastal Plain bioregions of south-western Western Australia, where it grows in gravelly soil.
