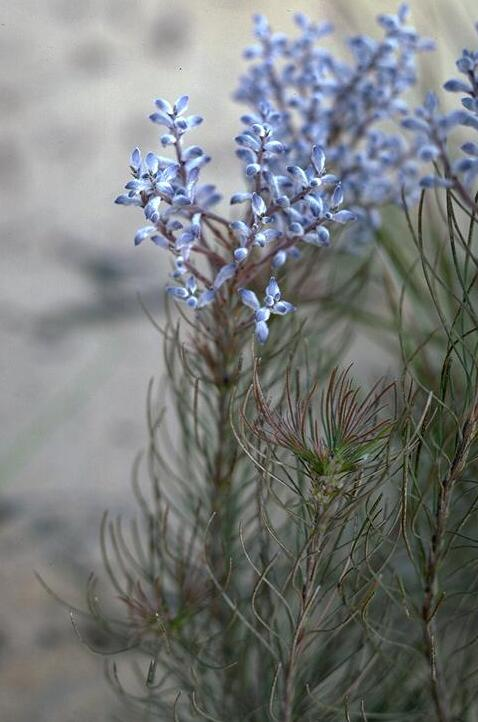

Scientific classification
- Kingdom: Plantae
- Clade: Tracheophytes
- Clade: Angiosperms
- Clade: Eudicots
- Order: Proteales
- Family: Proteaceae
- Genus: Conospermum
- Species: C. filifolium

Binomial name
- Conospermum filifolium Meisn.

= Conospermum filifolium =

Species of shrub native to Australia

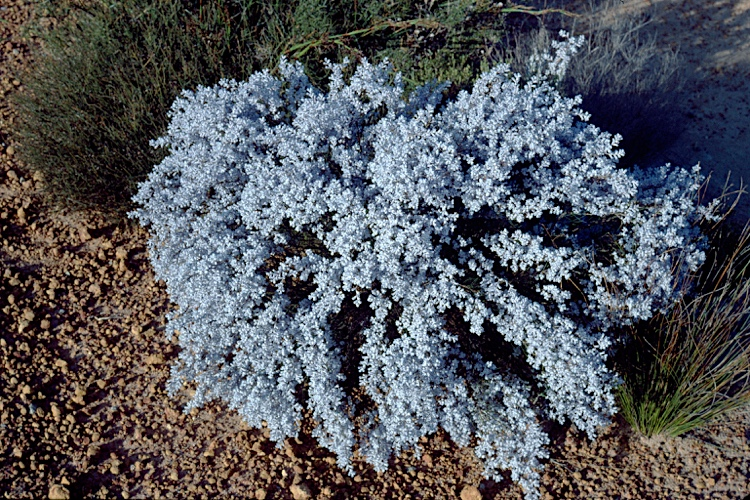
Habit

Conospermum filifolium is a species of flowering plant in the family Proteaceae and is endemic to the south-west of Western Australia. It is a shrub with thread-like, S-shaped leaves, and spike-like panicles of woolly white, occasionally blue, tube-shaped flowers.

== Description ==
Conospermum filifolium is a shrub that typically grows up to 80 cm (31 in) tall. It has ascending, thread-like, usually more or less S-shaped leaves 20–85 mm (0.79–3.35 in) long and 0.3–0.7 mm (0.012–0.028 in) wide. The flowers are arranged in narrow, spike-like panicles with egg-shaped, blue bracteoles 2–4 mm (0.079–0.157 in) long and 0.7–1.8 mm (0.028–0.071 in) wide. The perianth is woolly and white, occasionally blue, forming a tube 2.5–7 mm (0.098–0.276 in) long. The upper lip is egg-shaped, 2.0–3.2 mm (0.079–0.126 in) long and 0.7–1.8 mm (0.028–0.071 in) wide, the lower lip joined for 1.5–2.5 mm (0.059–0.098 in) with lobes 0.5–0.6 mm (0.020–0.024 in) long and 0.15–0.3 mm (0.0059–0.0118 in) wide. Flowering time depends on subspecies.

== Taxonomy ==
Conospermum filifolium was first formally described in 1845 by Carl Meissner in Lehmann's Plantae Preissianae from specimen collected near the Swan River by James Drummond. The specific epithet (filifolium) means 'thread-leaved'.

=== Subspecies ===
In 1995, Eleanor Marion Bennett described two subspecies of Conospermum filifolium in the Flora of Australia, and the names are accepted by the Australian Plant Census:

- Conospermum filifolium subsp. australe E.M.Benn. has S-shaped, more or less spreading leaves and a perianth with a glabrous upper lip and flowers from August to October.
- Conospermum filifolium Meisn. subsp. filifolium has leaves that are more or less pressed against the stem, and a perianth with velvety or soft hairs on the upper lip, and flowers from August to November.

== Distribution and habitat ==
This species of Conospermum is widespread on sand plain areas from south of Perth to Ravensthorpe in the Avon Wheatbelt, Esperance Plains, Jarrah Forest, Mallee and Swan Coastal Plain bioregions. Subspecies australe occurs from the Stirling Range south-east to Ravensthorpe and subsp. filifolium occurs inland between Perth and Albany

== Conservation status ==
Both subspecies of C. filifolium are listed as "not threatened" by the Government of Western Australia Department of Biodiversity, Conservation and Attractions.
