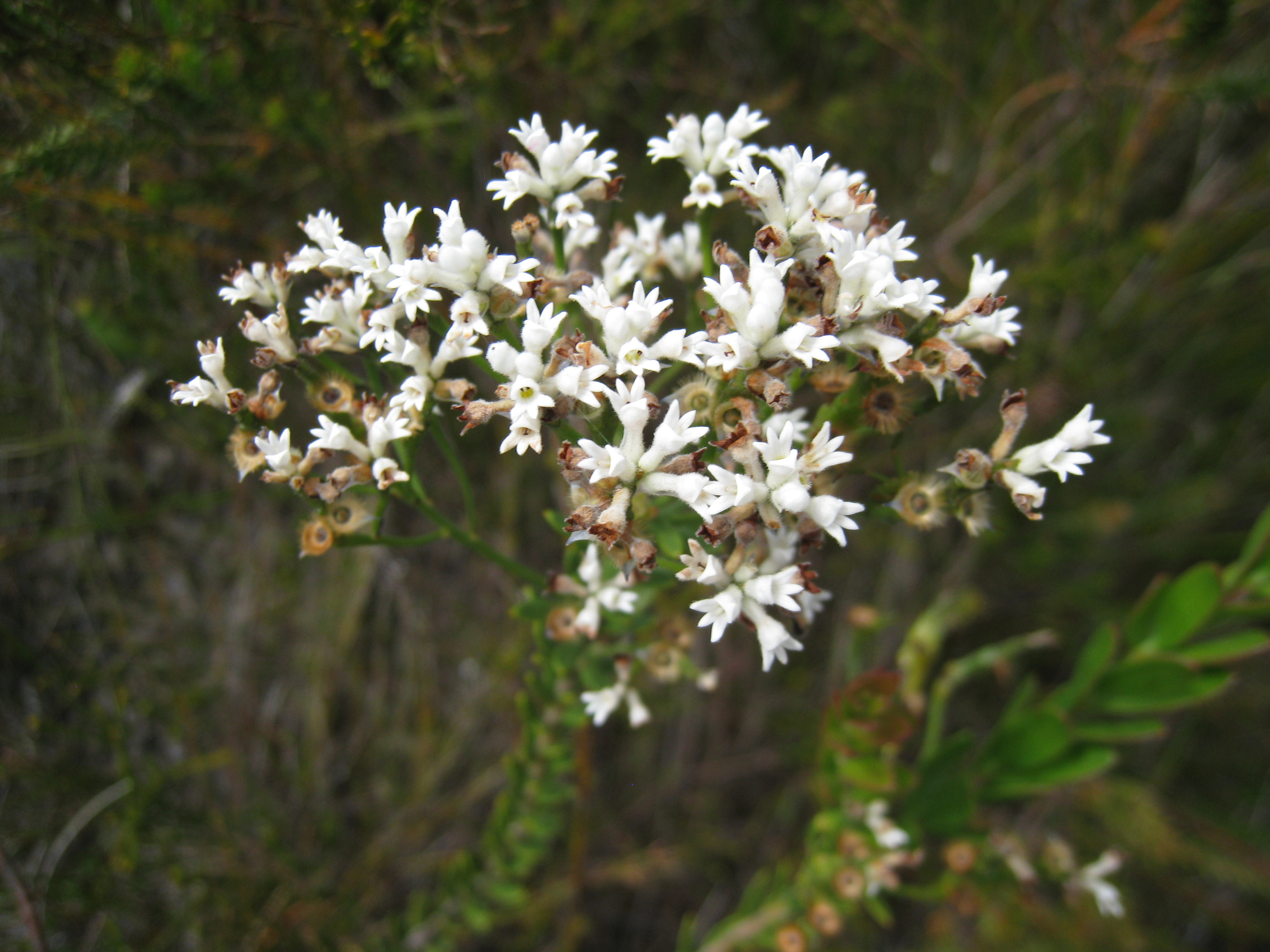

Scientific classification
- Kingdom: Plantae
- Clade: Tracheophytes
- Clade: Angiosperms
- Clade: Eudicots
- Order: Proteales
- Family: Proteaceae
- Genus: Conospermum
- Species: C. ellipticum

Binomial name
- Conospermum ellipticum Sm.

= Conospermum ellipticum =

Species of Australian shrub

Conospermum ellipticum is a species of flowering plant in family Proteaceae and is endemic to New South Wales. It is an erect shrub with hairy, elliptic leaves, panicles of cream-coloured to white flowers and golden, hairy nuts.

== Description ==
Conospermum ellipticum is an erect shrub that typically grows to a height of 50–80 cm (20–31 in) and has wand-like branches, sometimes covered with woolly hairs. The leaves are erect to spreading, elliptic to egg-shaped with the narrower end towards the base, 5–25 mm (0.20–0.98 in) long and 3–8 mm (0.12–0.31 in) wide with a tapering tip. The flowers are arranged in panicles on a white, hairy peduncle 15–26 mm (0.59–1.02 in) long with bracteoles 3–4 mm (0.12–0.16 in) long and 2.5–3.0 mm (0.098–0.118 in) wide. The perianth is densely covered with soft, white hairs and joined at the base to form a tube 3.5–4.0 mm (0.14–0.16 in) long. The upper lobe is egg-shaped, sac-like, densely covered with soft, white hairs, 1.5–2.1 mm (0.059–0.083 in) long and 1.5–1.75 mm (0.059–0.069 in) long. The lower lip is joined for 1.0–1.25 mm (0.039–0.049 in) with lobes 1.25–1.75 mm (0.049–0.069 in) long and 0.5–0.75 mm (0.020–0.030 in) wide. Flowering occurs in spring, and the fruit is a nut 2–3 mm (0.079–0.118 in) long and covered with golden hairs.

== Taxonomy ==
Conospermum ellipticum was first formally described in 1808 by James Edward Smith in The Cyclopaedia from specimens collected by John White. The specific epithet (ellipticum) means 'elliptic'.

== Distribution and habitat ==
This species of Conospermum grows in wet heath on shallow sandy soil on sandstone, mainly in coastal areas between Broken Bay and Jervis Bay.
