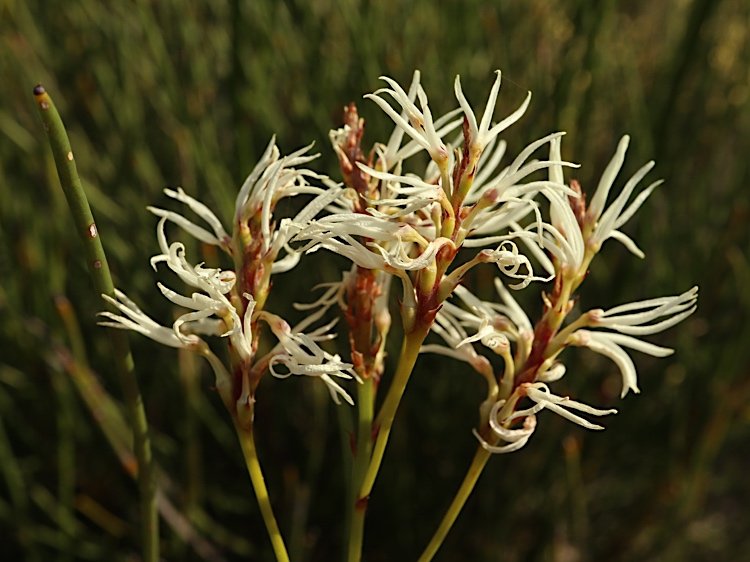

Scientific classification
- Kingdom: Plantae
- Clade: Tracheophytes
- Clade: Angiosperms
- Clade: Eudicots
- Order: Proteales
- Family: Proteaceae
- Genus: Conospermum
- Species: C. teretifolium

Binomial name
- Conospermum teretifolium R.Br.

= Conospermum teretifolium =

Species of Australian shrub

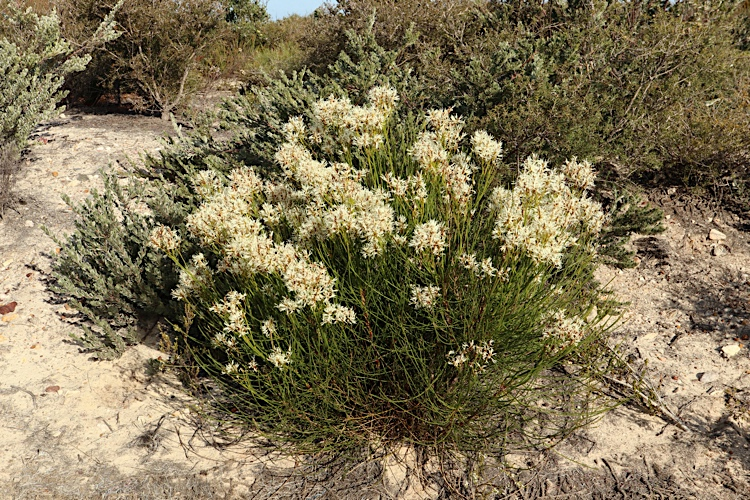
Habit in the Fitzgerald River National Park

Conospermum teretifolium, commonly known as the spider smokebush, is a species of flowering plant in the family Proteaceae and is endemic to the south of Western Australia. It is an erect shrub with leaves that are circular in cross section, panicles of creamy white, tube-shaped flowers and the fruit is a hairy nut.

== Description ==
Conspermum teretifolium is an erect shrub that typically grows to a height of 0.6–2 m (2 ft 0 in – 6 ft 7 in). Its leaves are circular in cross-section and pointed on the end, 40–43 mm (1.6–1.7 in) long and 0.8–2.5 mm (0.031–0.098 in) wide with scattered hairs. The flowers are arranged in panicles with many branches in the upper leaves, with egg-shaped bracteoles 3.0–5.5 mm (0.12–0.22 in) long, 2–4 mm (0.079–0.157 in) wide and hairy. The flowers are creamy white, forming a tube 7–11 mm (0.28–0.43 in) long, with lobes 9–17 mm (0.35–0.67 in) long and 0.8–1.5 mm (0.031–0.059 in) wide. Flowering occurs from October to January and in March, and the fruit is a nut 2.5–4 mm (0.098–0.157 in) long and 1.5–3 mm (0.059–0.118 in) wide with cream-coloured to velvety rust-coloured hairs.

== Taxonomy ==
Conospermum teretifolium was first formally described in 1810 by Robert Brown in the Transactions of the Linnean Society of London. The specific epithet (teretifolium) means 'terete-leaved'.

== Distribution and habitat ==
Spider smokebush grows along the south coast between Albany and the east of Esperance in the Esperance Plains, Jarrah Forest, Mallee, Swan Coastal Plain and Warren bioregions of south-western Western Australia.

== Conservation status ==
Conospermum spectabile is listed as "not threatened" by the Government of Western Australia Department of Biodiversity, Conservation and Attractions.
