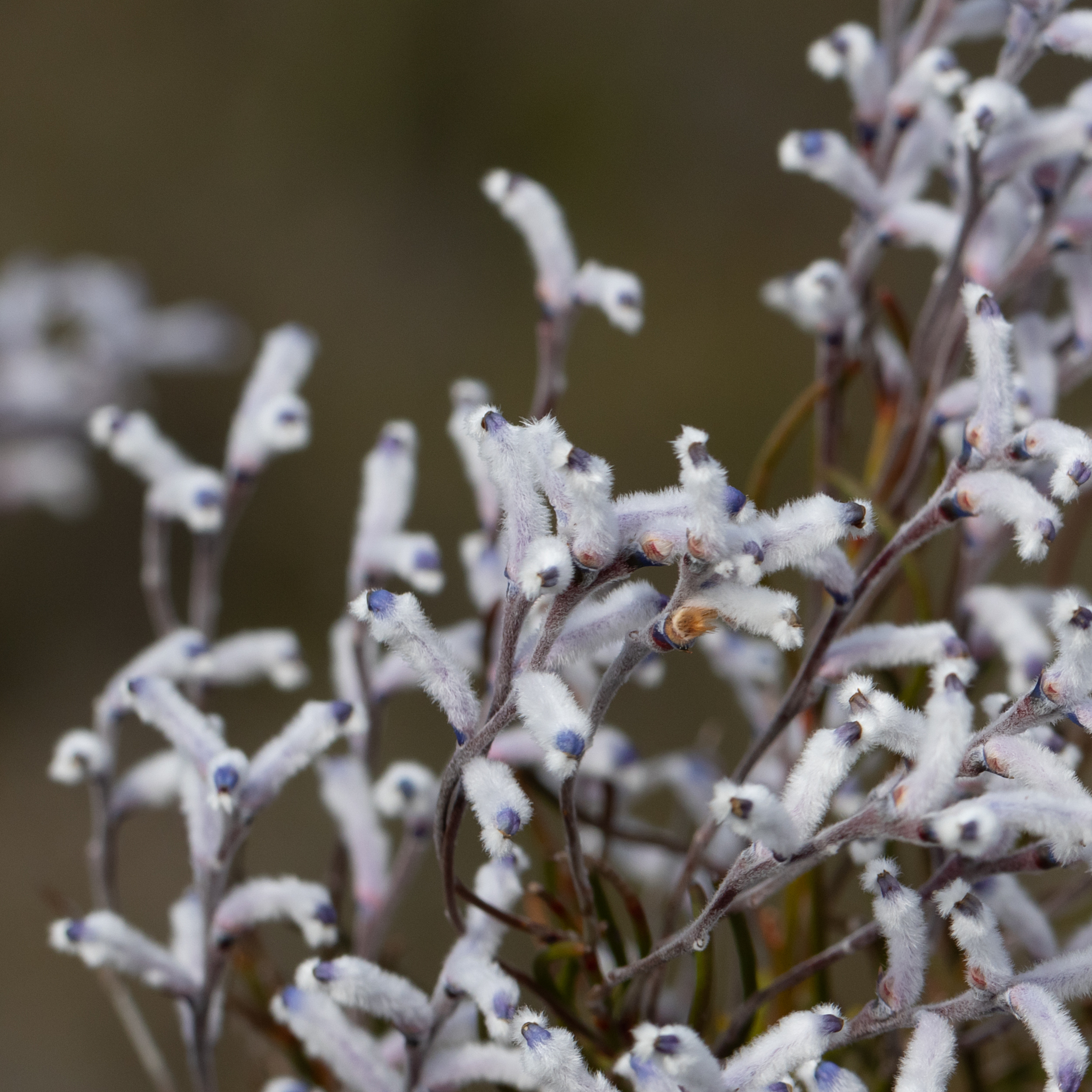

Scientific classification
- Kingdom: Plantae
- Clade: Tracheophytes
- Clade: Angiosperms
- Clade: Eudicots
- Order: Proteales
- Family: Proteaceae
- Genus: Conospermum
- Species: C. distichum

Binomial name
- Conospermum distichum R.Br.

= Conospermum distichum =

Species of shrub native to Australia

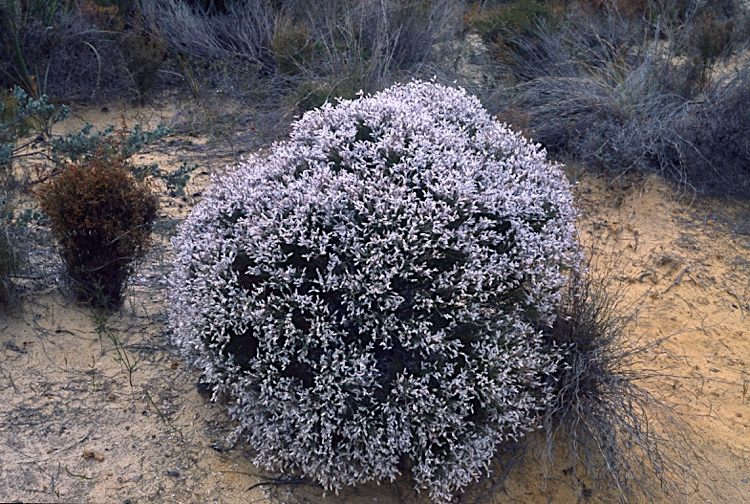
Habit in Cape Le Grand National Park

Conospermum distichum is a species of flowering plant in the family Proteaceae and is endemic to the south-west of Western Australia. It is a shrub with ascending, thread-like leaves, and spikes of woolly white, tube-shaped flowers with blue bracteoles.

== Description ==
Conospermum distichum is a shrub that typically grows to a height of up to 80 cm (31 in). It has scattered, ascending, glabrous, thread-like leaves 35–85 mm (1.4–3.3 in) long and 0.4–0.75 mm (0.016–0.030 in) wide at the base of the plant. The flowers are arranged in spikes in upper leaf axils on a peduncle 15–70 mm (0.59–2.76 in) long. The bracteoles are blue, egg-shaped, 2.2–3.2 mm (0.087–0.126 in) long, 1.7–2.5 mm (0.067–0.098 in) wide, and hairy at the sides and base. The perianth is white, forming a tube 4.0–7.5 mm (0.16–0.30 in) long. The upper lip is blue, egg-shaped, 1.8–3 mm (0.071–0.118 in) long and 1.0–1.7 mm (0.039–0.067 in) wide, the lower lip joined for 1.5–2.5 mm (0.059–0.098 in) long with lobes 0.4–0.8 mm (0.016–0.031 in) long. Flowering occurs from August to November, and the fruit is a nut 1.8–2.8 mm (0.071–0.110 in) long and 1.6–1.9 mm (0.063–0.075 in) wide and orange-brown, with velvety hairs.

== Taxonomy ==
Conospermum densiflorum was first formally described in 1810 by Robert Brown in Transactions of the Linnean Society of London. The specific epithet (distichum) means 'in two rows', referring to the leaves.

== Distribution and habitat ==
This species of Conospermum grows in sandy soil on dunes, granite outcrops and roadsides, in near-coastal areas between Ravensthorpe and Mount Ragged in Cape Arid National Park in the Avon Wheatbelt, Coolgardie, Esperance Plains and Mallee bioregions of southern Western Australia.

== Conservation status ==
Conospermum distichum is list as "not threatened" by the Government of Western Australia Department of Biodiversity, Conservation and Attractions.
