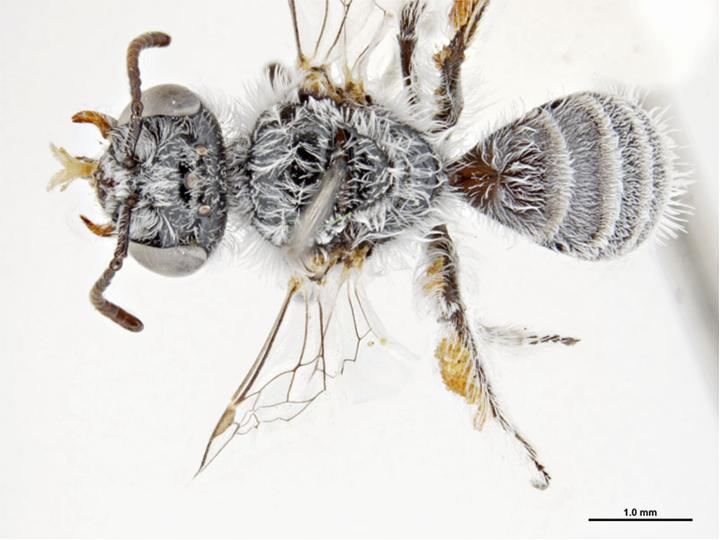
- Female

Scientific classification
- Kingdom: Animalia
- Phylum: Arthropoda
- Clade: Pancrustacea
- Class: Insecta
- Order: Hymenoptera
- Family: Colletidae
- Genus: Leioproctus
- Species: L. tomentosus

Binomial name
- Leioproctus tomentosus Houston, 1989

= Leioproctus tomentosus =

Species of bee

Leioproctus tomentosus, or Leioproctus (Leioproctus) tomentosus, is a species of bee in the family Colletidae and subfamily Colletinae. It is endemic to Australia. It was described by Australian entomologist Terry Houston in 1989.

== Etymology ==
The specific epithet tomentosus (Latin: "densely covered with matted wool or hair") is an anatomical reference.

== Description ==
The male holotype body length is 5.2 mm, female paratype about 6 mm. Integumental colouration is mainly black; the hair is white.

== Distribution and habitat ==
The species occurs in south-west Western Australia on the coastal plain some 140–180 km north of Perth. The type locality is Cataby. It has also been recorded from Badgingarra National Park.

== Behaviour ==
The adults are flying mellivores. Flowering plants visited by the bees include Conospermum crassinervium.

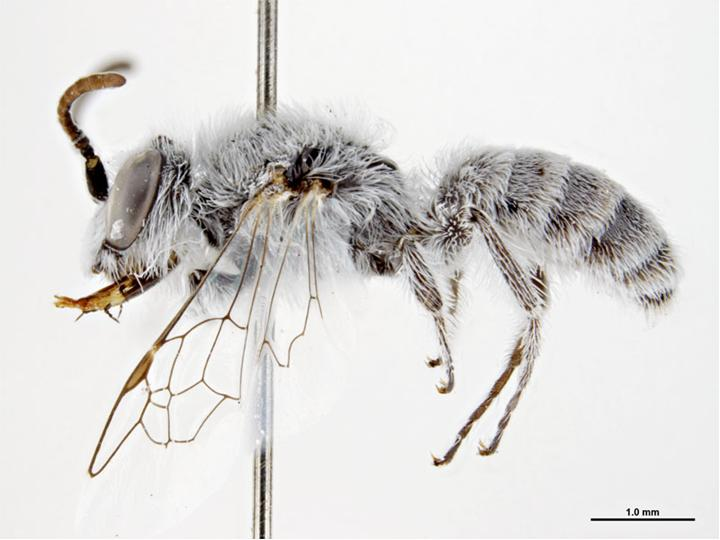
Male

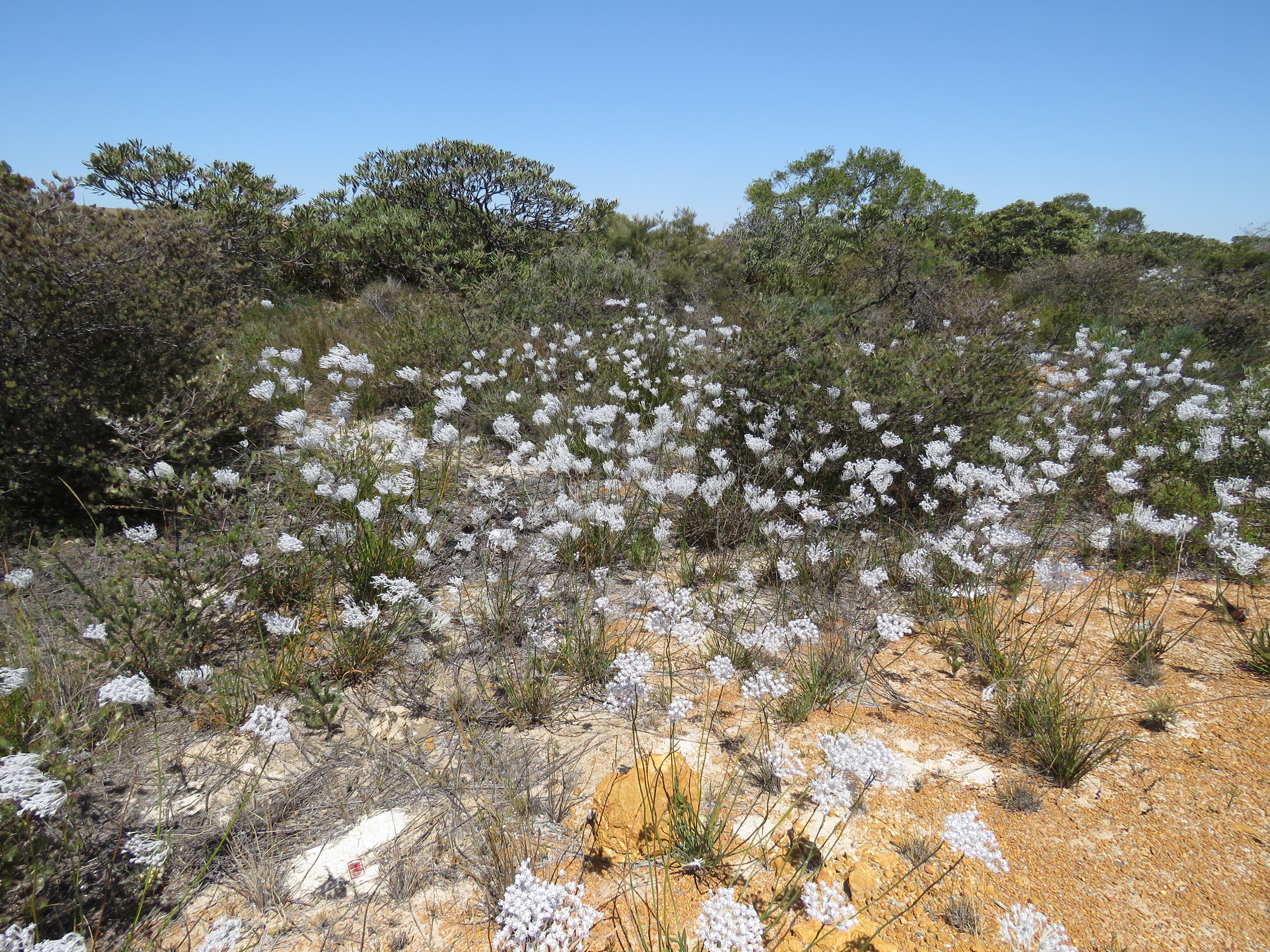
Conospermum crassinervium (summer smokebush), a forage plant of the bees
