= Conospermum quadripetalum =

Conservation status
- Declared rare (DEC)

Scientific classification
- Kingdom: Plantae
- Clade: Tracheophytes
- Clade: Angiosperms
- Clade: Eudicots
- Order: Proteales
- Family: Proteaceae
- Genus: Conospermum
- Species: C. quadripetalum

Binomial name
- Conospermum quadripetalum E.M.Benn.

Species of shrub native to Australia

Conospermum quadripetalum is a species of flowering plant in the family Proteaceae and is endemic to the south of Western Australia. It is a diffuse, straggly shrub with hooked leaves, circular in cross section, and panicles of blue, tube-shaped flowers with white and red hairs.

== Description ==
Conospermum quadripetalum is a spreading, loose shrub that typically grows to a height of up to 30 cm (12 in). Its leaves are 130–350 mm (5.1–13.8 in) long, 0.75–1 mm (0.030–0.039 in) wide and circular in cross section with a hooked tip. The flowers are arranged in panicles, each branch on a peduncle 40–160 mm (1.6–6.3 in) long, with two to six flowers on the end. The bracteoles are greenish-blue, 2.5–3.0 mm (0.098–0.118 in) long and wide and hairy. The flowers are blue or white form a tube 3–4 mm (0.12–0.16 in) long, covered with woolly, white and red hairs. The perianth lobes are more or less equal, 2.0–2.5 mm (0.079–0.098 in) long and 0.75–1 mm (0.030–0.039 in) wide. Flowering occurs in September and November.

== Taxonomy ==
Conospermum quadripetalum was first formally described in 1995 by Eleanor Marion Bennett in the Flora of Australia from specimens she collected near the Scott River Road in 1985. The specific epithet (quadripetalum) means 'four-petalled', referring to the petal lobes that are almost equal.

== Distribution and habitat ==
This species of Conospermum is found on flats behind coastal hills along the south coast in the Jarrah Forest and Warren bioregions of Western Australia, where it grows in sandy-clay soils.

== Conservation status ==
Conospermum quadripetalum is listed as "Threatened Flora (Declared Rare Flora — Extant)" by the Government of Western Australia Department of Biodiversity, Conservation and Attractions.
