= List of Australian Proteaceae =

List of plants that occur in Australia

This is a list of Proteaceae that occur in Australia. It includes all Proteaceae taxa listed as accepted names in the Australian Plant Name Index.

== Acidonia ==
- Acidonia microcarpa

== Adenanthos ==
- Adenanthos acanthophyllus
- Adenanthos apiculatus
- Adenanthos argyreus
- Adenanthos barbiger
- Adenanthos cacomorphus
- Adenanthos cuneatus
- Adenanthos cygnorum
  - Adenanthos cygnorum subsp. chamaephyton
  - Adenanthos cygnorum subsp. cygnorum
- Adenanthos detmoldii
- Adenanthos dobagii
- Adenanthos dobsonii
- Adenanthos drummondii
- Adenanthos ellipticus
- Adenanthos eyrei
- Adenanthos filifolius
- Adenanthos flavidiflorus
- Adenanthos forrestii
- Adenanthos glabrescens
  - Adenanthos glabrescens subsp. exasperatus
  - Adenanthos glabrescens subsp. glabrescens
- Adenanthos gracilipes
- Adenanthos ileticos
- Adenanthos labillardierei
- Adenanthos linearis
- Adenanthos macropodianus
- Adenanthos meisneri
- Adenanthos obovatus
- Adenanthos oreophilus
- Adenanthos pungens
  - Adenanthos pungens subsp. effusus
  - Adenanthos pungens subsp. pungens
- Adenanthos sericeus
  - Adenanthos sericeus subsp. sericeus
  - Adenanthos sericeus subsp. sphalma
- Adenanthos stictus
- Adenanthos terminalis
- Adenanthos velutinus
- Adenanthos venosus

== Agastachys ==
- Agastachys odorata

== Alloxylon P.H.Weston & Crisp ==
- Alloxylon flammeum P.H.Weston & Crisp (type species)
- Alloxylon pinnatum (Maiden & Betche) P.H.Weston & Crisp
- Alloxylon wickhamii (W.Hill & F.Muell.) P.H.Weston & Crisp

== Athertonia ==
- Athertonia diversifolia

== Austromuellera ==
- Austromuellera trinervia
- Austromuellera valida

== Banksia ==
- Banksia aculeata
- Banksia aemula
- Banksia ashbyi
- Banksia attenuata
- Banksia audax
- Banksia baueri
- Banksia baxteri
- Banksia benthamiana
- Banksia blechnifolia
- Banksia brownii
- Banksia burdettii
- Banksia caleyi
- Banksia candolleana
- Banksia canei
- Banksia chamaephyton
- Banksia coccinea
- Banksia conferta
- Banksia cuneata
- Banksia dentata
- Banksia dryandroides
- Banksia elderiana
- Banksia elegans
- Banksia epica
- Banksia ericifolia
- Banksia gardneri
  - Banksia gardneri var. brevidentata
  - Banksia gardneri var. gardneri
  - Banksia gardneri var. hiemalis
- Banksia goodii
- Banksia grandis
- Banksia grossa
- Banksia hookeriana
- Banksia ilicifolia
- Banksia incana
- Banksia integrifolia
- Banksia laevigata
  - Banksia laevigata subsp. fuscolutea
  - Banksia laevigata subsp. laevigata
- Banksia lanata
- Banksia laricina
- Banksia lemanniana
- Banksia leptophylla
  - Banksia leptophylla var. leptophylla
  - Banksia eptophylla var. melletica
- Banksia lindleyana
- Banksia littoralis
- Banksia lullfitzii
- Banksia marginata
- Banksia media
- Banksia meisneri
- Banksia menziesii
- Banksia micrantha
- Banksia nutans
  - Banksia nutans var. cernuella
  - Banksia nutans var. nutans
- Banksia oblongifolia
- Banksia occidentalis
- Banksia oligantha
- Banksia oreophila
- Banksia ornata
- Banksia paludosa
- Banksia petiolaris
- Banksia pilostylis
- Banksia plagiocarpa
- Banksia praemorsa
- Banksia prionotes
- Banksia pulchella
- Banksia quercifolia
- Banksia repens
- Banksia robur
- Banksia saxicola
- Banksia scabrella
- Banksia sceptrum
- Banksia seminuda
- Banksia serrata
- Banksia solandri
- Banksia speciosa
- Banksia sphaerocarpa
- Banksia sphaerocarpa var. caesia
  - Banksia sphaerocarpa var. dolichostyla
  - Banksia sphaerocarpa var. sphaerocarpa
- Banksia spinulosa
  - Banksia spinulosa var. collina
  - Banksia spinulosa var. cunninghamii
  - Banksia spinulosa var. neoanglica
  - Banksia spinulosa var. spinulosa
- Banksia telmatiaea
- Banksia tricuspis
- Banksia verticillata
- Banksia victoriae
- Banksia violacea

== Bellendena ==
- Bellendena montana

== Buckinghamia ==
- Buckinghamia celsissima
- Buckinghamia ferruginiflora

== Cardwellia ==
- Cardwellia sublimis

== Carnarvonia F.Muell. ==
- Carnarvonia araliifolia F.Muell.
  - Carnarvonia araliifolia var. araliifolia
  - Carnarvonia araliifolia var. montana B.Hyland

== Catalepidia P.H.Weston ==
- Catalepidia heyana (F.M.Bailey) P.H.Weston

== Cenarrhenes ==
- Cenarrhenes nitida

== Conospermum ==
- Conospermum acerosum
- Conospermum amoenum
- Conospermum brachyphyllum
- Conospermum bracteosum
- Conospermum brownii
- Conospermum burgessiorum
- Conospermum caeruleum
- Conospermum canaliculatum
- Conospermum capitatum
- Conospermum coerulescens
- Conospermum crassinervium
- Conospermum croniniae
- Conospermum densiflorum
- Conospermum distichum
- Conospermum eatoniae
- Conospermum ellipticum
- Conospermum ephedroides
- Conospermum ericifolium
- Conospermum filifolium
- Conospermum flexuosum
- Conospermum floribundum
- Conospermum glumaceum
- Conospermum huegelii
- Conospermum incurvum
- Conospermum leianthum
- Conospermum longifolium
  - Conospermum longifolium subsp. angustifolium
  - Conospermum longifolium subsp. longifolium
  - Conospermum longifolium subsp. mediale
- Conospermum mitchellii
- Conospermum nervosum
- Conospermum patens
- Conospermum petiolare
- Conospermum polycephalum
- Conospermum scaposum
- Conospermum sphacelatum
- Conospermum stoechadis
- Conospermum taxifolium
- Conospermum tenuifolium
- Conospermum teretifolium
- Conospermum toddii
- Conospermum triplinervium
- Conospermum undulatum

== Darlingia ==
- Darlingia darlingiana
- Darlingia ferruginea

== Dryandra ==
- Dryandra arborea
- Dryandra arctotidis
- Dryandra armata
- Dryandra baxteri
- Dryandra bipinnatifida
- Dryandra blechnifolia
- Dryandra brownii
- Dryandra calophylla
- Dryandra carlinoides
- Dryandra cirsioides
- Dryandra comosa
- Dryandra concinna
- Dryandra conferta
- Dryandra cuneata
- Dryandra cynaroides
- Dryandra drummondii
- Dryandra erythrocephala
- Dryandra falcata
- Dryandra ferruginea
- Dryandra foliolata
- Dryandra foliosissima
- Dryandra formosa
- Dryandra fraseri
- Dryandra hewardiana
- Dryandra horrida
- Dryandra kippistiana
- Dryandra lindleyana
- Dryandra longifolia
- Dryandra mimica
- Dryandra mucronulata
- Dryandra nana
- Dryandra nervosa
- Dryandra nivea
- Dryandra nobilis
- Dryandra obtusa
- Dryandra plumosa
  - Dryandra polycephala
- Dryandra praemorsa
  - Dryandra praemorsa var. praemorsa
- Dryandra preissii
- Dryandra proteoides
- Dryandra pteridifolia
- Dryandra pulchella
- Dryandra purdieana
- Dryandra quercifolia
- Dryandra sclerophylla
- Dryandra seneciifolia
- Dryandra serra
- Dryandra serratuloides
- Dryandra sessilis
- Dryandra shanklandiorum
- Dryandra shuttleworthiana
- Dryandra speciosa
- Dryandra squarrosa
- Dryandra stenoprion
- Dryandra stuposa
- Dryandra subpinnatifida
- Dryandra subulata
- Dryandra tenuifolia
  - Dryandra tenuifolia var. tenuifolia
- Dryandra tortifolia
- Dryandra tridentata
- Dryandra vestita

== Eidothea A.W.Douglas & B.Hyland ==
- Eidothea hardeniana P.H.Weston & Kooyman
- Eidothea zoexylocarya A.W.Douglas & B.Hyland

== Floydia ==
- Floydia praealta

== Franklandia ==
- Franklandia fucifolia
- Franklandia triaristata

== Gevuina ==
- Gevuina bleasdalei

== Grevillea ==
- Grevillea acacioides
- Grevillea acanthifolia
  - Grevillea acanthifolia subsp. acanthifolia
  - Grevillea acanthifolia subsp. paludosa
  - Grevillea acanthifolia subsp. stenomera
- Grevillea acerata
- Grevillea acrobotrya
- Grevillea acuaria
- Grevillea adenotricha
- Grevillea agrifolia
- Grevillea albiflora
- Grevillea alpina
- Grevillea alpivaga
- Grevillea amplexans
- Grevillea anethifolia
- Grevillea aneura
- Grevillea angulata
- Grevillea annulifera
- Grevillea aquifolium
- Grevillea arenaria
  - Grevillea arenaria subsp. arenaria
- Grevillea argyrophylla
- Grevillea armigera
- Grevillea asparagoides
- Grevillea aspera
- Grevillea aspleniifolia
- Grevillea asteriscosa
- Grevillea australis
- Grevillea baileyana
- Grevillea banksii
- Grevillea barklyana
- Grevillea batrachioides
- Grevillea baueri
  - Grevillea baueri subsp. asperula
  - Grevillea baueri subsp. baueri
- Grevillea baxteri
- Grevillea beadleana
- Grevillea beardiana
- Grevillea bedggoodiana
- Grevillea benthamiana
- Grevillea berryana
- Grevillea biformis
- Grevillea bipinnatifida
- Grevillea biternata
- Grevillea brachystachya
- Grevillea brachystylis
- Grevillea bracteosa
- Grevillea brevifolia
- Grevillea buxifolia
  - Grevillea buxifolia subsp. buxifolia
- Grevillea byrnesii
- Grevillea cagiana
- Grevillea calcicola
- Grevillea caleyi
- Grevillea candelabroides
- Grevillea candicans
- Grevillea candolleana
- Grevillea capitellata
- Grevillea ceratocarpa
- Grevillea christineae
- Grevillea chrysophaea
- Grevillea cirsiifolia
- Grevillea coccinea
- Grevillea commutata
- Grevillea concinna
  - Grevillea concinna subsp. concinna
  - Grevillea concinna subsp. lemanniana
- Grevillea confertifolia
- Grevillea coriacea
- Grevillea costata
- Grevillea crassifolia
- Grevillea crithmifolia
- Grevillea cunninghamii
- Grevillea curviloba
- Grevillea cyranostigma
- Grevillea decipiens
- Grevillea decora
- Grevillea decurrens
- Grevillea deflexa
- Grevillea depauperata
- Grevillea didymobotrya
  - Grevillea didymobotrya subsp. didymobotrya
  - Grevillea didymobotrya subsp. involuta
- Grevillea dielsiana
- Grevillea diffusa
  - Grevillea diffusa subsp. diffusa
  - Grevillea diffusa subsp. filipendula
- Grevillea dimidiata
- Grevillea diminuta
- Grevillea dimorpha
- Grevillea disjuncta
- Grevillea divaricata
- Grevillea diversifolia
  - Grevillea diversifolia subsp. diversifolia
  - Grevillea diversifolia subsp. subtersericata
- Grevillea donaldiana
- Grevillea drummondii
- Grevillea dryandri
  - Grevillea dryandri subsp. dasycarpa
  - Grevillea dryandri subsp. dryandri
- Grevillea dryandroides
- Grevillea dryophylla
- Grevillea endlicheriana
- Grevillea erectiloba
- Grevillea erinacea
- Grevillea eriobotrya
- Grevillea eriostachya
- Grevillea eryngioides
- Grevillea erythroclada
- Grevillea evansiana
- Grevillea excelsior
- Grevillea extorris
- Grevillea fasciculata
- Grevillea fistulosa
- Grevillea flexuosa
- Grevillea floribunda
- Grevillea floripendula
- Grevillea formosa
- Grevillea fulgens
- Grevillea georgeana
- Grevillea glauca*
- Grevillea globosa
- Grevillea glossadenia
- Grevillea goodii
- Grevillea gordoniana
- Grevillea granulosa
- Grevillea hakeoides
  - Grevillea hakeoides subsp. hakeoides
  - Grevillea hakeoides subsp. stenophylla
- Grevillea halmaturina
- Grevillea haplantha
- Grevillea heliosperma
- Grevillea helmsiae
- Grevillea hilliana
- Grevillea hookeriana
- Grevillea huegelii
- Grevillea iaspicula
- Grevillea ilicifolia
- Grevillea inconspicua
- Grevillea incrassata
- Grevillea infecunda
- Grevillea infundibularis
- Grevillea insignis
- Grevillea integrifolia
- Grevillea intricata
- Grevillea involucrata
- Grevillea jephcottii
- Grevillea johnsonii
- Grevillea juncifolia
- Grevillea juniperina
- Grevillea kenneallyi
- Grevillea kennedyana
- Grevillea lanigera
- Grevillea latifolia
- Grevillea laurifolia
- Grevillea lavandulacea
- Grevillea leiophylla
- Grevillea leptobotrys
- Grevillea leptopoda
- Grevillea leucoclada
- Grevillea leucopteris
- Grevillea linearifolia
- Grevillea linsmithii
- Grevillea lissopleura
- Grevillea longicuspis
- Grevillea longifolia
- Grevillea longistyla
- Grevillea lullfitzii
- Grevillea makinsonii
- Grevillea manglesii
- Grevillea manglesioides
  - Grevillea manglesioides subsp. manglesioides
- Grevillea maxwellii
- Grevillea micrantha
- Grevillea microstegia
- Grevillea mimosoides
- Grevillea miniata
- Grevillea minutiflora
- Grevillea miqueliana
- Grevillea molyneuxii
- Grevillea montana
- Grevillea monticola
- Grevillea montis-cole
  - Grevillea montis-cole subsp. brevistyla
  - Grevillea montis-cole subsp. montis-cole
- Grevillea mucronulata
- Grevillea muelleri
- Grevillea murex** Grevillea muricata
- Grevillea myosodes
- Grevillea nana
  - Grevillea nana subsp. abbreviata
  - Grevillea nana subsp. nana
- Grevillea nematophylla
- Grevillea neurophylla
- Grevillea newbeyi
- Grevillea nudiflora
- Grevillea obliquistigma
- Grevillea obtecta
- Grevillea obtusiflora
  - Grevillea obtusiflora subsp. obtusiflora
- Grevillea obtusifolia
- Grevillea occidentalis
- Grevillea oldei
- Grevillea oleoides
- Grevillea oligantha
- Grevillea olivacea
- Grevillea oncogyne
- Grevillea paniculata
- Grevillea paradoxa
- Grevillea parallela
- Grevillea parallelinervis
- Grevillea parviflora
- Grevillea patentiloba
- Grevillea patulifolia
- Grevillea pauciflora
  - Grevillea pauciflora subsp. pauciflora
  - Grevillea pauciflora subsp. psilophylla
  - Grevillea pauciflora subsp. saxatilis
- Grevillea pectinata
- Grevillea petrophiloides
  - Grevillea petrophiloides subsp. magnifica
  - Grevillea petrophiloides subsp. petrophiloides
- Grevillea phanerophlebia
- Grevillea phillipsiana
- Grevillea phylicoides
- Grevillea pilosa
  - Grevillea pilosa subsp. pilosa
- Grevillea pilulifera
- Grevillea pimeleoides
- Grevillea pinaster
- Grevillea pinifolia
- Grevillea pityophylla
- Grevillea plurijuga
- Grevillea polyacida
- Grevillea polybotrya
- Grevillea polybractea
- Grevillea prasina
- Grevillea preissii
- Grevillea prostrata
- Grevillea psilantha
- Grevillea pteridifolia
- Grevillea pterosperma
- Grevillea pulchella
- Grevillea pungens
- Grevillea pyramidalis
- Grevillea quercifolia
- Grevillea quinquenervis
- Grevillea ramosissima
- Grevillea refracta
- Grevillea renwickiana
- Grevillea repens
- Grevillea ripicola
- Grevillea rivularis
- Grevillea robusta
- Grevillea rogersoniana
- Grevillea rosieri
- Grevillea rosmarinifolia
- Grevillea roycei
- Grevillea rubicunda
- Grevillea rudis
- Grevillea saccata
- Grevillea sarissa
  - Grevillea sarissa subsp. anfractifolia
  - Grevillea sarissa subsp. bicolor
  - Grevillea sarissa subsp. rectitepala
  - Grevillea sarissa subsp. sarissa
  - Grevillea sarissa subsp. succincta
  - Grevillea sarissa subsp. umbellifera
- Grevillea scabra
- Grevillea scabrida
- Grevillea scapigera
- Grevillea scortechinii
  - Grevillea scortechinii subsp. sarmentosa
  - Grevillea scortechinii subsp. scortechinii
- Grevillea secunda
- Grevillea sericea
- Grevillea sessilis
- Grevillea shiressii
- Grevillea shuttleworthiana
- Grevillea singuliflora
- Grevillea sparsiflora
- Grevillea speciosa
- Grevillea sphacelata
- Grevillea spinosa
- Grevillea spinosissima
- Grevillea steiglitziana
- Grevillea stenobotrya
- Grevillea stenomera
- Grevillea stenostachya
- Grevillea striata
- Grevillea subtiliflora
- Grevillea synapheae
- Grevillea tenuiflora
- Grevillea tenuiloba
- Grevillea teretifolia
- Grevillea tetragonoloba
- Grevillea tetrapleura
- Grevillea thelemanniana
- Grevillea thyrsoides
- Grevillea trachytheca
- Grevillea treueriana
- Grevillea trifida
- Grevillea triloba
- Grevillea tripartita
- Grevillea triternata
- Grevillea umbellulata
- Grevillea uncinulata
- Grevillea variifolia
- Grevillea velutinella
- Grevillea venusta
- Grevillea versicolor
- Grevillea vestita
  - Grevillea vestita subsp. isopogoides
  - Grevillea vestita subsp. vestita
- Grevillea victoriae
- Grevillea whiteana
- Grevillea wickhamii
  - Grevillea wickhamii subsp. aprica
  - Grevillea wickhamii subsp. wickhamii
- Grevillea willisii
- Grevillea wilsonii
- Grevillea wittweri
- Grevillea yorkrakinensis

== Hakea ==
- Hakea aculeata
- Hakea adnata
- Hakea aenigma
- Hakea ambigua
- Hakea amplexicaulis
- Hakea arborescens
- Hakea auriculata
- Hakea bakeriana
- Hakea baxteri
- Hakea brachyptera
- Hakea brownii
- Hakea bucculenta
- Hakea candolleana
- Hakea carinata
- Hakea ceratophylla
- Hakea chordophylla
- Hakea cinerea
- Hakea circumalata
- Hakea clavata
- Hakea collina
- Hakea commutata
- Hakea conchifolia
- Hakea constablei
- Hakea corymbosa
- Hakea costata
- Hakea cristata
- Hakea cucullata
- Hakea cyclocarpa
- Hakea cycloptera
- Hakea cygna
  - Hakea cygna subsp. cygna
  - Hakea cygna subsp. needlei
- Hakea dactyloides
- Hakea decurrens
- Hakea denticulata
- Hakea divaricata
- Hakea drupacea
- Hakea ednieana
- Hakea elliptica
- Hakea epiglottis
- Hakea erecta
- Hakea eriantha
- Hakea erinacea
- Hakea eyreana
- Hakea falcata
  - Hakea falcata var. subuninervis
- Hakea ferruginea
- Hakea flabellifolia
- Hakea florida
  - Hakea florida var. florida
- Hakea florulenta
- Hakea francisiana
- Hakea fraseri
- Hakea gibbosa
- Hakea gilbertii
- Hakea grammatophylla
- Hakea hookeriana
- Hakea ilicifolia
- Hakea incrassata
- Hakea ivoryi
- Hakea laevipes
- Hakea lasiantha
- Hakea lasianthoides
- Hakea lasiocarpha
- Hakea laurina
- Hakea lehmanniana
- Hakea leucoptera
- Hakea linearis
- Hakea lissocarpha
- Hakea lissosperma
- Hakea loranthifolia
- Hakea lorea
- Hakea macraeana
- Hakea macrocarpa
- Hakea marginata
- Hakea megalosperma
- Hakea meisneriana
- Hakea microcarpa
- Hakea minyma
- Hakea mitchellii
- Hakea myrtoides
- Hakea neurophylla
- Hakea nitida
- Hakea nodosa
- Hakea obliqua
- Hakea obtusa
- Hakea oldfieldii
- Hakea oleifolia
- Hakea orthorrhyncha
  - Hakea orthorrhyncha var. filiformis
  - Hakea orthorrhyncha var. orthorrhyncha
- Hakea pachyphylla
- Hakea pandanicarpa
- Hakea pedunculata
- Hakea persiehana
- Hakea petiolaris
- Hakea platysperma
- Hakea plurinervia
- Hakea polyanthema
- Hakea preissii
- Hakea pritzelii
- Hakea propinqua
- Hakea prostrata
- Hakea pulvinifera
- Hakea purpurea
- Hakea pycnoneura
- Hakea recurva
- Hakea repullulans
- Hakea rhombales
- Hakea rostrata
- Hakea rugosa
- Hakea ruscifolia
- Hakea salicifolia
- Hakea scoparia
- Hakea sericea
- Hakea smilacifolia
- Hakea standleyensis
- Hakea stenocarpa
- Hakea stenophylla
- Hakea strumosa
- Hakea subsulcata
- Hakea sulcata
- Hakea tephrosperma
- Hakea teretifolia
- Hakea trifurcata
- Hakea trineura
- Hakea tuberculata
- Hakea ulicina
- Hakea undulata
- Hakea varia
- Hakea verrucosa
- Hakea victoria
- Hakea vittata

== Helicia ==
- Helicia australasica
- Helicia blakei
- Helicia ferruginea
- Helicia glabriflora
- Helicia grayi
- Helicia lamingtoniana
- Helicia lewisensis
- Helicia nortoniana
- Helicia recurva

== Hicksbeachia ==
- Hicksbeachia pilosa
- Hicksbeachia pinnatifolia

== Hollandaea F.Muell. ==
- Hollandaea diabolica A.J.Ford & P.H.Weston
- Hollandaea porphyrocarpa A.J.Ford & P.H.Weston
- Hollandaea riparia B.Hyland
- Hollandaea sayeriana (F.Muell.) L.S.Sm. (type species)

== Isopogon ==
- Isopogon adenanthoides
- Isopogon alcicornis
- Isopogon anemonifolius
- Isopogon anethifolius
- Isopogon asper
- Isopogon attenuatus
- Isopogon axillaris
- Isopogon baxteri
- Isopogon buxifolius
  - Isopogon buxifolius var. buxifolius
  - Isopogon buxifolius var. linearis
  - Isopogon buxifolius var. obovatus
  - Isopogon buxifolius var. spathulatis
- Isopogon ceratophyllus
- Isopogon crithmifolius
- Isopogon cuneatus
- Isopogon dawsonii
- Isopogon divergens
- Isopogon drummondii
- Isopogon dubius
- Isopogon fletcheri
- Isopogon formosus
- Isopogon linearis
- Isopogon longifolius
- Isopogon mnoraifolius
- Isopogon petiolaris
- Isopogon polycephalus
- Isopogon prostratus
- Isopogon scabriusculus
- Isopogon sphaerocephalus
- Isopogon teretifolius
- Isopogon tridens
- Isopogon trilobus
- Isopogon uncinatus
- Isopogon villosus

== Lasjia P.H.Weston & A.R.Mast ==
- Lasjia claudiensis (C.L.Gross & B.Hyland) P.H.Weston & A.R.Mast
- Lasjia grandis (C.L.Gross & B.Hyland) P.H.Weston & A.R.Mast
- Lasjia whelanii (F.M.Bailey) P.H.Weston & A.R.Mast

== Lambertia ==
- Lambertia echinata
- Lambertia ericifolia
- Lambertia fairallii
- Lambertia formosa
- Lambertia ilicifolia
- Lambertia inermis
- Lambertia multiflora
- Lambertia orbifolia
- Lambertia rariflora
- Lambertia uniflora

== Lomatia ==
- Lomatia arborescens
- Lomatia fraseri
- Lomatia fraxinifolia
- Lomatia ilicifolia
- Lomatia myricoides
- Lomatia polymorpha
- Lomatia silaifolia
- Lomatia tasmanica
- Lomatia tinctoria

== Macadamia F.Muell. ==
- Macadamia integrifolia Maiden & Betche
- Macadamia jansenii C.L.Gross & P.H.Weston
- Macadamia ternifolia F.Muell.
- Macadamia tetraphylla L.A.S.Johnson

== Megahertzia A.S.George & B.Hyland ==
- Megahertzia amplexicaulis A.S.George & B.Hyland

== Musgravea ==
- Musgravea heterophylla
- Musgravea stenostachya

== Neorites ==
- Neorites kevedianus

== Nothorites P.H.Weston ==
- Nothorites megacarpus (A.S.George & B.Hyland) P.H.Weston & A.R.Mast

== Opisthiolepis ==
- Opisthiolepis heterophylla

== Orites ==
- Orites acicularis
- Orites diversifolius
- Orites excelsus
- Orites lancifolius
- Orites milliganii
- Orites revolutus

== Persoonia ==
- Persoonia acerosa
- Persoonia acicularis
- Persoonia adenantha
- Persoonia amaliae
- Persoonia angustiflora
- Persoonia arborea
- Persoonia brachystylis
- Persoonia chamaepeuce
- Persoonia chamaepitys
- Persoonia comata
- Persoonia confertiflora
- Persoonia coriacea
- Persoonia cornifolia
- Persoonia curvifolia
- Persoonia daphnoides
- Persoonia dillwynioides
- Persoonia elliptica
- Persoonia falcata
- Persoonia fastigiata
- Persoonia flexifolia
- Persoonia glaucescens
- Persoonia graminea
- Persoonia gunnii
  - Persoonia gunnii var. gunnii
- Persoonia hakeiformis
- Persoonia hirsuta
- Persoonia juniperina
  - Persoonia juniperina var. brevifolia
  - Persoonia juniperina var. juniperina
  - Persoonia juniperina var. ulicina
- Persoonia lanceolata
- Persoonia laurina
- †Persoonia laxa
- Persoonia leucopogon
- Persoonia levis
- Persoonia linearis
- Persoonia longifolia
- Persoonia marginata
- Persoonia media
- Persoonia microphylla
- Persoonia mollis
- Persoonia moscalii
- Persoonia muelleri
  - Persoonia muelleri var. angustifolia
  - Persoonia muelleri var. densifolia
  - Persoonia muelleri var. muelleri
- Persoonia myrtilloides
  - Persoonia myrtilloides subsp. myrtilloides
- Persoonia nutans
- Persoonia oblongata
- Persoonia oxycoccoides
- Persoonia pinifolia
- †Persoonia prostrata
- Persoonia pungens
- Persoonia quinquenervis
- Persoonia recedens
- Persoonia rigida
- Persoonia rudis
- Persoonia rufiflora
- Persoonia saccata
- Persoonia saundersiana
- Persoonia scabra
- Persoonia sericea
- Persoonia silvatica
- Persoonia spathulata
- Persoonia stradbrokensis
- Persoonia striata
- Persoonia subvelutina
- Persoonia sulcata
- Persoonia tenuifolia
- Persoonia teretifolia
- Persoonia trinervis
- Persoonia virgata

== Petrophile ==
- Petrophile acicularis
- Petrophile anceps
- Petrophile axillaris
- Petrophile biloba
- Petrophile biternata
- Petrophile brevifolia
- Petrophile canescens
- Petrophile carduacea
- Petrophile chrysantha
- Petrophile circinata
- Petrophile conifera
- Petrophile crispata
- Petrophile divaricata
- Petrophile diversifolia
- Petrophile drummondii
- Petrophile ericifolia
- Petrophile fastigiata
- Petrophile filifolia
- Petrophile heterophylla
- Petrophile incurvata
- Petrophile juncifolia
- Petrophile linearis
- Petrophile longifolia
- Petrophile macrostachya
- Petrophile media
- Petrophile megalostegia
- Petrophile multisecta
- Petrophile pedunculata
- Petrophile phylicoides
- Petrophile plumosa
- Petrophile pulchella
- Petrophile rigida
- Petrophile scabriuscula
- Petrophile semifurcata
- Petrophile seminuda
- Petrophile serruriae
- Petrophile sessilis
- Petrophile shirleyae
- Petrophile shuttleworthiana
- Petrophile squamata
- Petrophile striata
- Petrophile teretifolia

== Placospermum ==
- Placospermum coriaceum

== Sphalmium ==
- Sphalmium racemosum

== Stenocarpus ==
- Stenocarpus acacioides
- Stenocarpus angustifolius C.T.White
- Stenocarpus cryptocarpus
- Stenocarpus cunninghamii
- Stenocarpus davallioides
- Stenocarpus reticulatus
- Stenocarpus salignus
- Stenocarpus sinuatus
- Stenocarpus verticis Foreman

== Stirlingia ==
- Stirlingia abrotanoides
- Stirlingia anethifolia
- Stirlingia latifolia
- Stirlingia simplex
- Stirlingia tenuifolia

== Strangea ==
- Strangea cynanchicarpa
- Strangea linearis
- Strangea stenocarpoides

== Symphionema ==
- Symphionema montanum
- Symphionema paludosum

== Synaphea ==
- Synaphea acutiloba
- Synaphea decorticans
- Synaphea drummondii
- Synaphea favosa
- Synaphea gracillima
- Synaphea petiolaris
- Synaphea pinnata
- Synaphea polymorpha
- Synaphea preissii
- Synaphea reticulata
- Synaphea spinulosa

== Telopea ==
- Telopea aspera
- Telopea mongaensis
- Telopea oreades
- Telopea speciosissima
- Telopea truncata

== Triunia ==
- Triunia erythrocarpa
- Triunia montana
- Triunia robusta
- Triunia youngiana

== Xylomelum ==
- Xylomelum angustifolium
- Xylomelum cunninghamianum
- Xylomelum occidentale
- Xylomelum pyriforme
- Xylomelum scottianum
