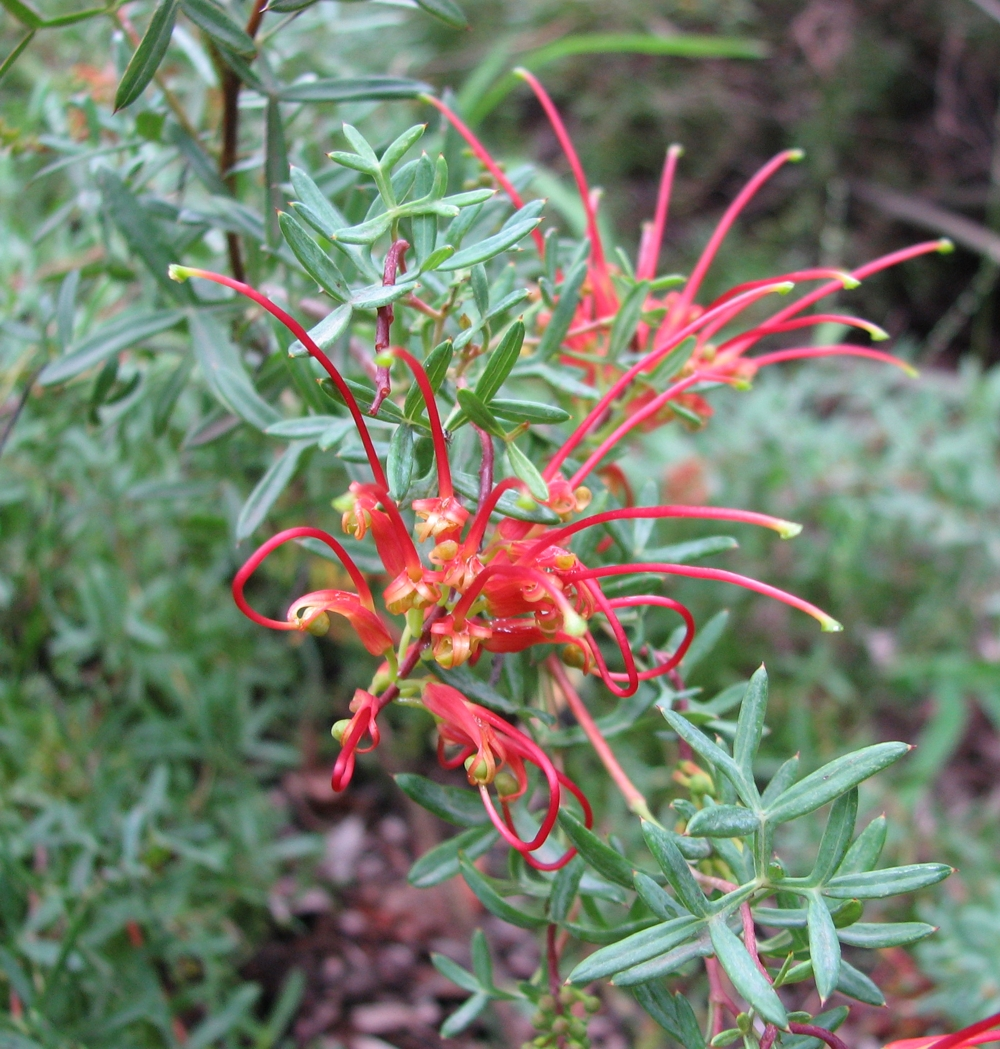
- Grevillea ripicola in Maranoa Gardens

Conservation status
- Priority Four — Rare Taxa (DEC)

Scientific classification
- Kingdom: Plantae
- Clade: Tracheophytes
- Clade: Angiosperms
- Clade: Eudicots
- Order: Proteales
- Family: Proteaceae
- Genus: Grevillea
- Species: G. ripicola

Binomial name
- Grevillea ripicola A.S.George

= Grevillea ripicola =

Collie grevillea

Species of shrub endemic to Western Australia

Grevillea ripicola, commonly known as Collie grevillea, is a species of flowering plant in the family Proteaceae and is endemic to the South West region of Western Australia. It is a dense, spreading shrub with pinnatipartite leaves with rigid, sharply-pointed lobes, and clusters of yellowish-orange flowers, usually with a red style.

== Description ==
Grevillea ripicola is a dense, spreading or sprawling shrub that typically grows to a height of about 2–3 m (6 ft 7 in – 9 ft 10 in) high and has ribbed, more or less glabrous branchlets. The leaves are 26–60 mm (1.0–2.4 in) long in outline and pinnatipartite, with widely spreading, rigid, elliptic to linear, sharply-pointed lobes. The leaf lobes are 10–30 mm (0.39–1.18 in) long and 1.5–5 mm (0.059–0.197 in) wide. The flowers are arranged in clusters of 12 to 20 on a more or less glabrous rachis mostly 13–20 mm (0.51–0.79 in) long, the oldest flowers at the base. The flowers are yellowish-orange, the pistil 29–35 mm (1.1–1.4 in) long and the style usually red. Flowering mainly occurs in October and November and the fruit is an oval follicle 13–17 mm (0.51–0.67 in) long.

== Taxonomy ==
Grevillea ripicola was first formally described in 1974 Alex George in the journal Nuytsia based on plant material he collected at Collie in 1965. The specific epithet (ripicola) means "growing on river banks".

== Distribution and habitat ==
Collie grevillea grows near creeks in Jarrah forest, mainly between Collie, Donnybrook and Bridgetown in the Jarrah Forest bioregion of south-western Western Australia.

== Conservation status ==
Grevillea ripicola is classified as "Priority Four" by the Government of Western Australia Department of Biodiversity, Conservation and Attractions, meaning that it is rare or near threatened.

== Use in horticulture ==
This grevillea is well adapted to cultivation and is frost hardy and fast-growing. Its dense foliage provides habitat for small birds. It is adaptable to most soils and conditions and has been grown on the east coast, south from Sydney.
