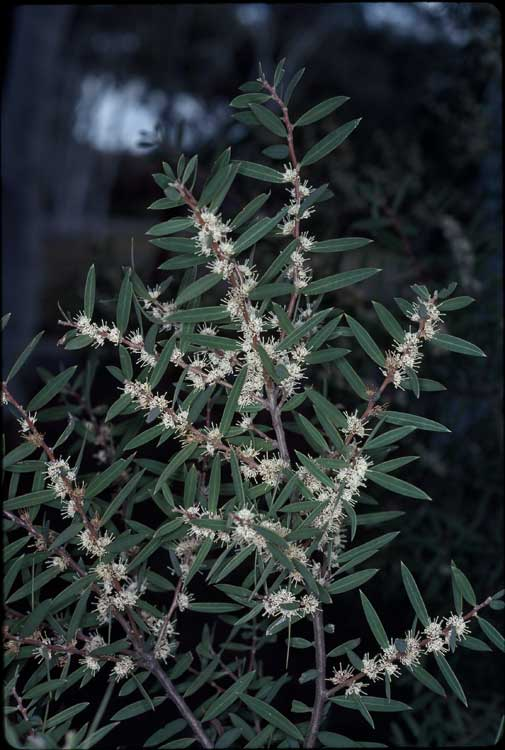
- Hakea marginata in the ANBG

Scientific classification
- Kingdom: Plantae
- Clade: Tracheophytes
- Clade: Angiosperms
- Clade: Eudicots
- Order: Proteales
- Family: Proteaceae
- Genus: Hakea
- Species: H. marginata

Binomial name
- Hakea marginata R.Br.
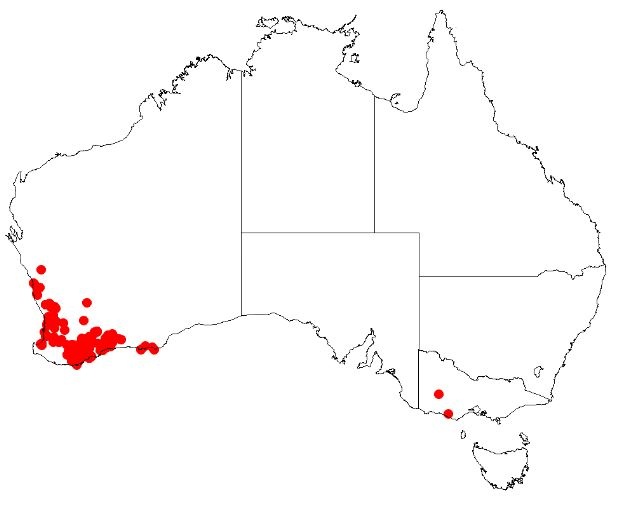
- Occurrence data from AVH

= Hakea marginata =

Species of shrub endemic to Western Australia

Hakea marginata is a shrub in the family Proteaceae. It is endemic to an area in the Mid West, Wheatbelt, Peel, South West, Great Southern and Goldfields–Esperance regions of Western Australia.

== Description ==
Hakea marginata is an erect, rounded to spreading shrub that typically grows to a height of 1 to 5 metres (3 to 16 ft) and does not form a lignotuber. It blooms from August to October and produces sweet scented white or creamy yellow flowers in clusters in leaf axils in upper branchlets. The stiff flat leaves are narrowly elliptic to narrowly obovate 2–5 cm (0.8–2 in) long by 0.4–1 cm (0.2–0.4 in) wide ending in a sharp point. The marginal and central veins are a prominent yellow.

== Taxonomy and naming ==
The species was first formally described in 1810 by Scottish botanist Robert Brown and the description was published in Transactions of the Linnean Society of London. Named from the Latin marginatus 'with a border', referring to the margin surrounding the leaf.

== Distribution and habitat ==
Found widely in Western Australia bounded by Jurien Bay, Kalgoorlie and Cape Arid National Park. Grows in heath or woodland on sand and loans with clay and gravel along road verges, in waterways and creek gullies. This species may grow into impenetrable thickets good for wildlife habitat.

== Conservation status ==
Hakea marginata is classified as "not threatened" by the Western Australian Government.
