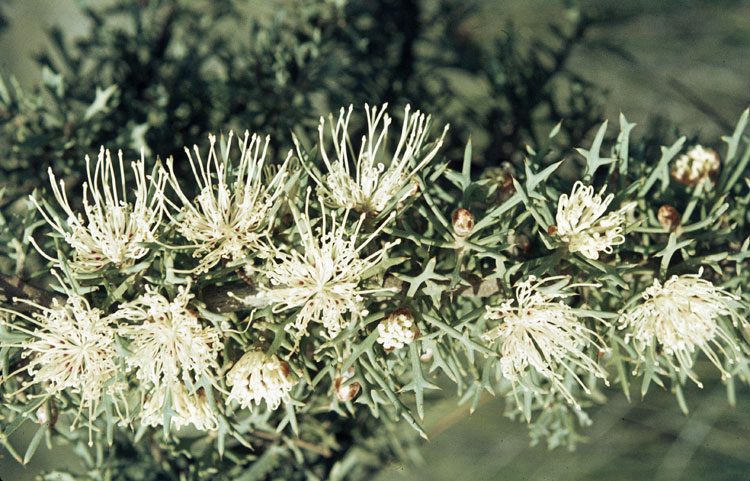

Conservation status
- Priority Three — Poorly Known Taxa (DEC)

Scientific classification
- Kingdom: Plantae
- Clade: Tracheophytes
- Clade: Angiosperms
- Clade: Eudicots
- Order: Proteales
- Family: Proteaceae
- Genus: Hakea
- Species: H. lasiocarpha

Binomial name
- Hakea lasiocarpha R.Br.
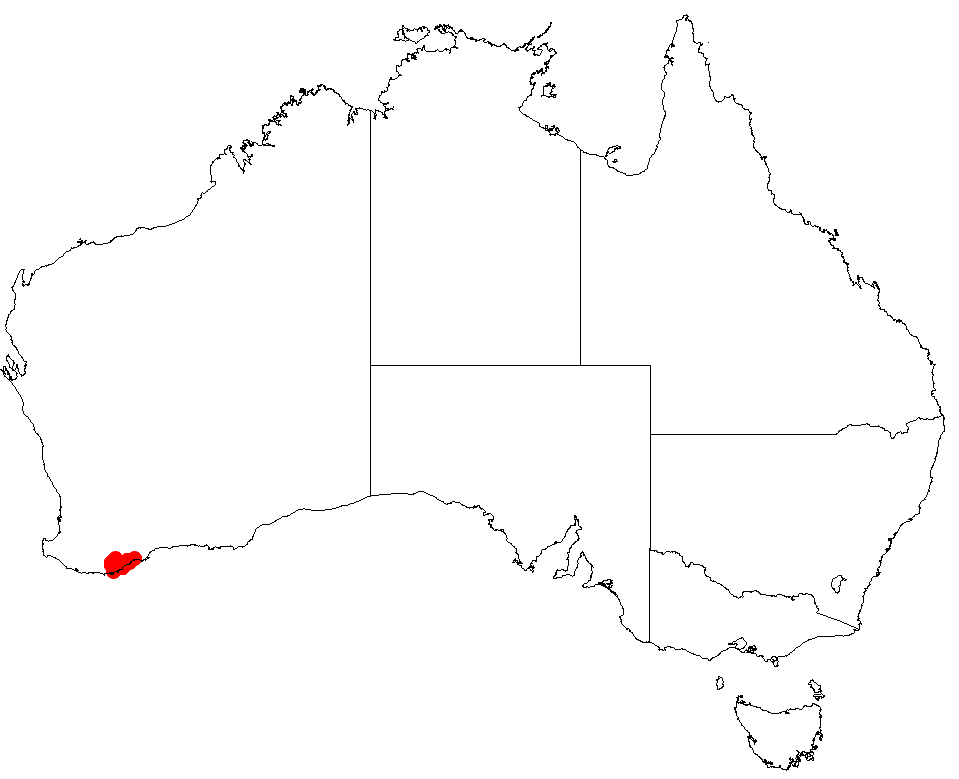
- Occurrence data from AVH

= Hakea lasiocarpha =

Species of shrub endemic to Western Australia

Hakea lasiocarpha, commonly known as long styled hakea, is a shrub in the family Proteaceae and is endemic to Western Australia. It has about 30 whitish flowers in clusters in the upper leaf axils, rigid prickly leaves and a limited distribution.

== Description ==
Hakea lasiocarpha is an upright spreading shrub typically growing to 3 to 6 metres (10 to 20 ft) high and forms a lignotuber. The branchlets are densely covered with long soft hairs. The evergreen rigid leaves are elliptic in cross-section and have a narrowly obovate shape with a length of 1.2 to 4 centimetres (0.47 to 1.57 in) and a width of 1 to 2 millimetres (0.039 to 0.079 in). It blooms from May to July and produces white flowers. Each inflorescence is composed of about 30 flowers. The white perianth is about 8 millimetres (0.315 in) in length. After flowering glabrous fruits form that are covered in small black rounded projections. The fruits have a length of 20 to 23 mm (0.79 to 0.91 in) and about 10 mm (0.39 in) wide with horns that are about 5 mm (0.197 in) long. The seeds inside the fruit have a narrowly ovate or elliptic shape and are 10 to 11 mm (0.39 to 0.43 in) in length with a narrow wing down one side.

== Taxonomy and naming ==
Hakea lasiocarpha was first formally described by the botanist Robert Brown and the description was published in the Supplementum primum prodromi florae Novae Hollandiae. The only known synonym is Hakea dolichostyla. The specific epithet is said to be derived from the Greek words lasios (λάσιος) meaning woolly or hairy or shaggy and carpha meaning small dry body referring to the involucral bracts of the plant.

== Distribution ==
Long styled hakea is endemic to an area along the south coast in the Great Southern region of Western Australia between Albany, Jerramungup and Mount Barker where it is found on hilltops and in valleys growing in sandy-loamy, clay and gravelly soils.
