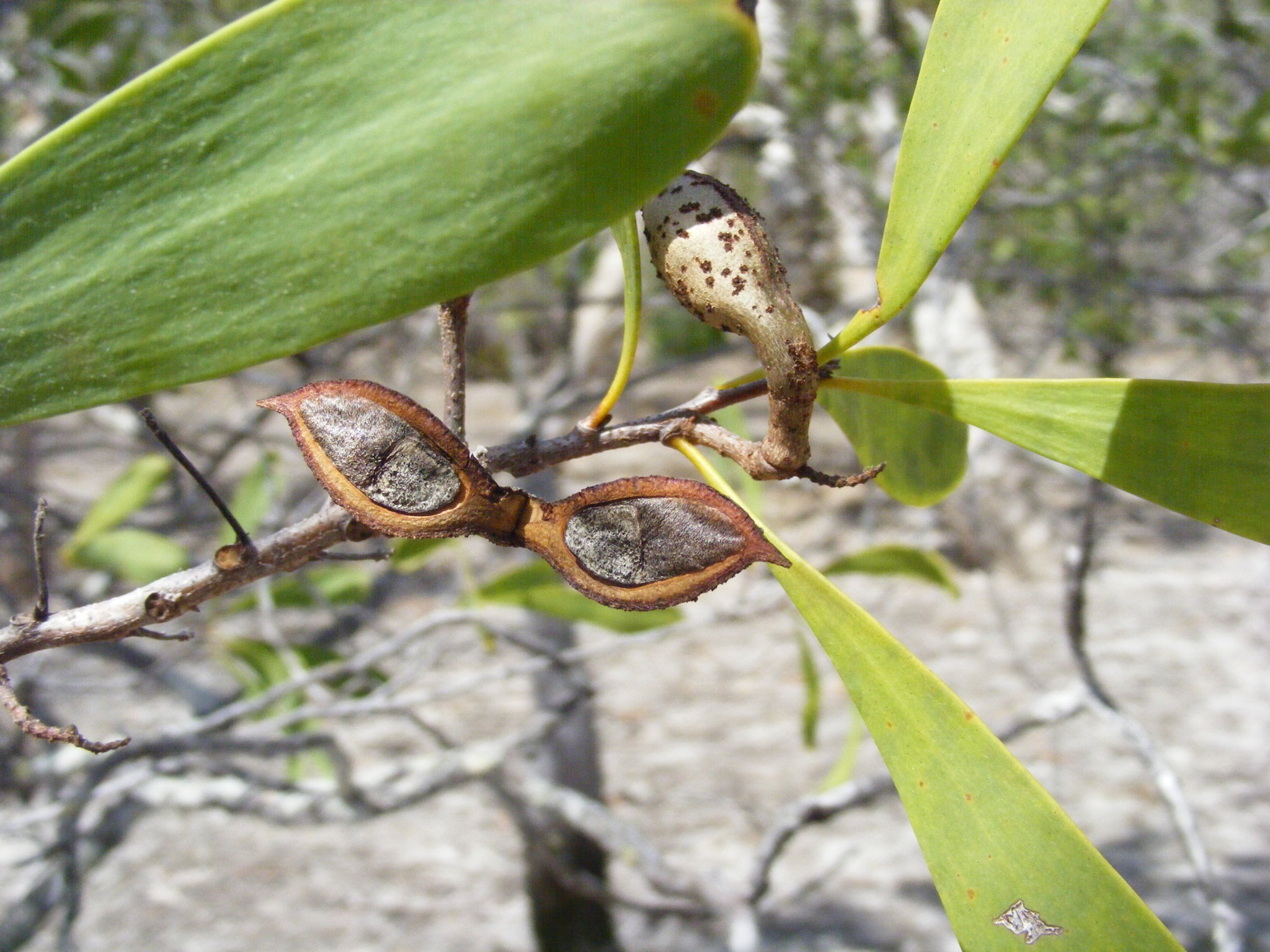

Scientific classification
- Kingdom: Plantae
- Clade: Tracheophytes
- Clade: Angiosperms
- Clade: Eudicots
- Order: Proteales
- Family: Proteaceae
- Genus: Hakea
- Species: H. pedunculata

Binomial name
- Hakea pedunculata F.Muell.
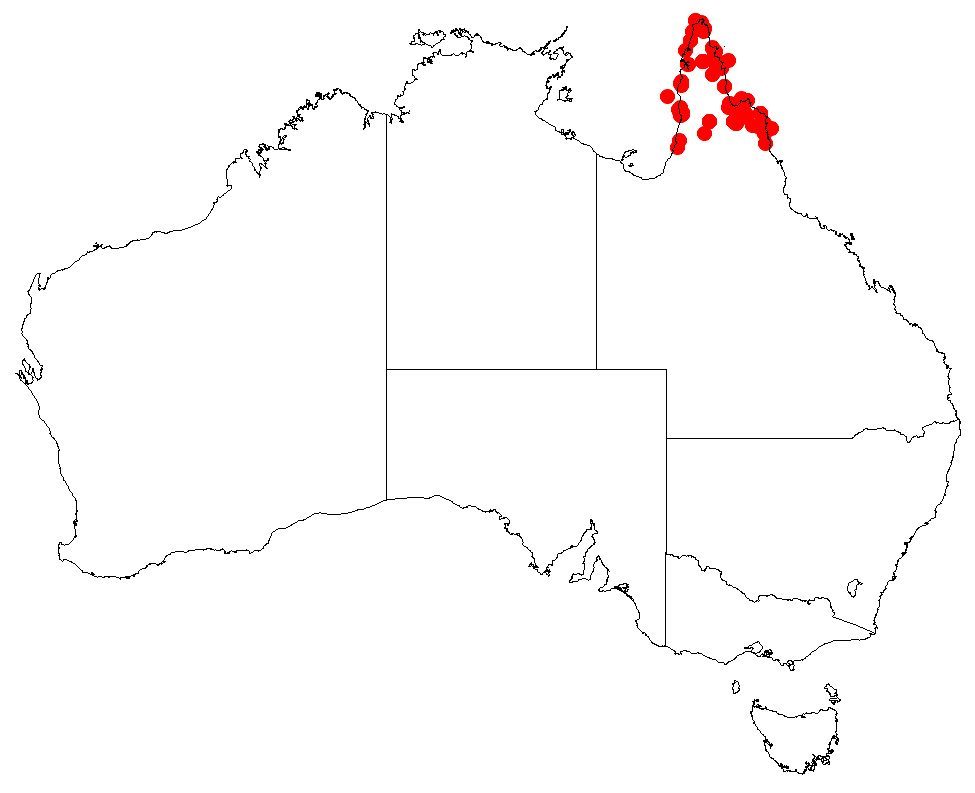
- Occurrence data from Australasian Virtual Herbarium

= Hakea pedunculata =

Species of plant endemic to Queensland, Australia

Hakea pedunculata is a shrub or small tree in the family Proteaceae. This species is found in the Far North region of Queensland and adjacent islands. It has flat, broadly egg-shaped leaves and white, cream or greenish flowers.

== Description ==
Hakea pedunculata is a shrub or small tree, that typically grows to a height of 1 to 5 metres (3 ft 3 in to 16 ft 5 in). It often has knobbly, finely cracked bark, and it branchlets are reddish. The leaves are flat, narrowly to broadly egg-shaped, a rounded apex, 5 to 10 centimetres (2 to 4 in) long and 8 to 20 millimetres (0.31 to 0.79 in) wide, young leaves thickly covered with white, shiny, flattened, hairs that are quickly shed. The inflorescence has up to forty cream-white or greenish white flowers on a peduncle 6.5–25 mm (0.3–1 in) long, each flower on a slightly rough pedicel 2–10 mm (0.08–0.4 in) long that is covered with white soft hairs. Fruit are obliquely egg-shaped tapering at each end or three dimensional and 2 to 3 cm (0.79 to 1.18 in) long and 1 to 1.2 cm (0.39 to 0.47 in) wide, ending in a short backward curving beak about 2–3 mm (0.08–0.1 in) long. Flowering occurs predominantly from April to August and occasionally in February.

== Taxonomy and naming ==
Hakea pedunculata was first formally described in 1883 by Ferdinand von Mueller from a specimen collected by a druggist, W. Anthony Persieh, from a specimen collected near Endeavour River and the description was published in The Australasian Chemist and Druggist. (Hakea persiehana was named in his honour by Mueller in 1886.) The specific epithet (pedunculata) is derived from the Latin word pedunculus meaning "a small, slender stalk", referring to its peduncle, the stalk beneath the inflorescence, which is much longer than in other species of Hakea.

== Distribution and habitat ==
Hakea pedunculata grows north of Cooktown on Cape York Peninsula and on adjacent islands. It is often found in landward edges of mangroves or semi-swamp areas in low shrubland where Melaleuca is dominant.

== Ecology ==
The woodiness of Hakea is determined when the fruit ripens and the two valves open displaying a darker and lighter zone. Most Hakea seed are usually dispersed by an environmental trigger rather than when seed matures, quite often by fire. Whilst other species may require sporadic flooding rains to establish. Those species with a greater pale layer tend to retain their seed longer. Hakea pedunculata is unique in the Pedunculata group for its fruit woodiness and swampy habitat.

== Conservation status ==
Hakea pedunculata is considered "least concern" by the Department of Environment and Science, Queensland.
