= Grevillea calcicola =

Conservation status
- Endangered (IUCN 3.1)

- Priority Three — Poorly Known Taxa (DEC)

Scientific classification
- Kingdom: Plantae
- Clade: Embryophytes
- Clade: Tracheophytes
- Clade: Spermatophytes
- Clade: Angiosperms
- Clade: Eudicots
- Order: Proteales
- Family: Proteaceae
- Genus: Grevillea
- Species: G. calcicola

Binomial name
- Grevillea calcicola A.S.George

Species of plant native to Western Australia

Grevillea calcicola is a species of flowering plant in the family Proteaceae and is endemic to the north-west of Western Australia. It is a much-branched shrub with pinnatisect leaves with linear lobes, and off-white to cream-coloured flowers.

== Description ==
Grevillea calcicola is a much-branched shrub that typically grows to a height of 2 to 4 metres (7 to 13 ft). Its leaves are pinnatisect, 70–200 mm (2.8–7.9 in) long with two to seven linear lobes 1.3–2.5 mm (0.051–0.098 in) wide with the edges rolled under. The flowers are arranged in groups 60–70 mm (2.4–2.8 in) long on the ends of branchlets, and are off-white to creamy-white, the pistil 11.5–12.0 mm (0.45–0.47 in) long. Flowering occurs from May to August and the fruit is a glabrous follicle 21–27 mm (0.83–1.06 in) long.

== Taxonomy ==
Grevillea calcicola was first formally described in 1968 by Alex George in the Journal of the Royal Society of Western Australia from specimens he collected in the Cape Range National Park in 1961. The specific epithet (calcicola) means "limestone-dweller".

== Distribution and habitat ==
This grevillea grows in low mallee shrubland in rocky or stony limestone soils and is restricted to the Cape Range west of Exmouth in north-western Western Australia.

== Conservation status ==
Grevillea calcicola is listed as endangered on the IUCN Red List of Threatened Species. It occurs in fewer than five locations, its extent of occurrence is less than 500 km^{2} (190 sq mi) and its area of occupancy is less than 100 km (62 mi). Major threats include grazing from introduced goats, which degrade habitat and are inferred to be reducing the number of mature individuals and introduced buffel grass, which increases the intensity of fires and decreases the quality of habitat.

It is also listed as priority three by the Government of Western Australia Department of Biodiversity, Conservation and Attractions, meaning that it is poorly known and known from only a few locations but is not under imminent threat.

== See also ==
- List of Grevillea species
