= Grevillea versicolor =

Scientific classification
- Kingdom: Plantae
- Clade: Tracheophytes
- Clade: Angiosperms
- Clade: Eudicots
- Order: Proteales
- Family: Proteaceae
- Genus: Grevillea
- Species: G. versicolor

Binomial name
- Grevillea versicolor McGill.

Species of plant endemic to Australia

Grevillea versicolor is a species of flowering plant in the family Proteaceae and is endemic to a small area of the Northern Territory in Australia. It is a shrub with serrated, fan-shaped leaves, and yellow, white or apricot flowers that turn reddish as they age.

== Description ==
Grevillea versicolor is a shrub that typically grows to a height of 1.5–3 m (4 ft 11 in – 9 ft 10 in). Its leaves are fan-shaped to egg-shaped, 20–120 mm (0.79–4.72 in) long and 25–80 mm (0.98–3.15 in) wide with between 14 and 20, sometimes sharply-pointed teeth on the edges. The flowers are arranged in sometimes branched clusters, each branch with up to 6 flowers on a rachis 2–5 mm (0.079–0.197 in) long. The flowers vary in colour from white through yellow, white or apricot, becoming reddish as they age, the pistil 21–24.5 mm (0.83–0.96 in) long. Flowering occurs from May to November, and the fruit is a more or less glabrous, elliptic follicle 12–19 mm (0.47–0.75 in) long.

== Taxonomy ==
Grevillea versicolorwas first formally described in 1986 by Donald McGillivray in his book, New Names in Grevillea (Proteaceae) from specimens collected by Clyde Dunlop, in the Nabarlek area in 1976. The specific epithet (versicolor) means "variously coloured" or "changing color" referring to the flowers.

== Distribution and habitat ==
The grevillea is only known only from the Nabarlek area of Arnhem Land in the Top End of the Northern Territory, where it grows on sandy soils in open sclerophyll forest on the sandstone escarpment.

== Conservation status ==
Grevillea versicolor is listed as "near threatened" under the Northern Territory Government Territory Parks and Wildlife Conservation Act.
