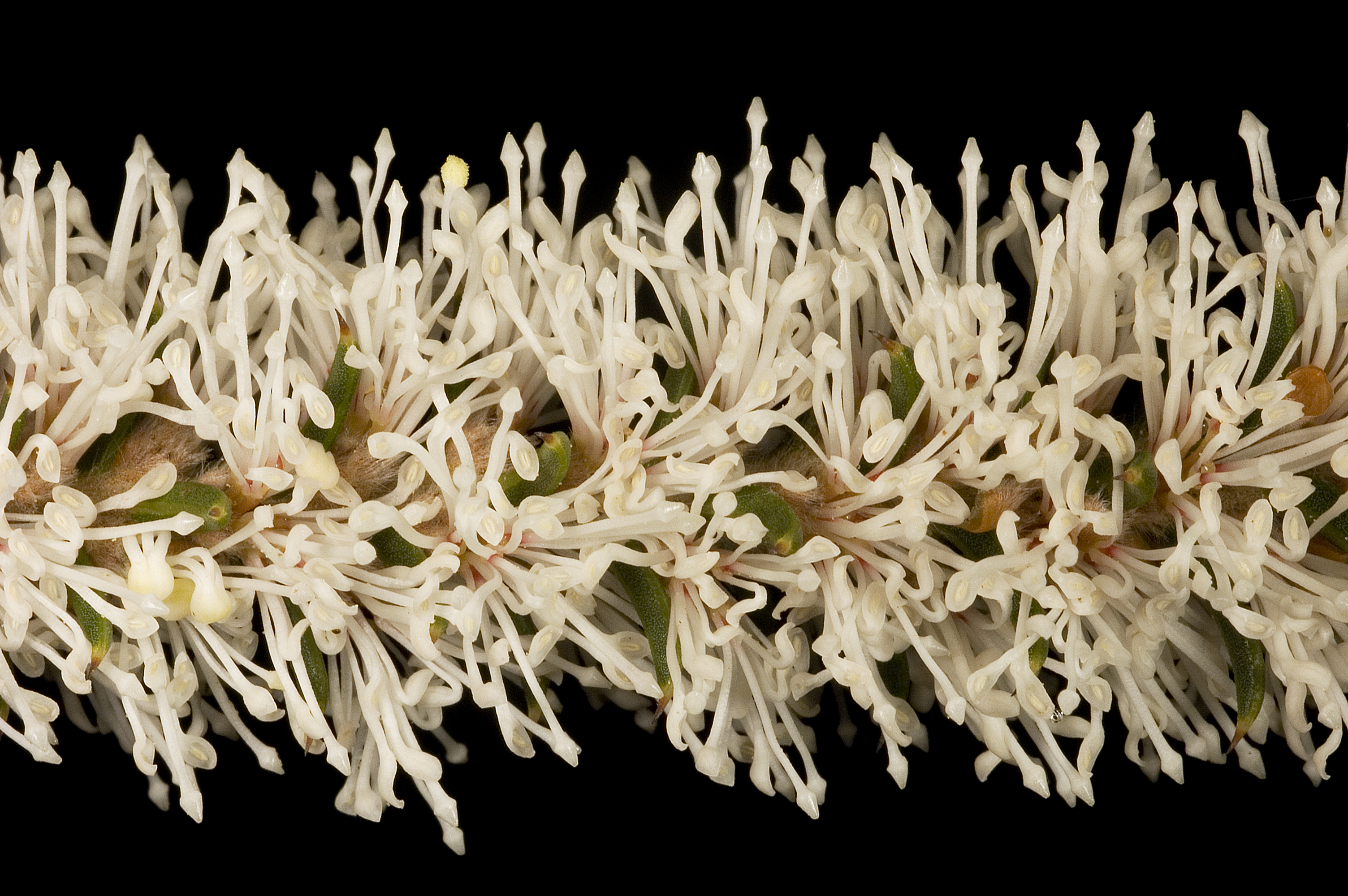
- Hakea costata

Scientific classification
- Kingdom: Plantae
- Clade: Tracheophytes
- Clade: Angiosperms
- Clade: Eudicots
- Order: Proteales
- Family: Proteaceae
- Genus: Hakea
- Species: H. costata

Binomial name
- Hakea costata Meisn.
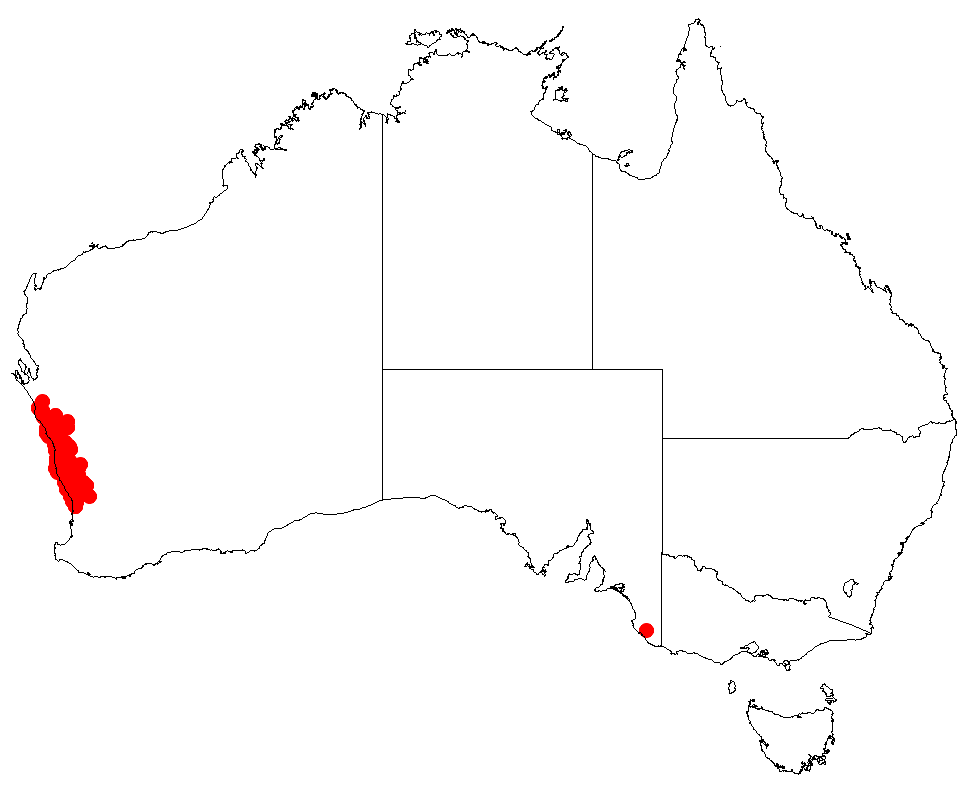
- Occurrence data from AVH

= Hakea costata =

Ribbed hakea

Species of shrub native to Western Australia

Hakea costata, commonly known as the ribbed hakea, is a shrub in the family Proteaceae native to Western Australia. A multi-stemmed small shrub producing attractive pink or white brush-like blooms rich in nectar from July to October.

== Description ==
Hakea costata is an erect non-lignotuberous shrub growing to 0.3 to 2 metres (1.0 to 6.6 ft) high. The smaller branches are densely covered in long soft straight hairs when flowering. Leaves vary depending on where they appear on the shrub. Near the flowers the leaves are mostly linear, rigid and triangular in cross-section 8 to 16 mm (0.315 to 0.630 in) long and 1 to 2.5 mm (0.039 to 0.098 in) wide. The leaves below flowers are flat, narrowly egg-shaped to oval shaped 2 to 5 millimetres (0.079 to 0.197 in) wide. The leaves upper surface have no obvious veins whereas the underside has a prominent mid-vein. The inflorescence has 8–12 strongly scented white or pink flowers in racemes 8–16 cm (3–6 in) long appearing in leaf axils from July to October. The perianth is cream-white, pistil 6 to 9 mm (0.236 to 0.354 in) long. The small fruit are attached to the stem without a stalk, more or less egg-shaped 09–1 cm (3.543–0.394 in) long and 0.6–0.8 mm (0.024–0.031 in) wide slightly curved ending with a short beak. The fruit surface is smooth to slightly warty. The black-brown seeds are more or less elliptic shaped with a wide wing down one side and a narrower wing down the other.

== Taxonomy and naming ==
Hakea costata was first formally described by the botanist Carl Meissner in 1845 and published in Johann Georg Christian Lehmann's book Plantae Preissianae. The specific epithet is derived from the Latin costatus meaning "ribbed", referring to the longitudinal ribbing of the leaves.

== Distribution ==
Ribbed hakea is endemic to an area along the west coast in the Wheatbelt and Mid West regions of Western Australia from about Kalbarri in the north to Yanchep in the south growing in sandy soils over limestone or laterite.
