= Grevillea adenotricha =

Conservation status
- Data Deficient (IUCN 3.1)

- Priority Four — Rare Taxa (DEC)

Scientific classification
- Kingdom: Plantae
- Clade: Embryophytes
- Clade: Tracheophytes
- Clade: Spermatophytes
- Clade: Angiosperms
- Clade: Eudicots
- Order: Proteales
- Family: Proteaceae
- Genus: Grevillea
- Species: G. adenotricha

Binomial name
- Grevillea adenotricha McGill.

Species of shrub endemic to Western Australia

Grevillea adenotricha is a species of flowering plant in the family Proteaceae and is endemic to the north of Western Australia. It is a shrub with narrowly oblong leaves with serrated edges, and red flowers with an orange style.

== Description ==
Grevillea adenotricha is a shrub that typically grows to a height of 0.8–2 m (2 ft 7 in – 6 ft 7 in). Its leaves are narrowly oblong, 30–65 mm (1.2–2.6 in) long and 15–25 mm (0.59–0.98 in) wide with mostly 13 to 25 sharply-pointed teeth on the edges and glandular hairs on both surfaces. The flowers are arranged in groups on the ends of branches or in leaf axils on a flowering stem 1–5 mm (0.039–0.197 in) long, and are red with an orange style. Each flower is on a pedicel 2.0–2.5 mm (0.079–0.098 in) long, and the pistil is 4–6 mm (0.16–0.24 in) long and glabrous. Flowering mainly occurs from May to August and the fruit is an oblong follicle 9.5–11 mm (0.37–0.43 in) long.

== Taxonomy ==
Grevillea adenotricha was first formally described in 1986 by Donald McGillivray in his book New Names in Grevillea (Proteaceae), based on plant material collected from Manning Gorge in 1973. The specific epithet (adenotricha) means "gland-hair".

== Distribution and habitat ==
This grevillea grows on sandstone outcrops and is only known from the Manning Gorge, lushington Brook and Prince Regent River areas of the Kimberley region of northern Western Australia.

== Conservation status ==
Grevillea adenotricha is listed as priority four by the Government of Western Australia Department of Biodiversity, Conservation and Attractions, meaning that is rare or near threatened. It is also listed as data deficient by the International Union for Conservation of Nature due to having very few records and little being known about its threats. Potential threats to the species include inappropriate fire regimes and trampling and grazing from feral cattle, though more information is needed to determine the possible impact of these threats.
