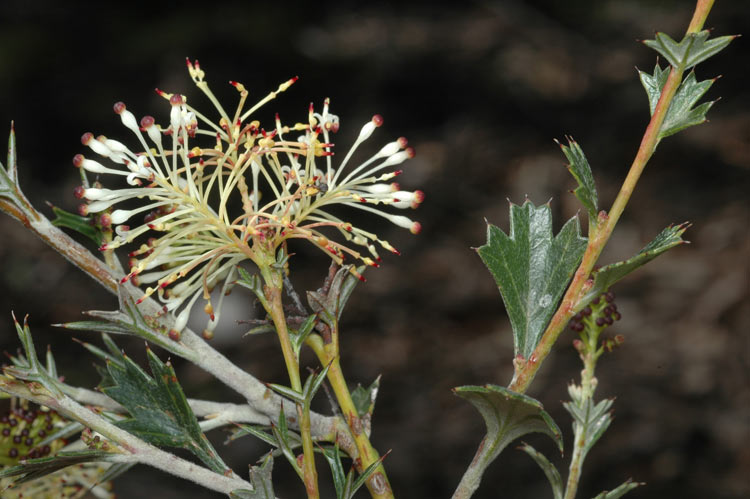
- In the Australian National Botanic Gardens

Conservation status
- Endangered (IUCN 3.1)

Scientific classification
- Kingdom: Plantae
- Clade: Embryophytes
- Clade: Tracheophytes
- Clade: Spermatophytes
- Clade: Angiosperms
- Clade: Eudicots
- Order: Proteales
- Family: Proteaceae
- Genus: Grevillea
- Species: G. acrobotrya

Binomial name
- Grevillea acrobotrya Meisn.

= Grevillea acrobotrya =

Species of shrub endemic to Western Australia

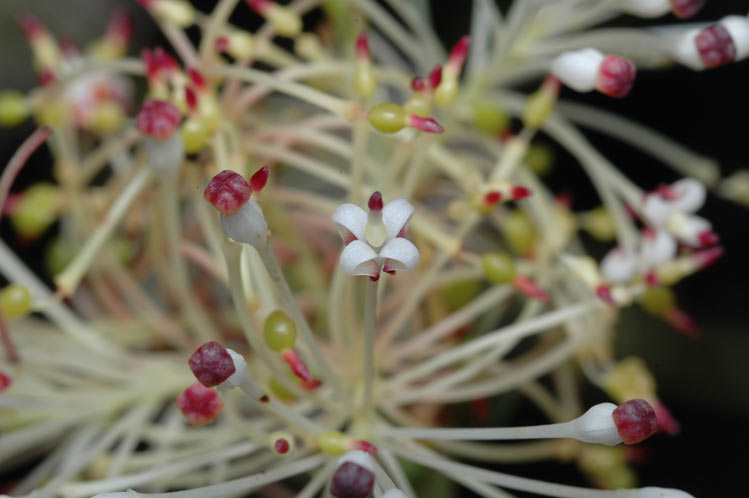
Flower detail

Grevillea acrobotrya is a species of flowering plant in the family Proteaceae and is endemic to the southwest of Western Australia. It is a prickly, spreading to erect shrub with egg-shaped to trowel-shaped leaves with sharply-tipped lobes, and white to cream-coloured flowers with smaller leaves at the base.

== Description ==
Grevillea acrobotrya is a spreading to erect shrub that typically grows to a height of 0.6–2 m (2 ft 0 in – 6 ft 7 in) and has woolly-hairy branchlets, but glabrous flowering branchlets. Its leaves are egg-shaped with the narrower end towards the base, or trowel-shaped, 6–40 mm (0.24–1.57 in) long and 10–35 mm (0.39–1.38 in) wide with five to nine sharply-pointed lobes. The branches bearing flowers have smaller leaves that have three narrowly triangular, sharply pointed lobes and are up to about 7 mm (0.28 in) long. The flowers are arranged in more or less spherical groups on the ends of branches and in leaf axils, each flower on a pedicel 5–7 mm (0.20–0.28 in) long, the perianth white to cream-coloured, the limb chocolate-coloured and the pistil 3–4 mm (0.12–0.16 in) long. Flowering occurs in most months with a peak from June to September and the fruit is a smooth, oblong follicle mostly 8–11 mm (0.31–0.43 in) long.

== Taxonomy ==
Grevillea acrobotrya was first formally described in 1855 by Carl Meissner in Hooker's Journal of Botany and Kew Garden Miscellany based on material collected by James Drummond in the hinterland north of the Swan River. The specific epithet (acrobotrya) means "a bunch of grapes".

== Distribution and habitat ==
This grevillea grows in heathland between Eneabba and Badgingarra in the Geraldton Sandplains and Swan Coastal Plain biogeographic regions of south-western Western Australia.

== Conservation status ==
Grevillea acrobotyra is listed as endangered by the International Union for Conservation of Nature. The species is threatened by continuous and severe land clearing for sand mining, agriculture and road construction.
