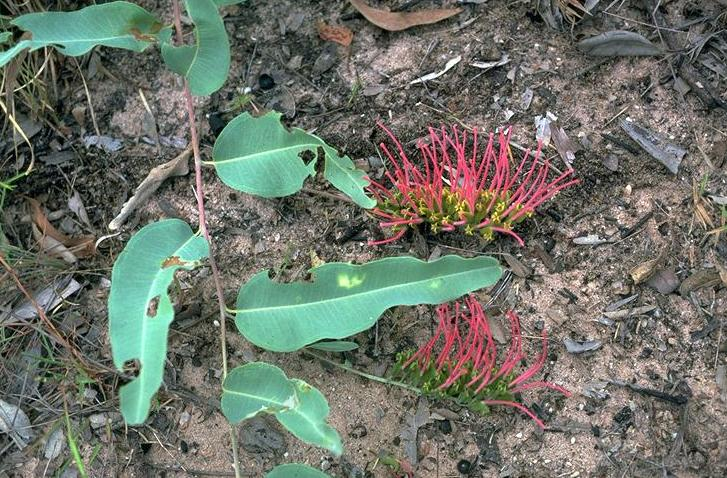
- In Kakadu National Park

Conservation status
- Least Concern (IUCN 3.1)

Scientific classification
- Kingdom: Plantae
- Clade: Embryophytes
- Clade: Tracheophytes
- Clade: Angiosperms
- Clade: Eudicots
- Order: Proteales
- Family: Proteaceae
- Genus: Grevillea
- Species: G. goodii

Binomial name
- Grevillea goodii R.Br.

Synonyms
- Grevillea goodii R.Br. subsp. goodii

= Grevillea goodii =

Species of plant endemic to Australia

Grevillea goodii, also known as Good's grevillea, is a species of flowering plant in the family Proteaceae and is endemic to the Northern Territory. It is a prostrate shrub with egg-shaped to narrowly elliptic leaves and clusters of light green flowers with a pink to red style.

== Description ==
Grevillea goodii is a prostrate shrub with stems trailing from a lignotuber. Its leaves are lance-shaped to egg-shaped or narrowly elliptic, 50–250 mm (2.0–9.8 in) long and 15–50 mm (0.59–1.97 in) wide on a petiole 4–7 mm (0.16–0.28 in) long. The edges of the leaves are wavy and the lower surface is pimply and slightly hairy. The flowers are usually arranged on the ends of branches on a flowering stem longer than the leaves, on a rachis 45–100 mm (1.8–3.9 in) long. The flowers are light green with rust-coloured and pale hairs, the pistil 36–42 mm (1.4–1.7 in) long and the style pink to red. Flowering mainly occurs from November to April and the fruit is a hairy, oblong to more or less spherical follicle about 15 mm (0.59 in) long.

== Taxonomy ==
Grevillea goodii was first formally described in 1810 by Robert Brown in the Transactions of the Linnean Society of London. The specific epithet (goodii) honours Brown's assistant, Peter Good.

== Distribution and habitat ==
Good's grevillea occurs in the tropical Top End of the Northern Territory, from Darwin eastwards to Gunbalanya, and southwards almost as far as Pine Creek. It grows on siliceous sandy or loamy soils in low heath, savanna woodland and open eucalypt forest.

== Conservation status ==
Good's grevillea is listed as least concern on the IUCN Red List of Threatened Species. It is locally common within its distribution and the population is generally stable, with declines in some urban areas. These species does not currently face any major threats, and does not require any additional conservation actions as it is also likely present in multiple protected areas.
