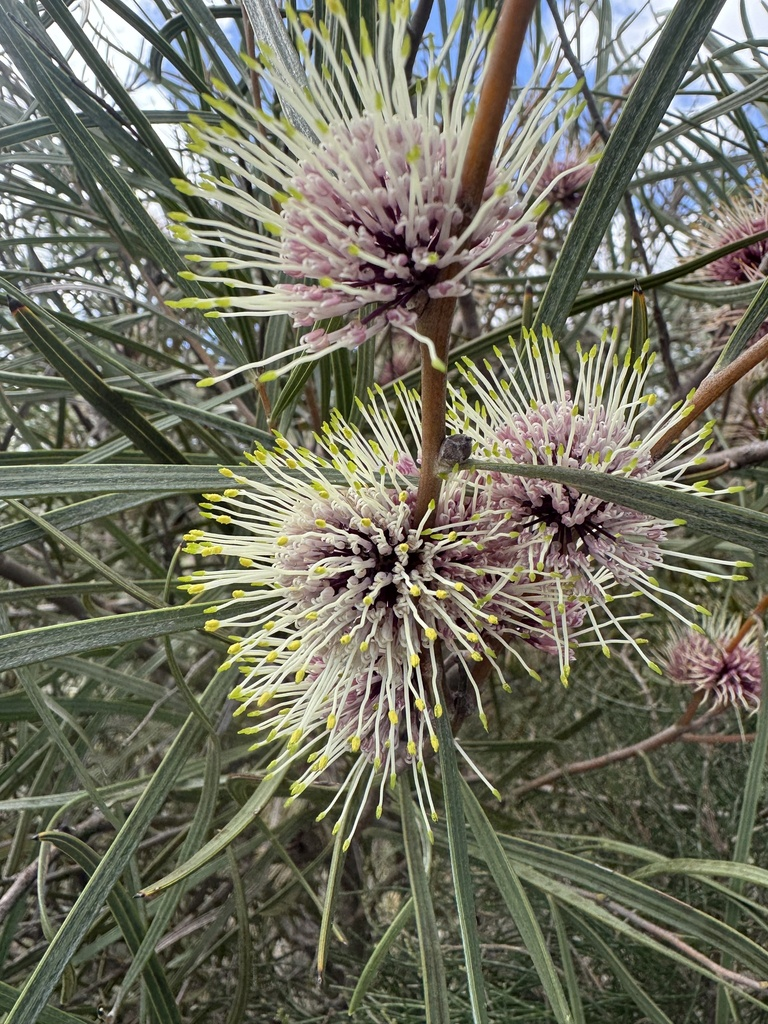

Scientific classification
- Kingdom: Plantae
- Clade: Embryophytes
- Clade: Tracheophytes
- Clade: Angiosperms
- Clade: Eudicots
- Order: Proteales
- Family: Proteaceae
- Genus: Hakea
- Species: H. pycnoneura

Binomial name
- Hakea pycnoneura Meisn.
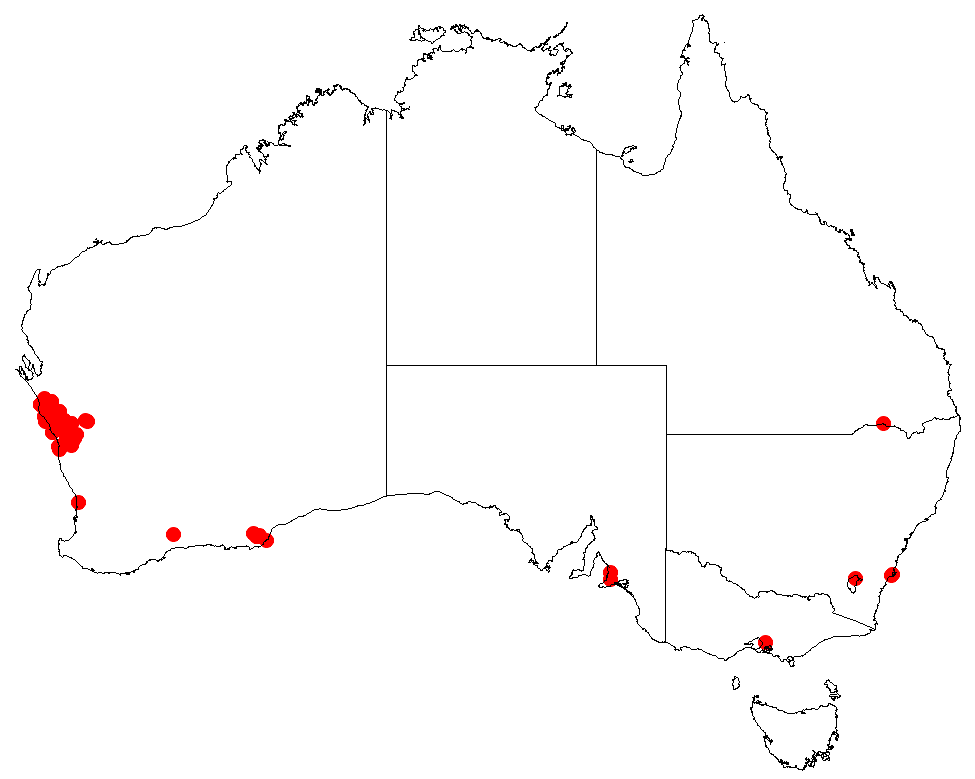
- Occurrence data from Australasian Virtual Herbarium

= Hakea pycnoneura =

Species of shrub endemic to Western Australia

Hakea pycnoneura is a shrub in the family Proteaceae. It has fragrant, pink-purplish flowers in the leaf axils. It is endemic to a small area on the west coast in the Mid West and a smaller area on the south coast in the Goldfields-Esperance regions of Western Australia.

== Description ==
The rounded fairly open shrub has smooth grey bark and typically grows to a height of 2 to 3 metres (7 to 10 ft). It blooms from May to August and produces clusters of cream-pink flowers with a purple base in the leaf axils or on old wood. The flat thick linear leaves are 9–20 cm (4–8 in) long, sometimes curving and ending in sharp point with a prominent midvein. The corky ovoid fruit are 15–25 mm (0.6–1 in) long and 8–12 mm (0.3–0.5 in) wide with small spikes on the surface.

== Taxonomy and naming ==
Hakea pycnoneura was first formally described in 1855 by Carl Meissner and the description was published in William Jackson Hooker's book Journal of Botany and Kew Garden Miscellany from a specimen collected by James Drummond. Named from the Greek pycnos - close and neuron - nerve, referring to the veins in the leaf.

== Distribution and habitat ==
This species grows in heath and shrubland in sand, loam and gravel north of Perth from Kalbarri to near Morawa. Also found in small population on the south coast at Mt Ragged and near Esperance where it grows among quartzite rocks. An ornamental frost-tolerant species requiring a sunny aspect and a well-drained site.

== Conservation status ==
Hakea pycnoneura is classified as "not threatened" by the Western Australian Government Department of Parks and Wildlife.
