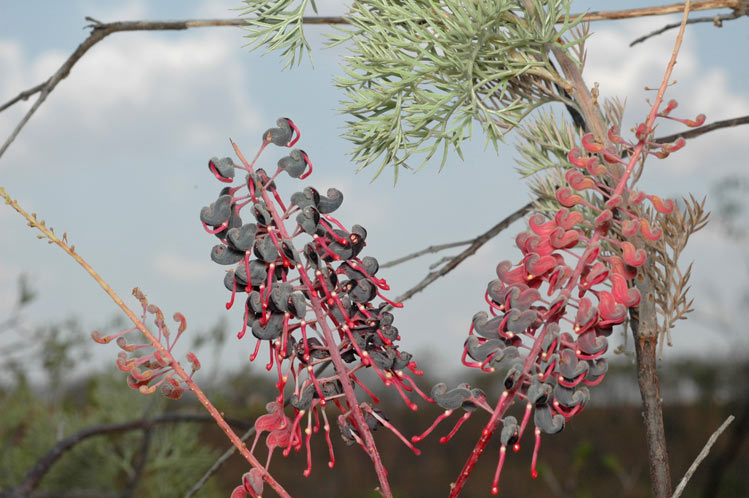

Conservation status
- Vulnerable (IUCN 3.1)

Scientific classification
- Kingdom: Plantae
- Clade: Embryophytes
- Clade: Tracheophytes
- Clade: Spermatophytes
- Clade: Angiosperms
- Clade: Eudicots
- Order: Proteales
- Family: Proteaceae
- Genus: Grevillea
- Species: G. benthamiana

Binomial name
- Grevillea benthamiana McGill.

= Grevillea benthamiana =

Species of shrub endemic to Australia

Grevillea benthamiana is a species of flowering plant in the family Proteaceae and is endemic to the Northern Territory. It is a shrub with bipinnate leaves that have linear lobes, and reddish flowers that turn black.

== Description ==
Grevillea benthamiana is a shrub that typically grows to a height of 2–4 m (6 ft 7 in – 13 ft 1 in). Its leaves are bipinnate, 25–50 mm (0.98–1.97 in) long and 30–45 mm (1.2–1.8 in) wide in outline, and with 14 to 24 lobes that are further divided, the end lobes linear to narrow triangular, 3–10 mm (0.12–0.39 in) long and 0.7–1.0 mm (0.028–0.039 in) wide. The end lobes are rigid and sharply pointed with the edges rolled under. The flowers are arranged in clusters on or near the ends of branchlets, the rachis 80–100 mm (3.1–3.9 in) long, each flower on a pedicel 6.5–7.0 mm (0.26–0.28 in) long. The flowers are pinkish-red to purple-red, turning black as they age, and the pistil is 14.5–15.5 mm (0.57–0.61 in) long. Flowering occurs from June to August and the fruit is a glabrous follicle 16–19 mm (0.63–0.75 in) long.

== Taxonomy ==
Grevillea benthamiana was first formally described in 1986 by Donald McGillivray in his book New Names in Grevillea (Proteaceae), based on specimens he collected in 1978. The specific epithet (benthamiana) honours George Bentham.

== Distribution and habitat ==
This grevillea grows in low, open woodland and is restricted to the plateaus and escarpments of the Daly River basin.

== Conservation status ==
Grevillea benthamiana is listed as near-threatened by the Northern Territory Government and as vulnerable on the IUCN Red List of Threatened Species.
