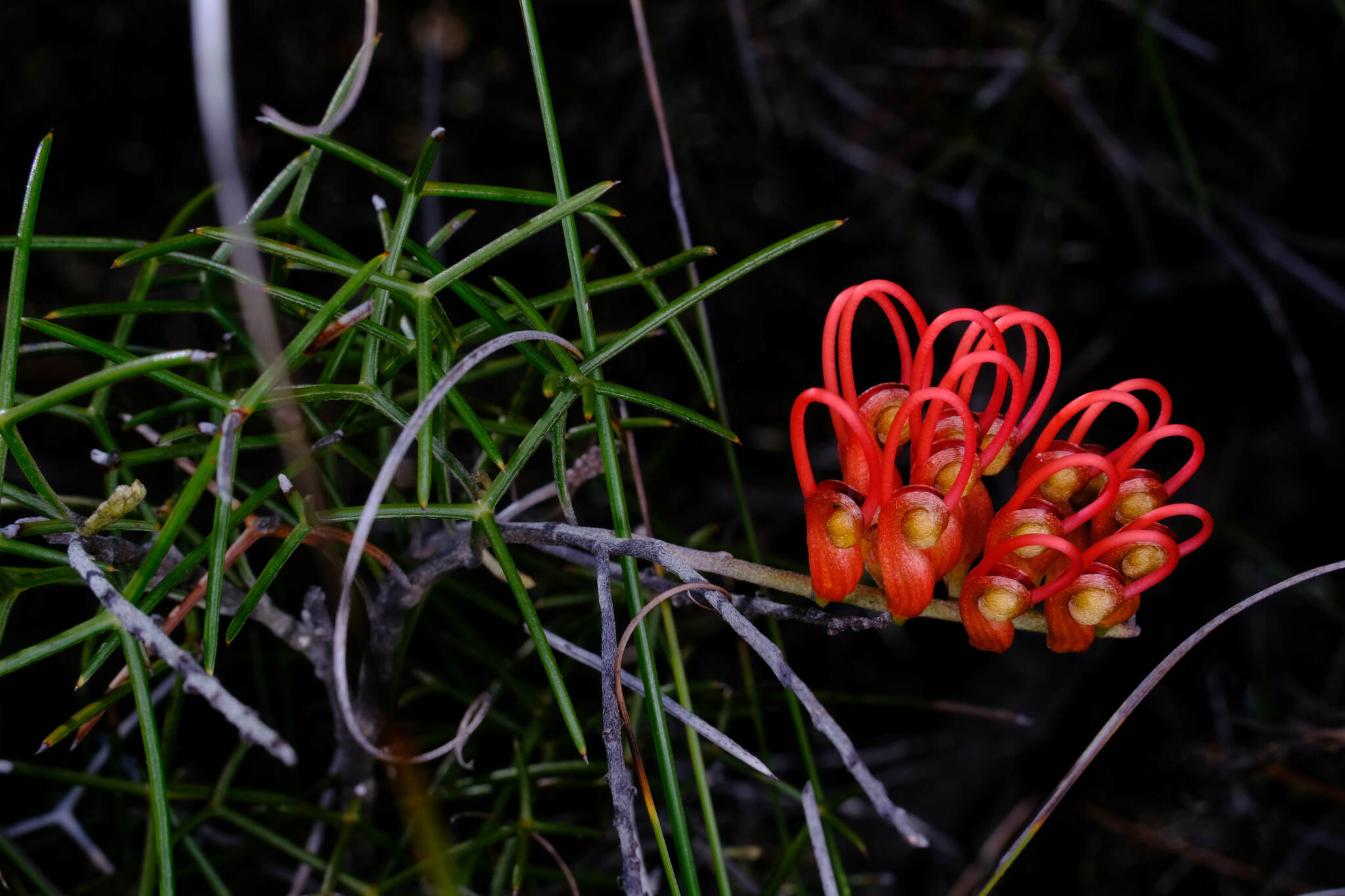

Conservation status
- Least Concern (IUCN 3.1)

- Priority Four — Rare Taxa (DEC)

Scientific classification
- Kingdom: Plantae
- Clade: Embryophytes
- Clade: Tracheophytes
- Clade: Spermatophytes
- Clade: Angiosperms
- Clade: Eudicots
- Order: Proteales
- Family: Proteaceae
- Genus: Grevillea
- Species: G. aneura

Binomial name
- Grevillea aneura McGill.

= Grevillea aneura =

Species of shrub native to Western Australia

Grevillea aneura, commonly known as Red Lake grevillea, is a species of flowering plant in the family Proteaceae and is endemic to Western Australia. It is a dense, prickly shrub with sharply-pointed, deeply divided leaves and light yellow to reddish flowers.

== Description ==
Grevillea aneura is a dense shrub that typically grows to a height of 0.6–2.8 m (2 ft 0 in – 9 ft 2 in). It has sharply-pointed leaves 40–75 mm (1.6–3.0 in) long that are divided to the mid-rib into two or three lobes, the lobes sometimes further divided, the end lobes linear to more or less cylindrical, 5–50 mm (0.20–1.97 in) long and 0.8–1.1 mm (0.031–0.043 in) wide. The flowers are arranged along an erect rachis 35–70 mm (1.4–2.8 in) long, and are light yellow to red or reddish-orange, the pistil 27–28 mm (1.06–1.10 in) long with a light orange to bright red style with a greenish tip. Flowering mostly occurs from August to January and the fruit is a follicle 10–13 mm (0.39–0.51 in) long.

== Taxonomy ==
Grevillea aneura was first formally described in 1986 by Donald McGillivray in his book New Names in Grevillea (Proteaceae). The specific epithet (aneura) means "without nerves", referring to the phyllodes.

== Distribution and habitat ==
Red Lake grevillea grows in heath and mallee scrub between Lake King and south of Salmon Gums in the Esperance Plains and Mallee biogeographic regions of south-western Western Australia.

== Conservation status ==
Grevillea aneura is classified as priority four by the Government of Western Australia Department of Biodiversity, Conservation and Attractions, meaning that is rare or near threatened.

It is also listed as least concern by the International Union for Conservation of Nature. Although it has a limited distribution, it has been observed to be common and has a stable population. There are currently no major threats to the species.
