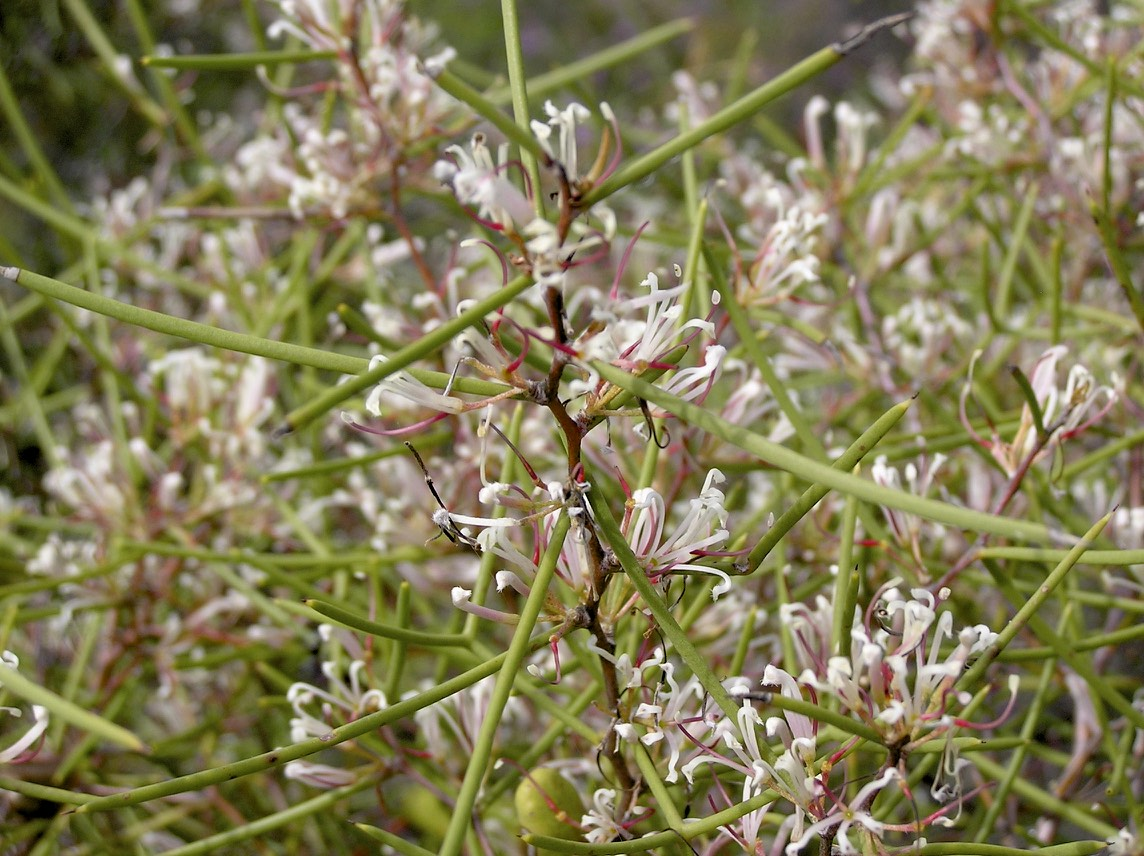

Scientific classification
- Kingdom: Plantae
- Clade: Tracheophytes
- Clade: Angiosperms
- Clade: Eudicots
- Order: Proteales
- Family: Proteaceae
- Genus: Hakea
- Species: H. polyanthema

Binomial name
- Hakea polyanthema Diels
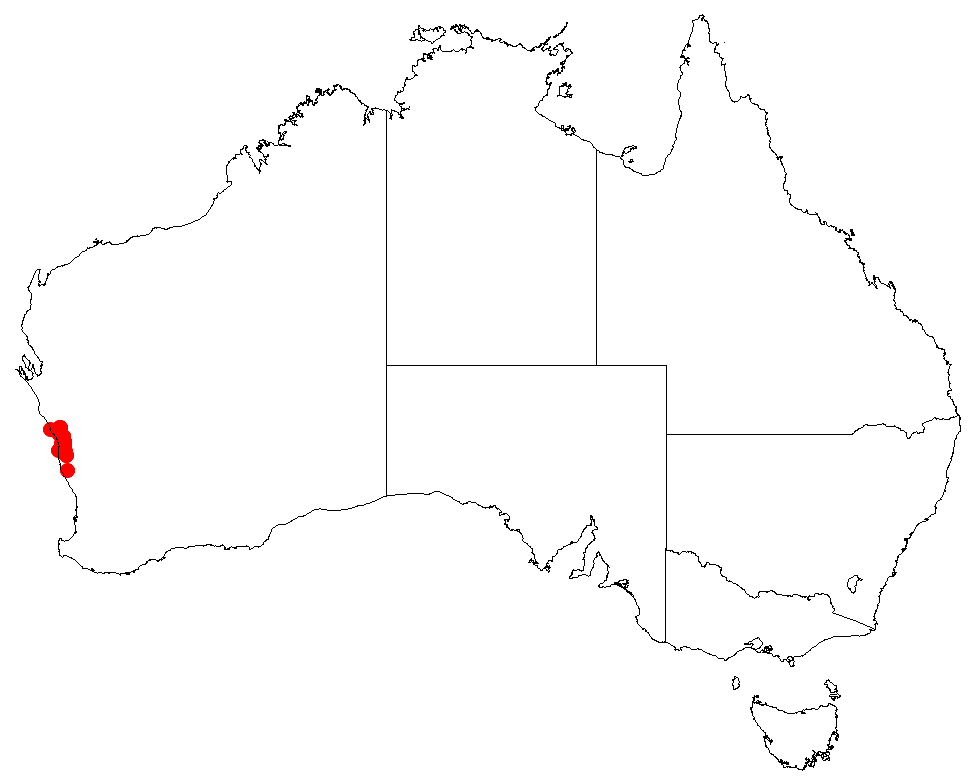
- Occurrence data from Australasian Virtual Herbarium

= Hakea polyanthema =

Species of shrub endemic to Western Australia

Hakea polyanthema is a species of flowering plant in the family Proteaceae that is endemic to Western Australia. It is a shrub with needle-shaped leaves and small groups of small unpleasantly scented flowers in leaf axils.

== Description ==
Hakea polyanthema is a dense multi-branched shrub that typically grows to a height of 1 to 2 metres (3.3 to 6.6 ft) with hairy branchlets. The new leaves and branchlets are covered with rusty coloured flattened, short, silky hairs. The leaves are arranged alternately, needle-shaped, 20–60 mm (0.79–2.36 in) long and 0.8–1.2 mm (0.031–0.047 in) wide. The leaves may be either curving or straight and end in a sharp upright point. The inflorescences consists of 2, 4 or 6 small white, pink or deep red flowers in leaf axils. The over-lapping bracts are 1.3 mm (0.051 in) long, pedicels 1.5–2.5 mm (0.059–0.098 in) long and densely covered in silky flattened, white-creamish hairs. The perianth is 3.5–4.2 mm (0.14–0.17 in) long with cream-yellow or white hairs near the base but those further along a rusty colour. The pistil is 5 mm (0.20 in) long. The erect ovate shaped fruit are 25 to 35 mm (0.98 to 1.38 in) long and 1.5 to 1.9 mm (0.059 to 0.075 in) wide with a corky texture, no beak and ending in a sharp pointed tip 3.5 mm (0.14 in) long. The seeds within are around 25 mm (0.98 in) in length with a wing surrounding the seed's body. Flowering occurs from August to September.

== Taxonomy and naming ==
Hakea polyanthema was first formally described in 1904 by Ludwig Diels as part of the work by Diels and Ernst Georg Pritzel and published in Botanische Jahrbücher für Systematik, Pflanzengeschichte und Pflanzengeographie. The specific epithet polyanthema is taken from the Greek poly- meaning "many", and anthemon meaning "flower", possibly in reference to the apparent density of the flowers.

== Distribution and habitat ==
This species is endemic to a small area on the west coast, Mid West and the Wheatbelt regions of Western Australia between Geraldton and Dandaragan. It grows in sandy soils, loam and gravel in scrubland and heath.
