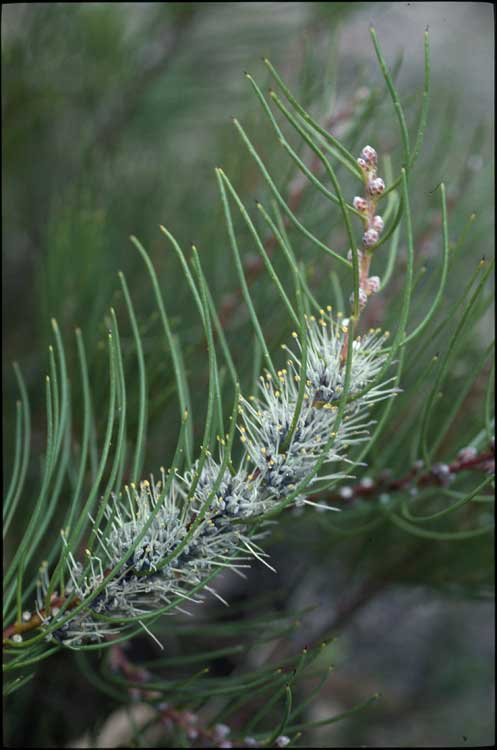
- Hakea lehmanniana (cultivated)

Conservation status
- Vulnerable (IUCN 3.1)

Scientific classification
- Kingdom: Plantae
- Clade: Tracheophytes
- Clade: Angiosperms
- Clade: Eudicots
- Order: Proteales
- Family: Proteaceae
- Genus: Hakea
- Species: H. lehmanniana

Binomial name
- Hakea lehmanniana Meisn.
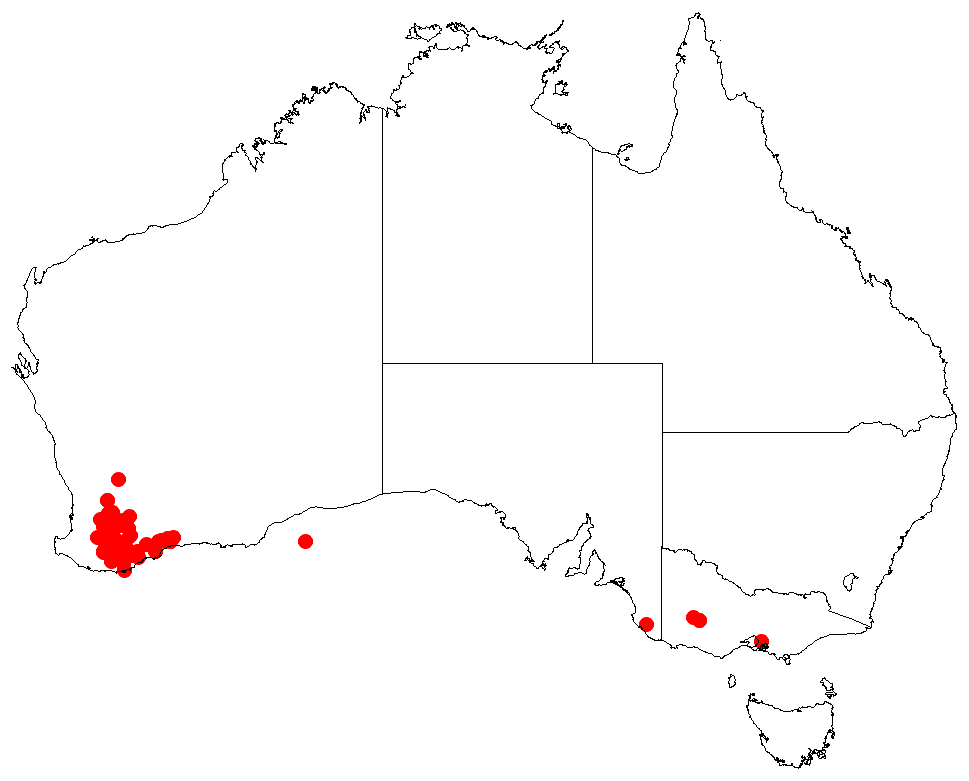
- Occurrence data from AVH

= Hakea lehmanniana =

Blue hakea

Species of shrub endemic to Western Australia

Hakea lehmanniana, commonly known as the blue hakea, is a shrub in the family Proteaceae. It has needle-shaped prickly leaves and blue flowers during winter months. It is endemic to an area in the southern Wheatbelt and Great Southern regions of Western Australia.

== Description ==
Hakea lehmanniana is a prickly, dense shrub typically growing to a height of 0.6 to 1.8 metres (2 to 6 ft) and does not form a lignotuber. It blooms from June to August and produces attractive purple-blue fading to blue or white flowers in dense clusters in upper leaf axils. The leaves are glabrous, terete, 2–7 cm (0.8–3 in) long by 1–2 mm (0.04–0.08 in) thick and ending in a sharp point at the apex. The fruit are 3 dimensional, 2–3 cm (0.8–1 in) long by 1.5–2 cm (0.6–0.8 in) wide with a very rough prickly surface a unique feature which identifies this species.

== Distribution and habitat ==
Blue hakea grows from Pingelly ranging south to Albany and east to Ravensthorpe. Grows in heath or shrubland on gravelly-loam, sand or sand over laterite in sun or semi-shade. An adaptable species frost and drought tolerant and may be used as a ground cover and wildlife habitat.

== Taxonomy and naming ==
Hakea lehmanniana was first formally described in 1845 by Swiss botanist Carl Meisner and the description was published in Plantae Preissianae. The species was named in honour of the German botanist, Johann Georg Christian Lehmann.

== Conservation status ==
Hakea lehmanniana is classified as vulnerable on the IUCN Red List of Threatened Species and is classified as "not threatened" by the Western Australian Government.
