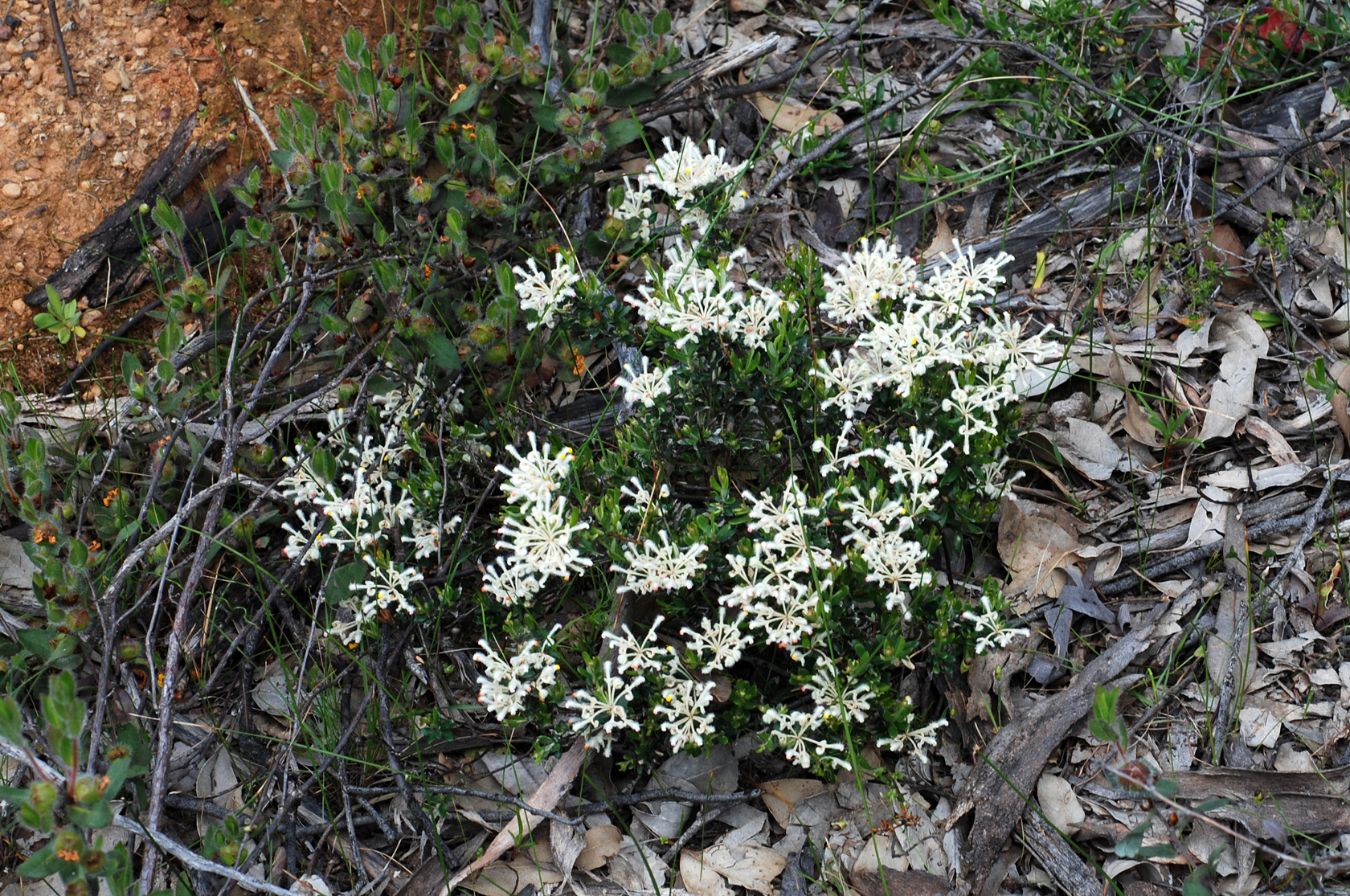
- Grevillea candolleana

Conservation status
- Least Concern (IUCN 3.1)

- Priority Two — Poorly Known Taxa (DEC)

Scientific classification
- Kingdom: Plantae
- Clade: Embryophytes
- Clade: Tracheophytes
- Clade: Spermatophytes
- Clade: Angiosperms
- Clade: Eudicots
- Order: Proteales
- Family: Proteaceae
- Genus: Grevillea
- Species: G. candolleana

Binomial name
- Grevillea candolleana Meisn.

= Grevillea candolleana =

Toodyay grevillea

Species of plant endemic to Western Australia

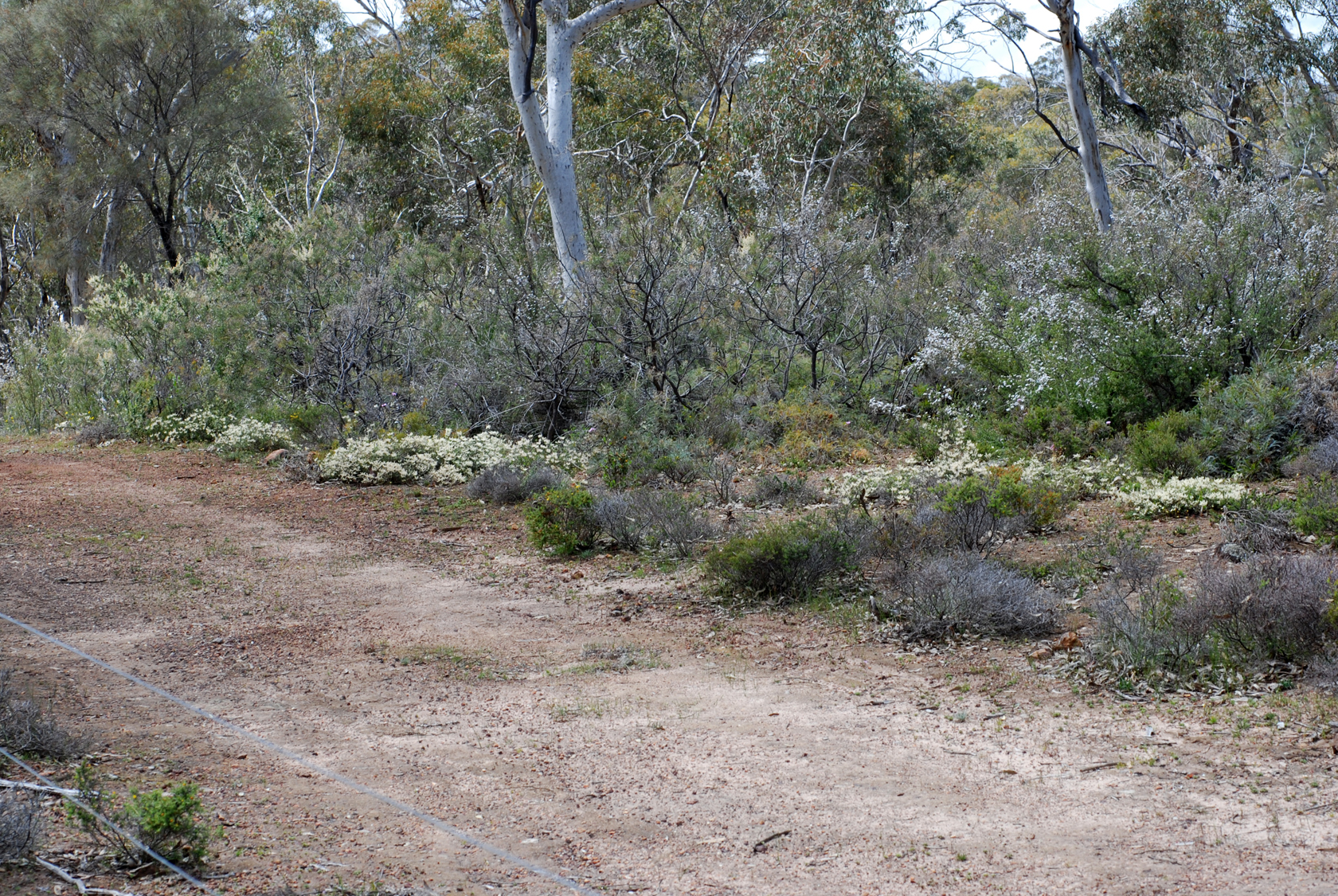
Habit

Grevillea candolleana, commonly known as the Toodyay grevillea, is a species of flowering plant in the family Proteaceae and is endemic to a restricted part of the south-west of Western Australia. It is a shrub with narrow egg-shaped to linear leaves and white to cream-coloured flowers.

== Description ==
Grevillea candolleana is a shrub that typically grows to a height of 20–80 cm (7.9–31.5 in). Its leaves are narrow egg-shaped to narrow elliptic or linear, 10–35 mm (0.39–1.38 in) long and 1–9 mm (0.039–0.354 in) wide, with the edges turned down or rolled under. The lower surface of the leaves is covered with soft, felty hairs. The flowers are white to cream-coloured, the pistil 9.5–11.5 mm (0.37–0.45 in) long and covered with shaggy hairs. There is a tongue-shaped, yellow appendage 2–3 mm (0.079–0.118 in) long on the style, that turns orange, then red as it ages. Flowering mostly occurs from August to November and the fruit is a softly-hairy follicle 8.5–11 mm (0.33–0.43 in) long.

== Taxonomy ==
Grevillea candolleana was first formally described in 1845 by Carl Meissner in Johann Georg Christian Lehmann's Plantae Preissianae from specimens collected by James Drummond in the Swan River Colony. The specific epithet (candolleana) honours Augustin Pyramus de Candolle.

== Distribution and habitat ==
This grevillea grows in woodland in a small area around Toodyay in the Avon Wheatbelt, Jarrah Forest and Swan Coastal Plain biogeographic regions of south-western Western Australia.

== Conservation status ==
Grevillea candicans is listed as priority two by the Western Australian Government Department of Biodiversity, Conservation and Attractions, meaning that it is poorly known and from only one or a few locations.
