= Grevillea polyacida =

Scientific classification
- Kingdom: Plantae
- Clade: Tracheophytes
- Clade: Angiosperms
- Clade: Eudicots
- Order: Proteales
- Family: Proteaceae
- Genus: Grevillea
- Species: G. polyacida

Binomial name
- Grevillea polyacida McGill.

Species of plant endemic to Australia

Grevillea polyacida is a species of flowering plant in the family Proteaceae and is endemic to the Top End of the Northern Territory in Australia. It is an open, erect shrub with egg-shaped leaves, the edges with sharply pointed teeth, and clusters of hairy, greenish flowers.

== Description ==
Grevillea polyacida is an open, erect shrub that typically grows to a height of 1–2.5 m (3 ft 3 in – 8 ft 2 in). Its leaves are egg-shaped, 60–90 mm (2.4–3.5 in) long and 30–60 mm (1.2–2.4 in) wide with 15 to 31 sharply-pointed teeth on the edges, the lower surface covered with woolly hairs. The flowers are arranged on the ends of branches on a rachis 30–50 mm (1.2–2.0 in) long and are greenish with tawny hairs, the pistil 9–11 mm (0.35–0.43 in) long and the style green to brown. Flowering mainly occurs from July to October and the fruit is an oblong, hairy follicle 13–19 mm (0.51–0.75 in) long.

== Taxonomy ==
Grevillea polyacida was first formally described in 1986 by Donald McGillivray in his book New Names in Grevillea (Proteaceae) from specimens collected on Eva Valley Station in 1973. The specific epithet (polyacida) means "many points", referring to the sharp teeth on the leaves.

== Distribution and habitat ==
This species occurs in the Top End of the Northern Territory, in eastern Arnhem Land, including Kakadu National Park, where it grows in eucalypt woodland on sandstone.
