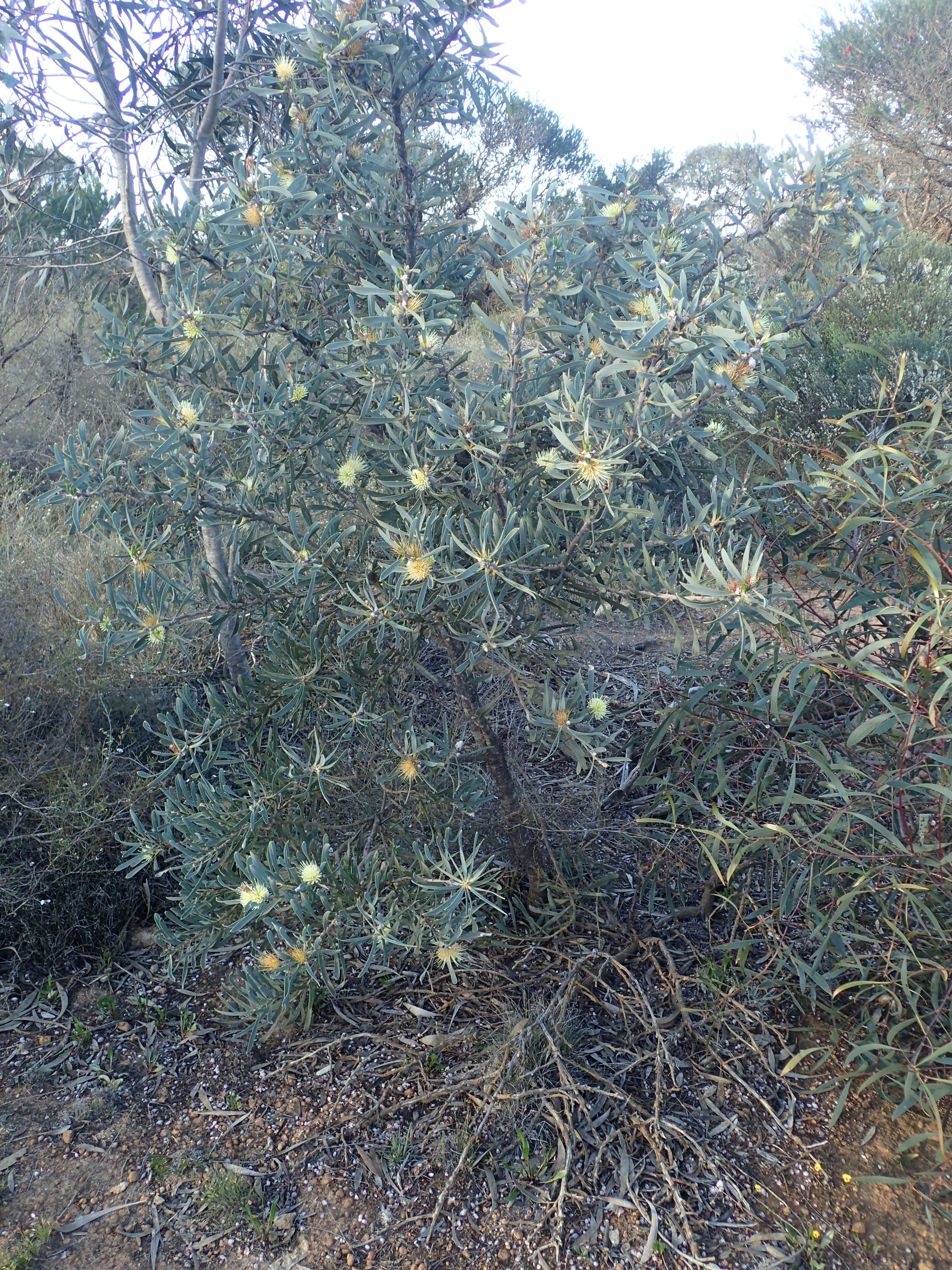
- Hakea cinerea growing north-east of Esperance

Conservation status
- Endangered (IUCN 3.1)

Scientific classification
- Kingdom: Plantae
- Clade: Tracheophytes
- Clade: Angiosperms
- Clade: Eudicots
- Order: Proteales
- Family: Proteaceae
- Genus: Hakea
- Species: H. cinerea

Binomial name
- Hakea cinerea R.Br.
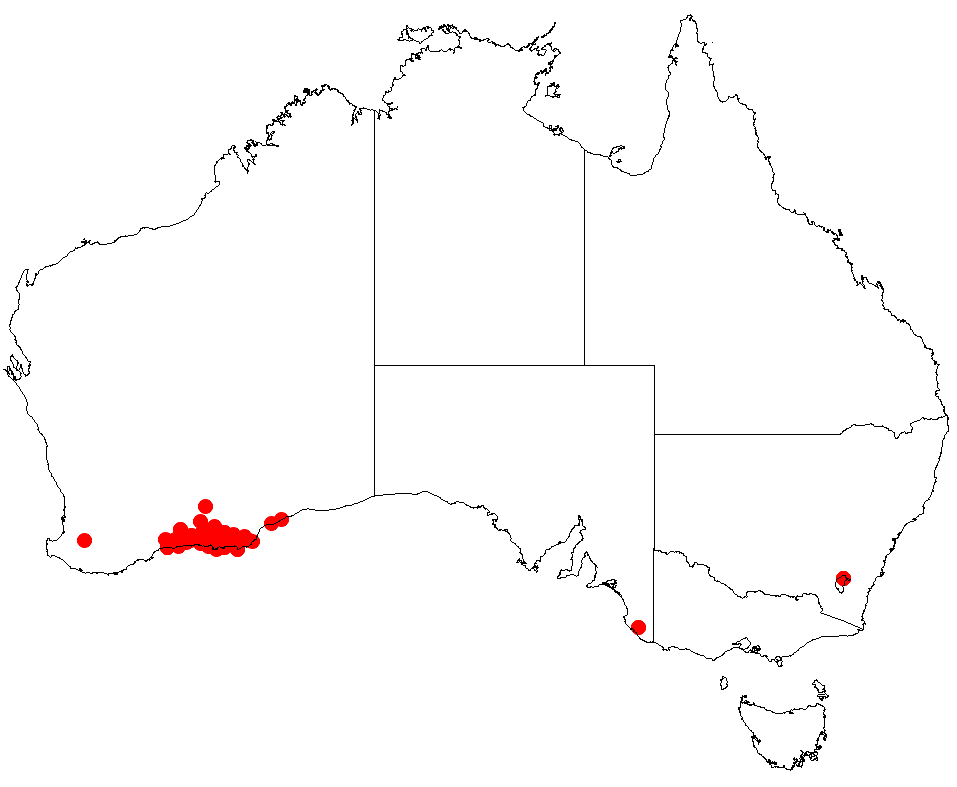
- Occurrence data from Australasian Virtual Herbarium

= Hakea cinerea =

Species of shrub native to Western Australia

Hakea cinerea, commonly known as ashy or grey hakea, is a shrub in the family Proteaceae native to areas along the south coast in the Goldfields-Esperance region of Western Australia. It is a showy ornamental species bearing creamy-white flowers aging to orange with contrasting ash coloured grey-green leaves.

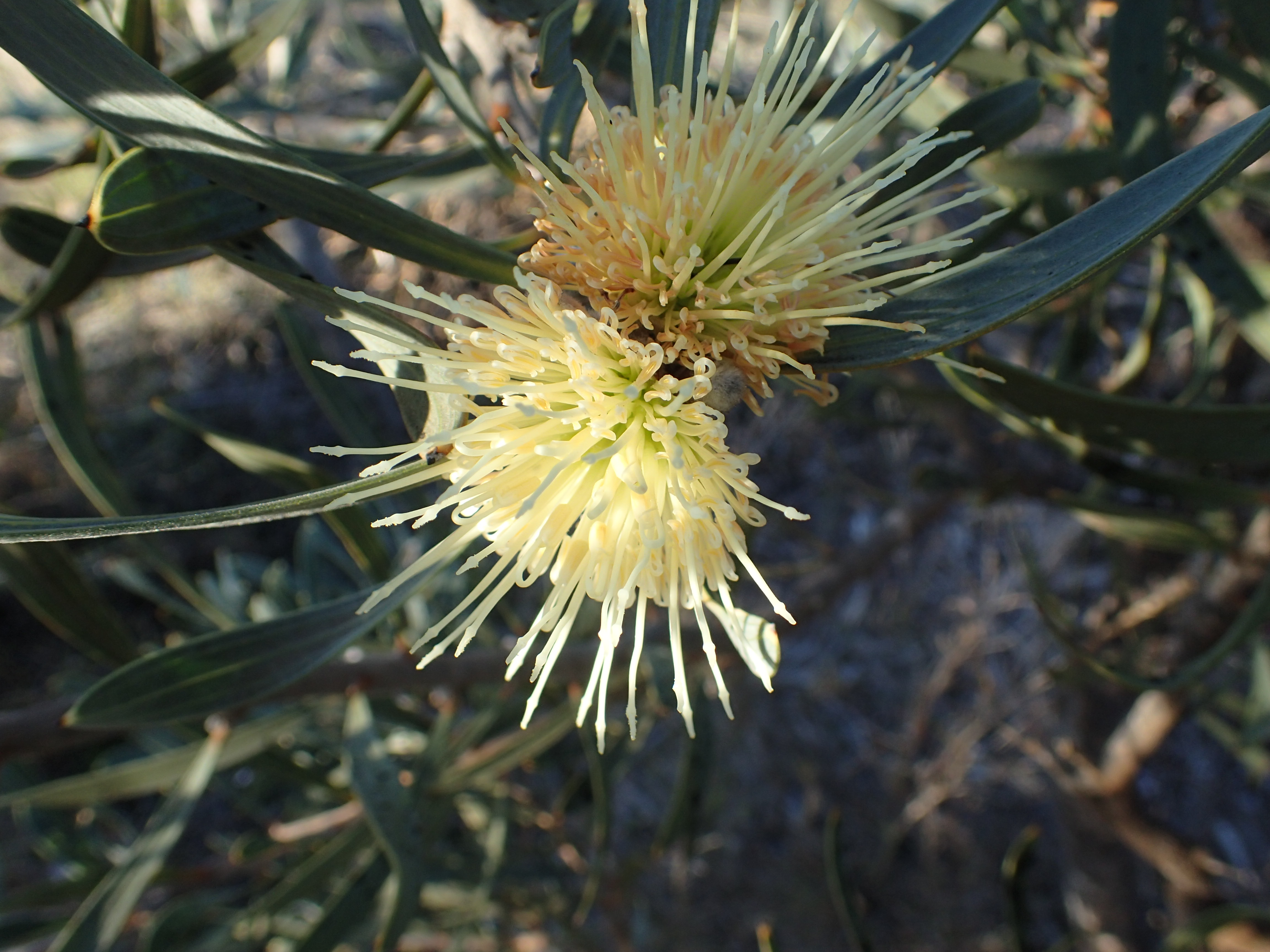
Foliage and flowers

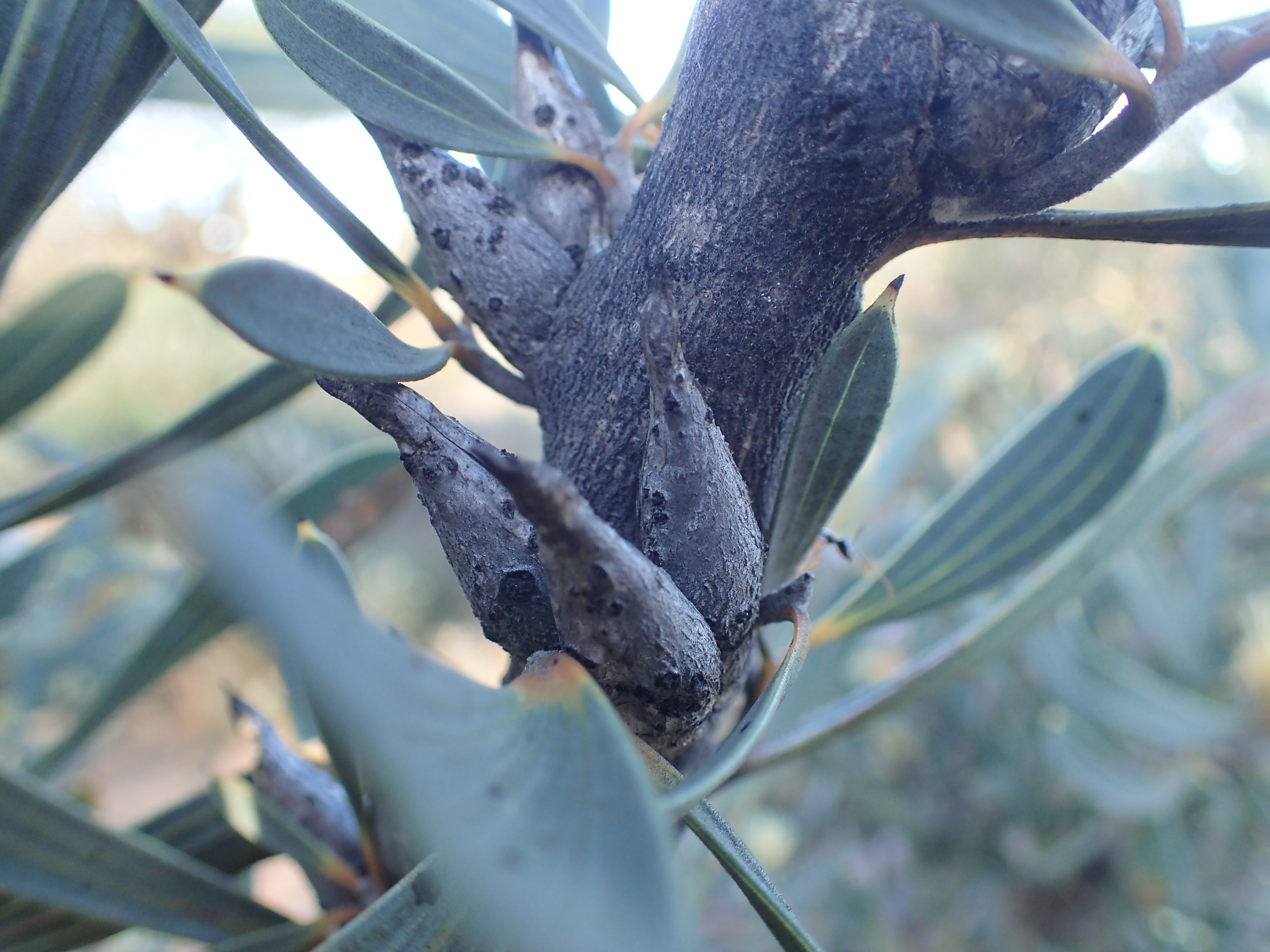
Fruit

== Description ==
Hakea cinerea is a rounded, rigid, non-lignotuberous shrub typically growing to a height of 0.7 to 2.5 metres (2.3 to 8.2 ft) with ascending branches. The inflorescence consists of 40-56 large showy creamy-white and yellow flowers turning orange with age in clusters in the leaf axils from August to November. The smooth pedicels are 4–6 mm (0.16–0.24 in) long. The style is 22–23 mm (0.87–0.91 in) long. Attractive stiff blue-grey leaves are rounded, 6–16 cm (2.4–6.3 in) long and 8–18 mm (0.31–0.71 in) wide tapering to a blunt point at the apex. Leaves are yellow at the base with 3 prominent grey-green longitudinal veins, 1–3 above and 3–6 on the underside. The small narrow fruit have a slightly rough surface and grow erect in groups of 1-5 in leaf axils are 2.2–2.5 cm (0.87–0.98 in) long and 0.6–0.9 mm (0.024–0.035 in) wide.

== Taxonomy and naming ==
Hakea cinerea was first formally described by Robert Brown in 1810 and published in Transactions of the Linnean Society of London. The specific epithet (cinerea) is derived from the Latin word cinereus meaning "of ashes", "ash coloured" or "ashen", referring to the colour of the foliage.

== Distribution and habitat ==
Hakea cinerea is found from Ravensthorpe to Esperance and Israelite Bay. Has also been recorded at Point Culver at the western end of the Great Australian Bight. This species grows in a well-drained sunny site, preferring low-lying deep sand in heath, gravelly soils or low scrubland. An ornamental species good for windbreak or wildlife habitat.

== Conservation status ==
Hakea cinerea is presently classified "not threatened" by the Western Australian Government Department of Parks and Wildlife.
