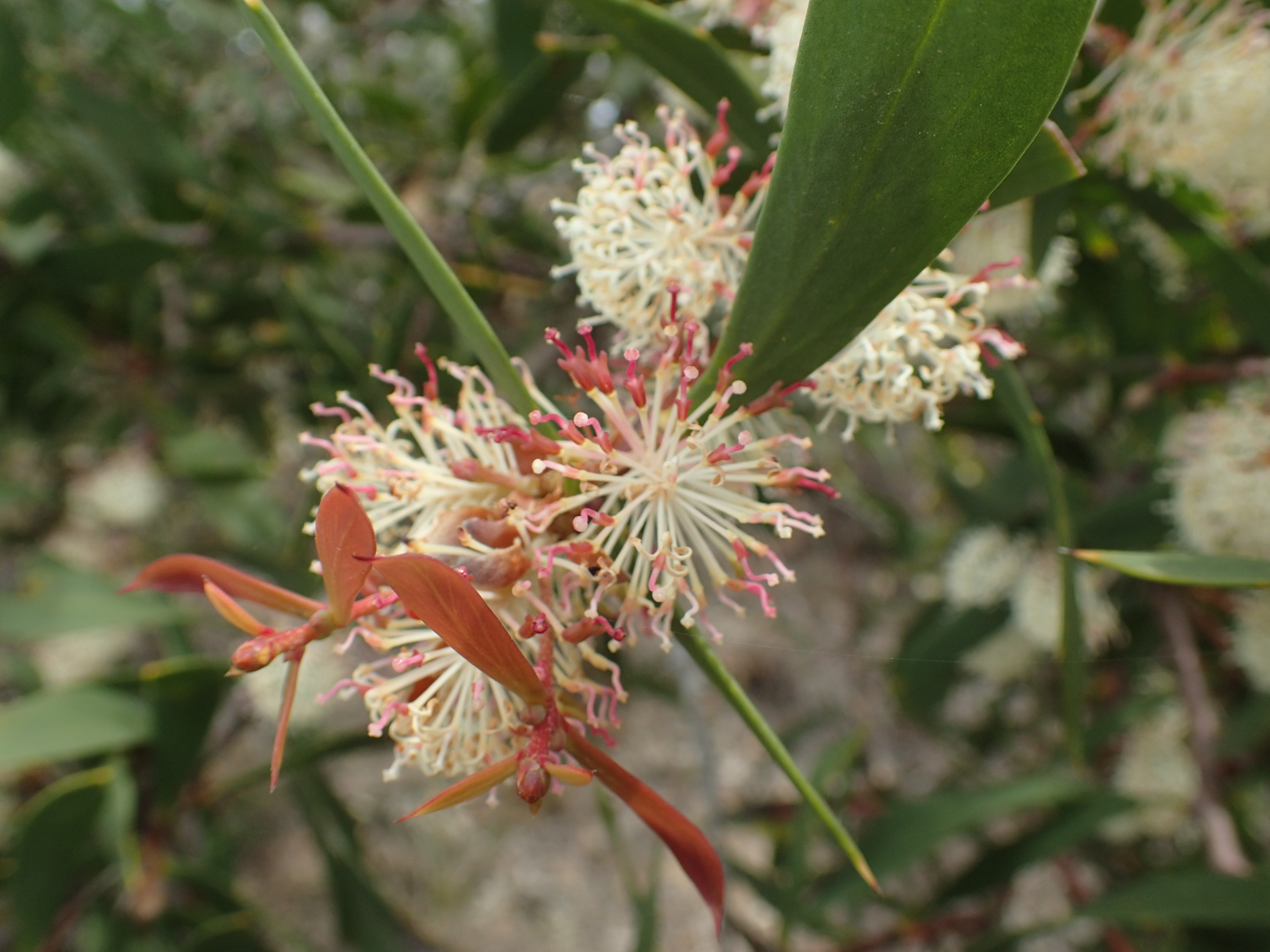
- Hakea nitida growing near the Stirling Range National Park

Conservation status
- Endangered (IUCN 3.1)

Scientific classification
- Kingdom: Plantae
- Clade: Tracheophytes
- Clade: Angiosperms
- Clade: Eudicots
- Order: Proteales
- Family: Proteaceae
- Genus: Hakea
- Species: H. nitida

Binomial name
- Hakea nitida R.Br.
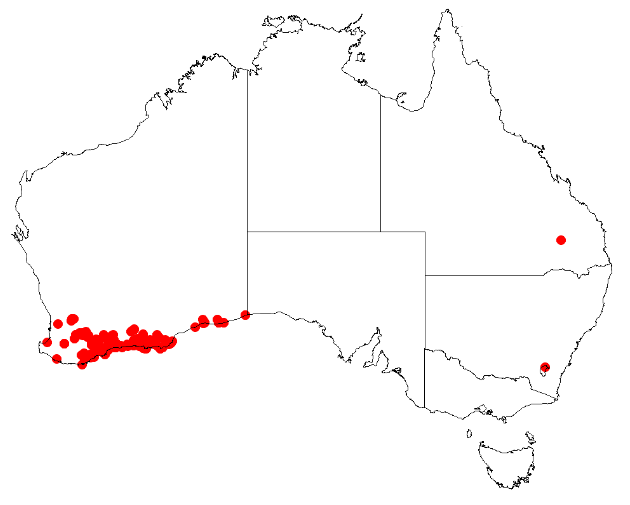
- Occurrence data from AVH

= Hakea nitida =

Frog hakea

Species of shrub endemic to Western Australia

Hakea nitida, commonly called the frog hakea or shining hakea, is a shrub of the family Proteaceae and is endemic to an area in the southern Wheatbelt, Great Southern and Goldfields-Esperance regions of Western Australia.

== Description ==
Hakea nitida is an erect shrub typically grows to a height of 1 to 3 metres (3.3 to 9.8 ft) and does not form a lignotuber. It blooms from July to September and produces white-cream and yellow flowers. The plant has glabrous branchlets that are not glaucous. The flat rigid leaves are subpetiolate with a narrowly elliptic to obovate shape. Leaves are 1.5 to 9 centimetres (0.6 to 3.5 in) in length and 10 to 30 millimetres (0.4 to 1.2 in) wide and narrowly cuneate. Inflorescences are axillary or terminal on short shoots with 16 to 36 flowers. These form obliquely ovate fruit, 2.5 to 3.5 centimetres (1.0 to 1.4 in) long and 1.5 to 2.5 centimetres (0.6 to 1.0 in) wide. The fruit are black-pusticulate, with horns approximately 6 millimetres (0.24 in) long. Seeds are narrowly obovate with wings broadly down one side of seed body, narrowly down the other. The seed pods resemble warty toads or frogs giving the plant the unusual common name, the frog hakea.

== Taxonomy and naming ==
The species was first formally described by Robert Brown in 1810 and the description was published in Transactions of the Linnean Society of London. The specific epithet (nitidus) is a Latin word meaning "bright", "shining" or "elegant", referring to the usually glossy leaf.

== Distribution and habitat ==
Frog hakea grows in southern Western Australia from Busselton to Eucla on sandy-loam, clay and gravel in mallee or heath. An ornamental shrub, a good habitat plant for wildlife.

== Conservation status ==
Hakea nitida is classified as not threatened by the Western Australian Government.

== Gallery ==
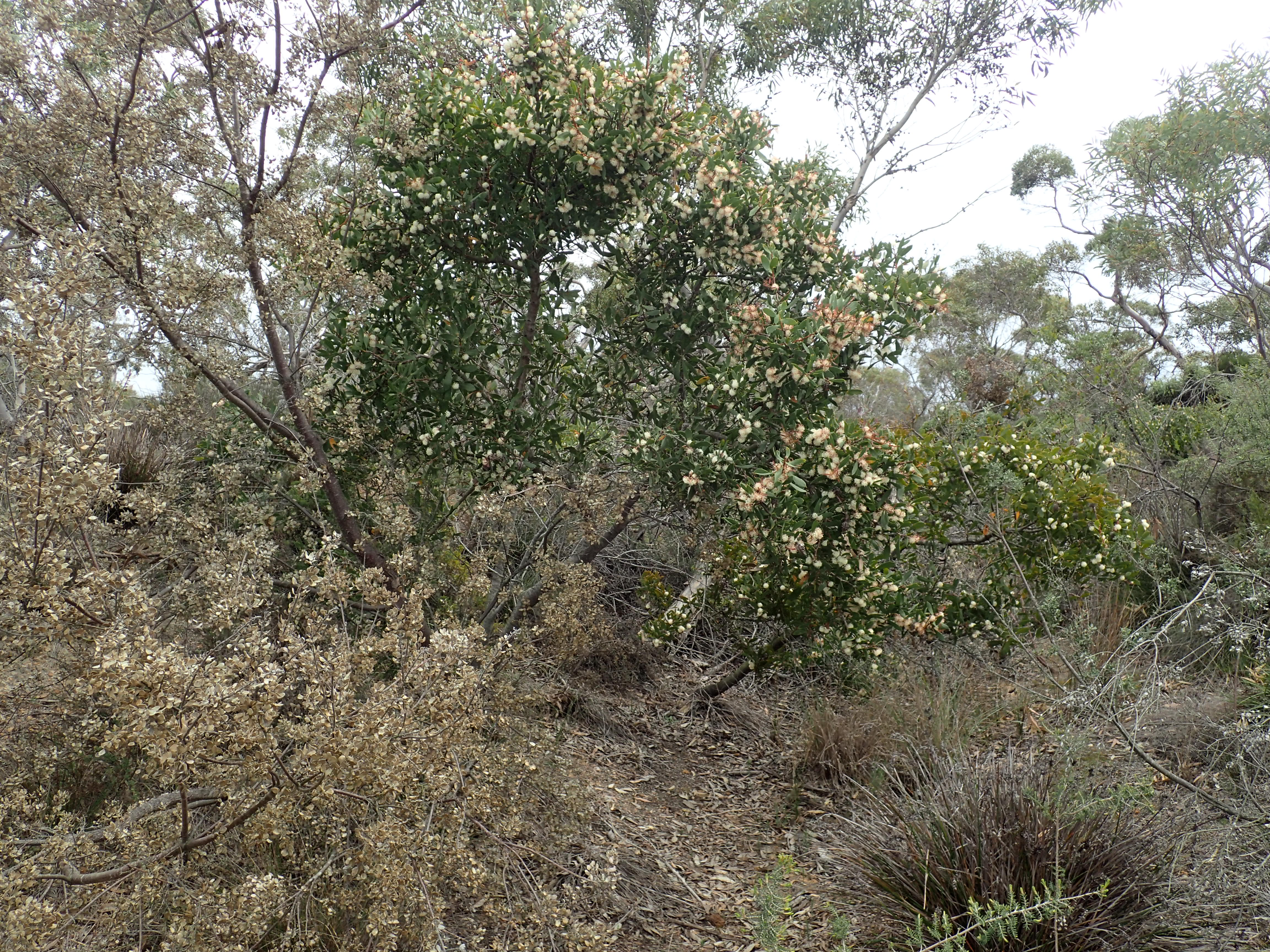
Habit

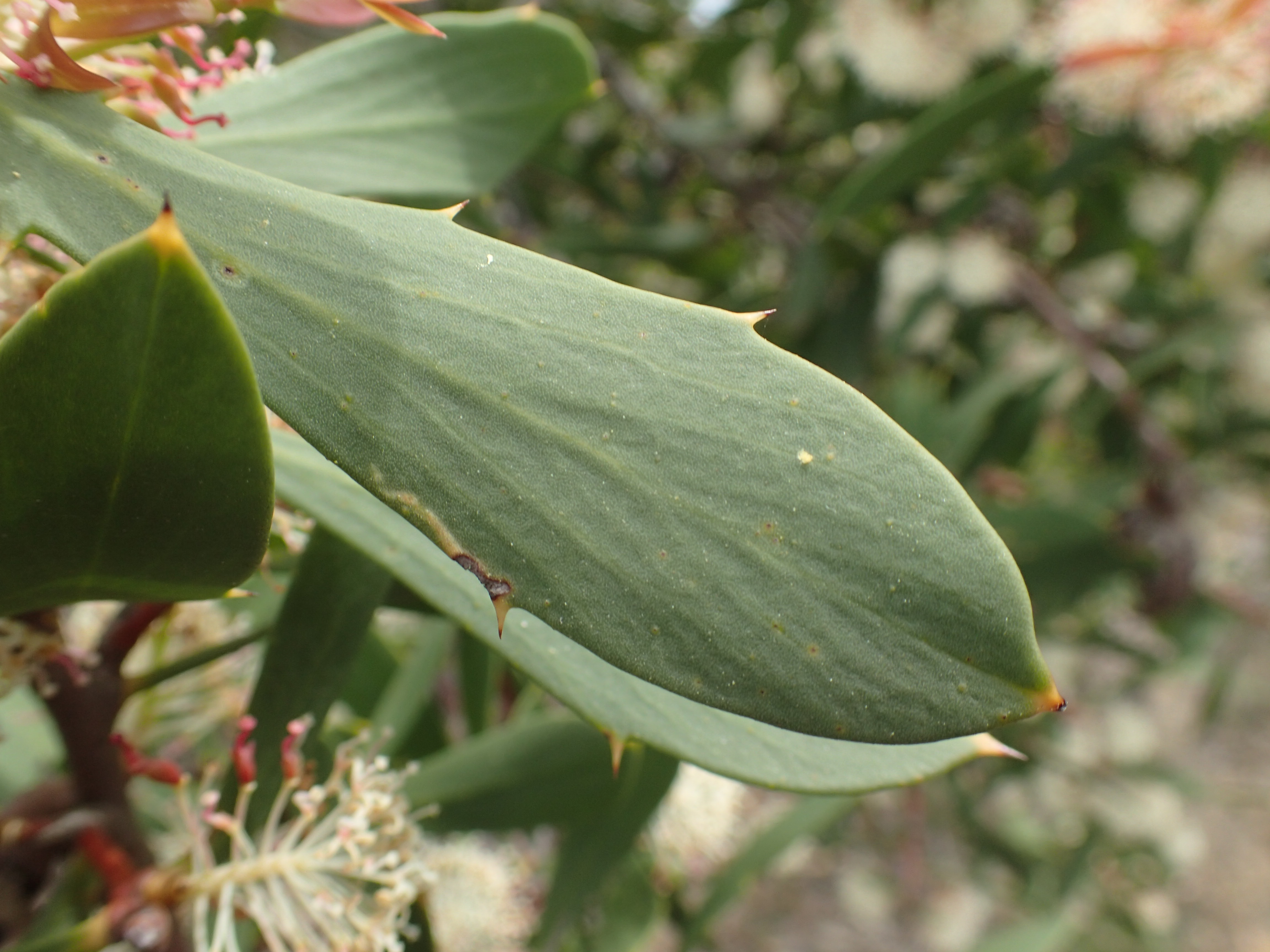
Typical leaf

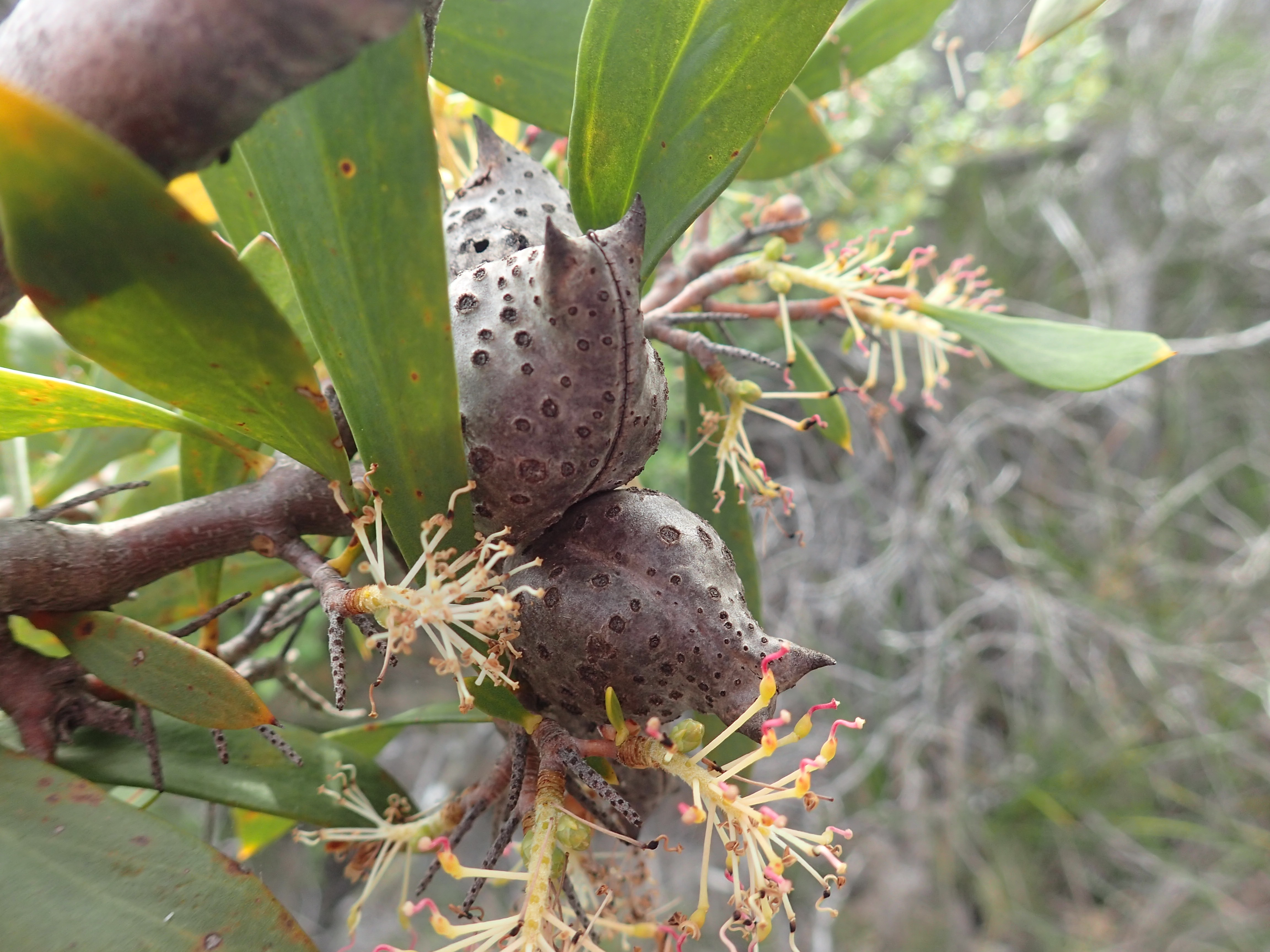
Fruit
