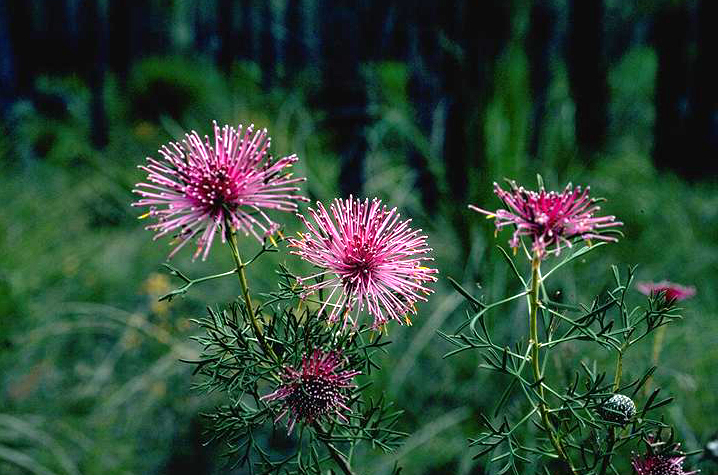

Scientific classification
- Kingdom: Plantae
- Clade: Tracheophytes
- Clade: Angiosperms
- Clade: Eudicots
- Order: Proteales
- Family: Proteaceae
- Genus: Isopogon
- Species: I. crithmifolius

Binomial name
- Isopogon crithmifolius F.Muell.
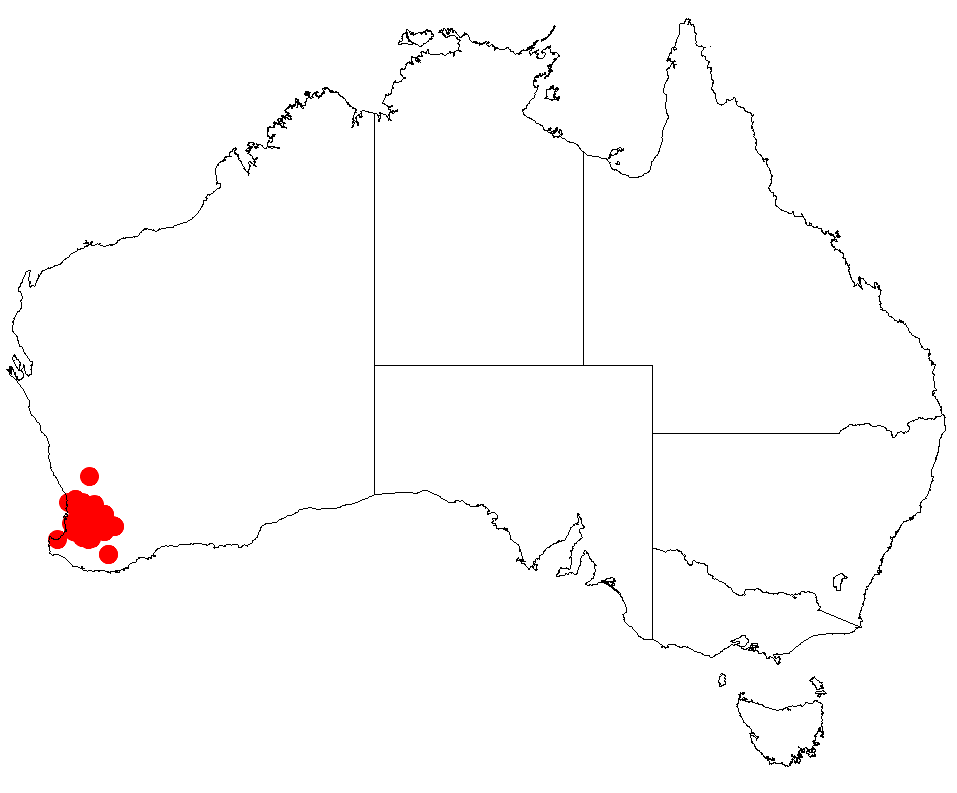
- Occurrence data from Australasian Virtual Herbarium

Synonyms
- Atylus crithmifolius (F.Muell.) Kuntze

= Isopogon crithmifolius =

Species of shrub endemic to Western Australia

Isopogon crithmifolius is a species of plant in the family Proteaceae and is endemic to the south-west of Western Australia. It is a shrub with divided leaves and more or less spherical heads of glabrous reddish pink flowers.

== Description ==
Isopogon crithmifolius is a shrub that typically grows to a height of 0.4–1.3 m (1 ft 4 in – 4 ft 3 in) and has hairy pale brown branchlets. The leaves are 150–400 mm (5.9–15.7 in) long on a petiole 12–25 mm (0.47–0.98 in) long, divided into two or three lobes, the lobes often further divided. The flowers are arranged in more or less spherical, sessile heads 30–35 mm (1.2–1.4 in) long in diameter with egg-shaped involucral bracts at the base. The flowers are 25–30 mm (0.98–1.18 in) long, reddish pink and glabrous. Flowering occurs from September to October and the fruit is a hairy oval nut, fused with others in a spherical cone 15–20 mm (0.59–0.79 in) in diameter.

== Taxonomy ==
Isopogon crithmifolius was first formally described in 1868 by Ferdinand von Mueller in Fragmenta phytographiae Australiae from specimens collected by James Drummond.

== Distribution and habitat ==
This isopogon grows in forest and woodland from near Perth to near Cranbrook in the Avon Wheatbelt, Jarrah Forest and Swan Coastal Plain biogeographic regions in the south-west of Western Australia.

== Conservation status ==
Isopogon crithmifolius is classified as "not threatened" by the Government of Western Australia Department of Parks and Wildlife.
