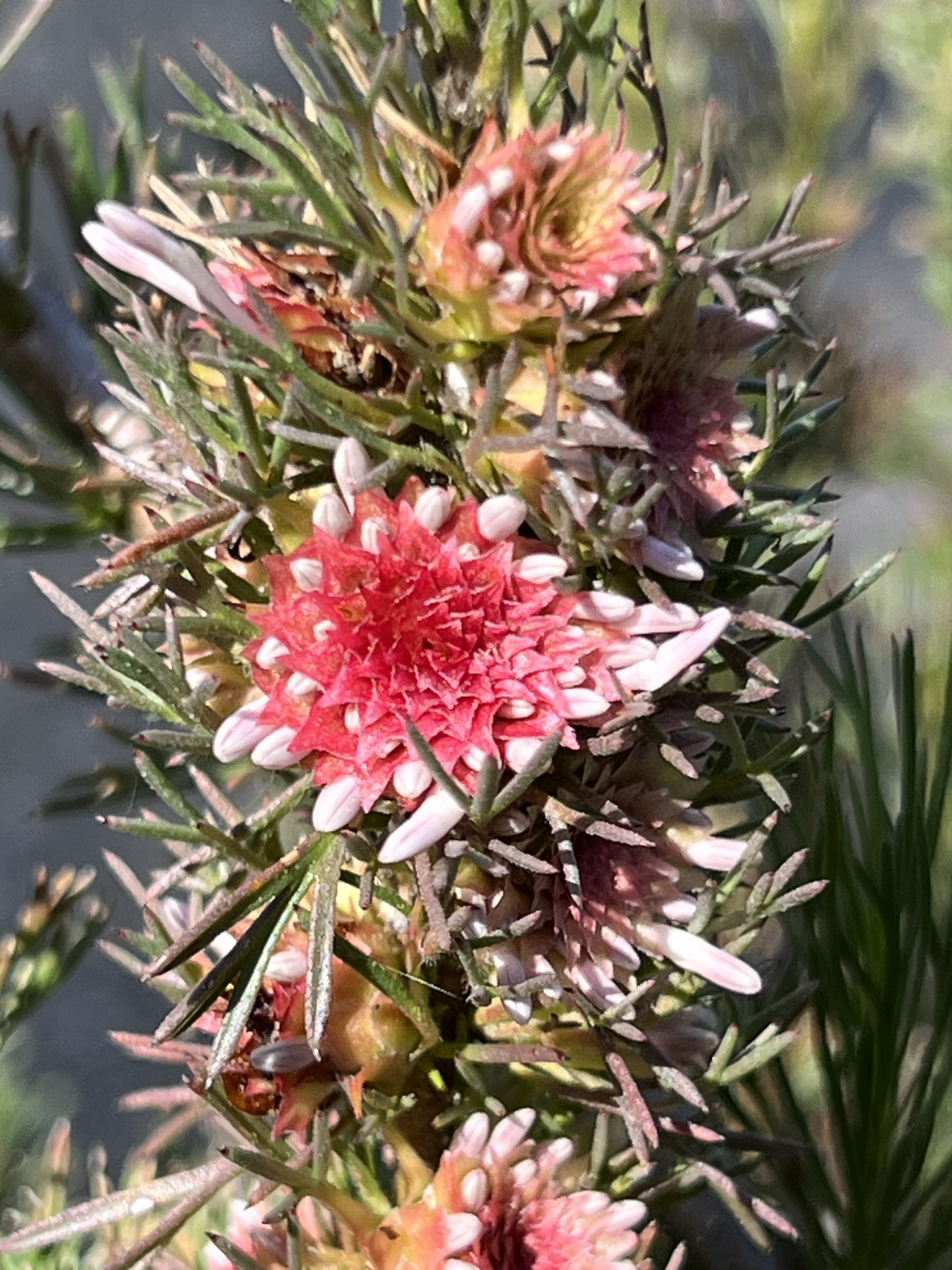

Scientific classification
- Kingdom: Plantae
- Clade: Tracheophytes
- Clade: Angiosperms
- Clade: Eudicots
- Order: Proteales
- Family: Proteaceae
- Genus: Isopogon
- Species: I. asper

Binomial name
- Isopogon asper R.Br.
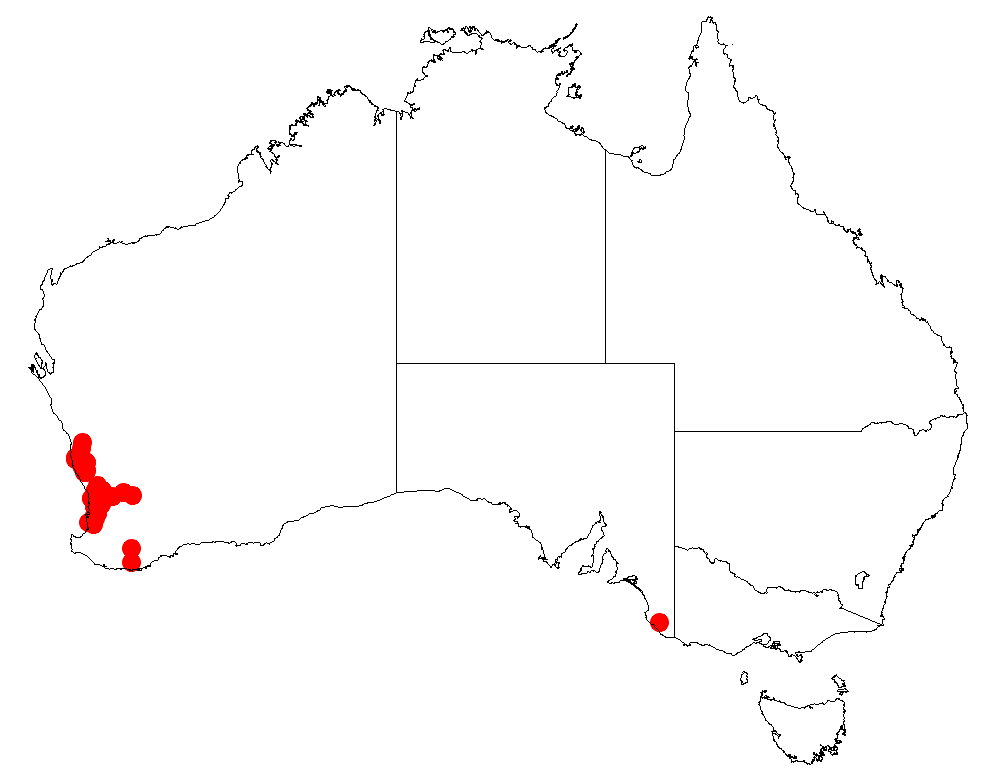
- Occurrence data from Australasian Virtual Herbarium

Synonyms
- Atylus asper (R.Br.) Kuntze; Isopogon scaber Lindl.

= Isopogon asper =

Species of shrub endemic to Western Australia

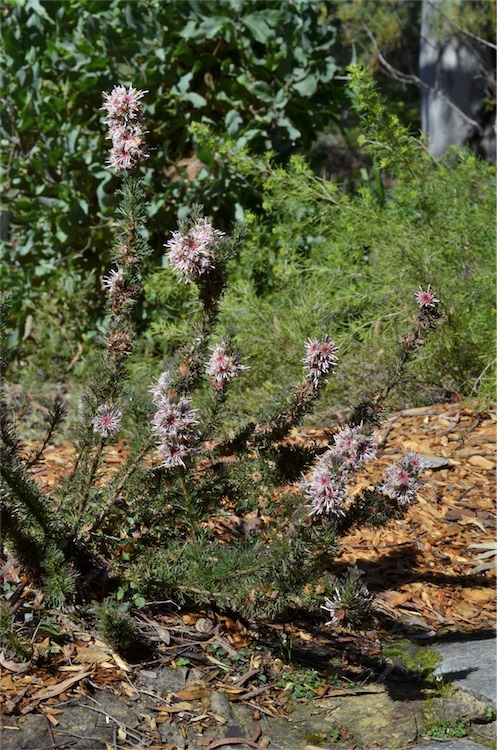
Habit

Isopogon asper is a species of plant in the family Proteaceae and is endemic to the south-west of Western Australia. It is a low shrub with crowded pinnate leaves and flattened spherical heads of glabrous pink flowers.

== Description ==
Isopogon asper is a shrub that typically grows to a height of 0.2–0.8 m (7.9 in – 2 ft 7.5 in) and has hairy reddish-brown branchlets. The leaves are crowded, up to about 20 mm (0.79 in) long and pinnate with cylindrical or grooved leaflets on a petiole up to about 13 mm (0.51 in) long. The flowers are arranged in sessile, densely clustered, flattened-spherical heads up to 40 mm (1.6 in) in diameter. The involucral bracts are egg-shaped and pointed and the flowers are about 18 mm (0.71 in) long, pink and glabrous. Flowering occurs from June to October and the fruit is a hairy nut, fused in a spherical head up to 20 mm (0.79 in) in diameter.

== Taxonomy ==
Isopogon asper was first formally described in 1830 by Robert Brown in the Supplementum to his Prodromus Florae Novae Hollandiae et Insulae Van Diemen from specimens collected in 1827 near the Swan River, by Charles Fraser.

== Distribution and habitat ==
This isopogon grows in low open heath, often with soil derived from granite, from Harvey to near Jurien Bay in the south-west of Western Australia.

== Conservation status ==
This isopogon is classified as "not threatened" by the Government of Western Australia Department of Parks and Wildlife.
