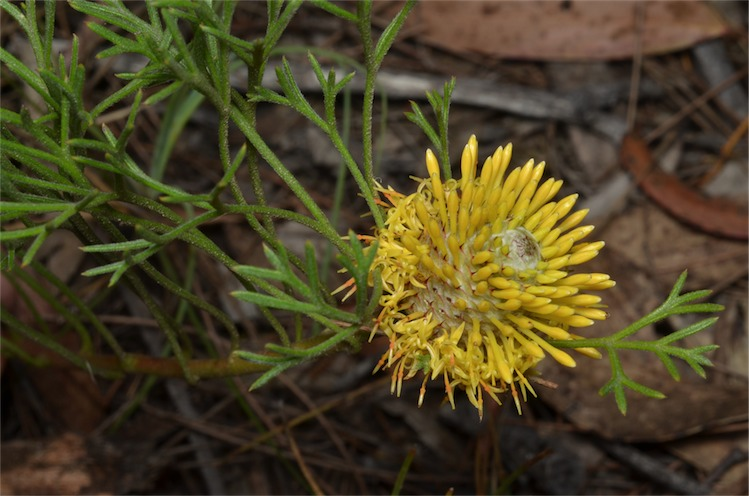

Scientific classification
- Kingdom: Plantae
- Clade: Tracheophytes
- Clade: Angiosperms
- Clade: Eudicots
- Order: Proteales
- Family: Proteaceae
- Genus: Isopogon
- Species: I. prostratus

Binomial name
- Isopogon prostratus McGill.
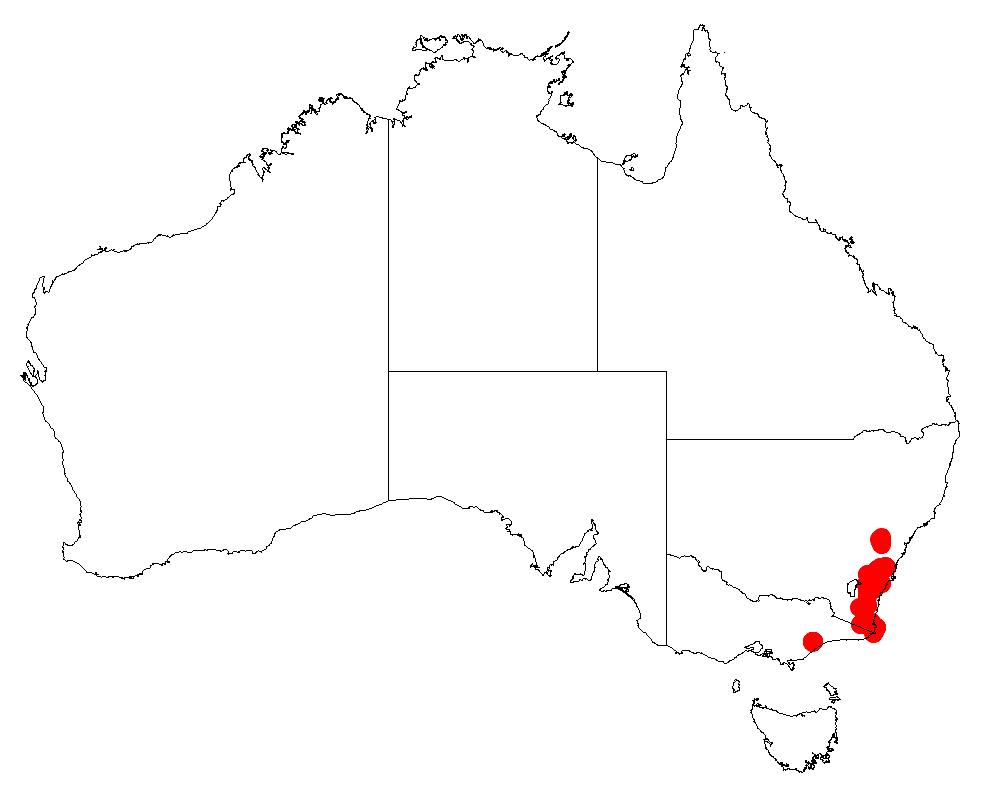
- Occurrence data from Australasian Virtual Herbarium

Synonyms
- Isopogon anemonifolius var. tenuifolius F.Muell. ex Benth.

= Isopogon prostratus =

Prostrate cone-bush

Species of shrub native to Australia

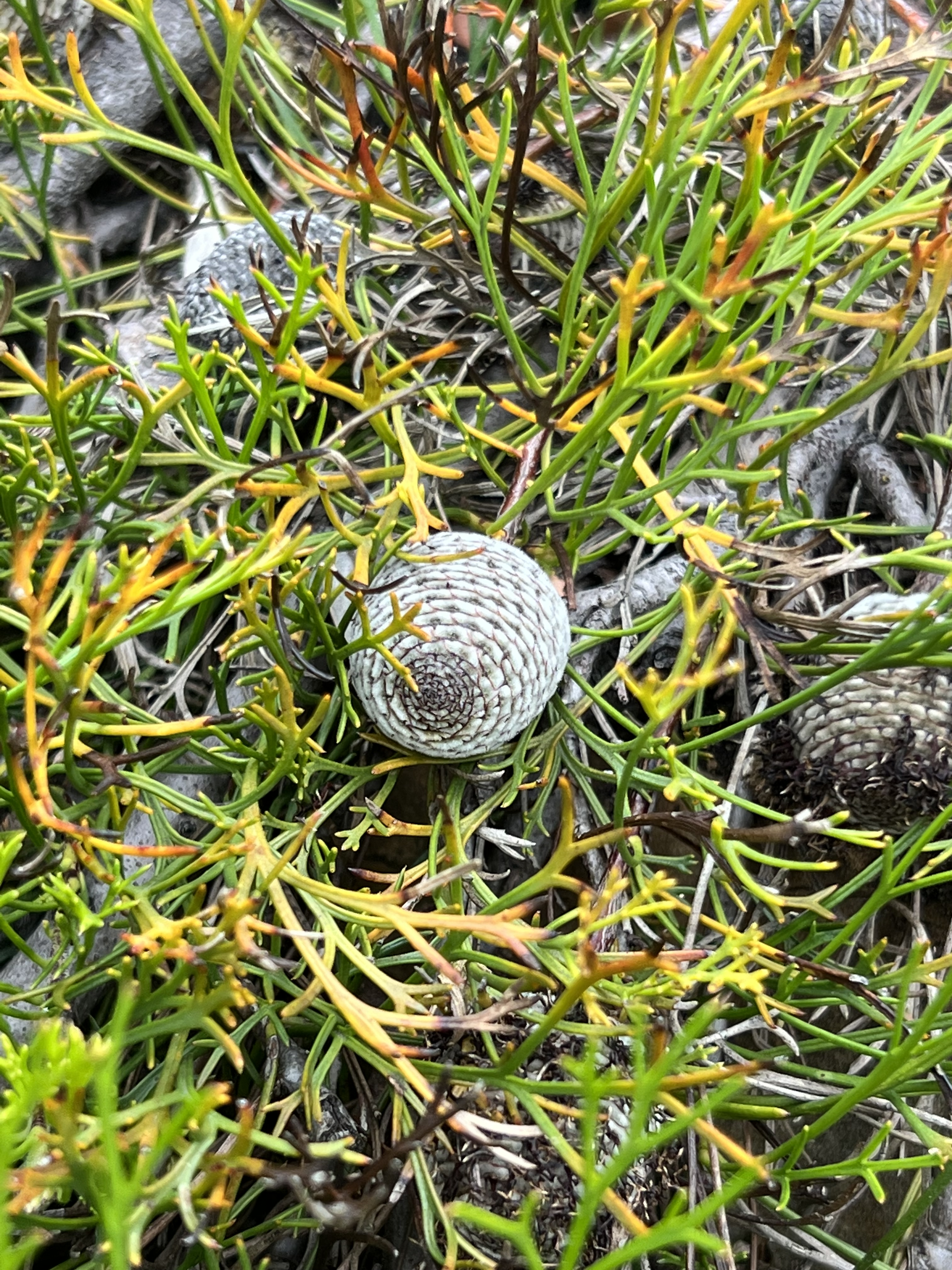
Fruit

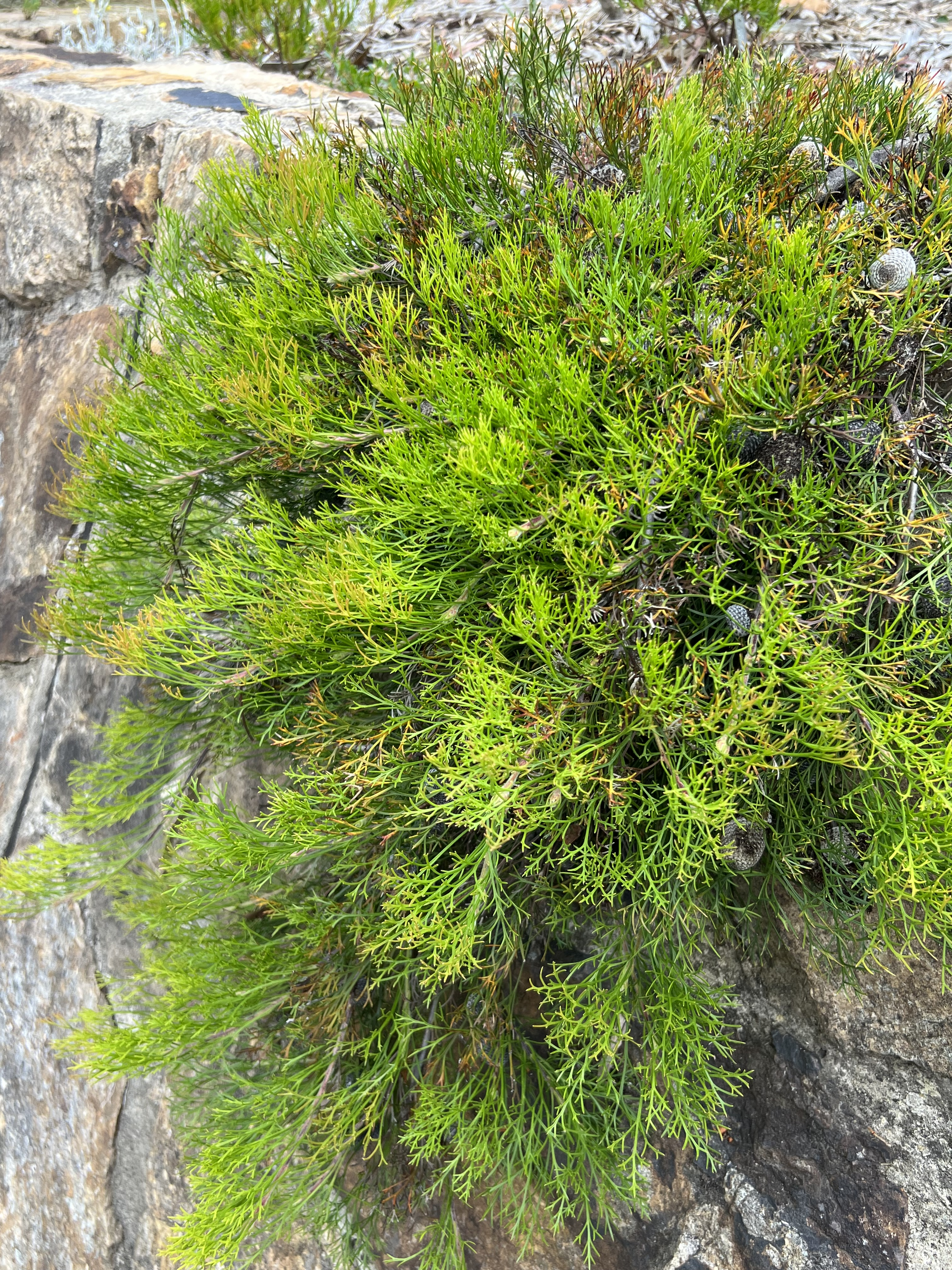
Habit

Isopogon prostratus, commonly known as prostrate cone-bush, is a species of plant in the family Proteaceae and is endemic to south-eastern Australia. It is a prostrate shrub with divided leaves with linear lobes, and more or less spherical heads of yellow flowers on the ends of branchlets.

== Description ==
Isopogon prostratus is a prostrate, spreading shrub that typically grows to 1 m (3 ft 3 in) in diameter and has reddish branchlets. The leaves are 40–100 mm (1.6–3.9 in) long and divided, with linear lobes 1–2 mm (0.039–0.079 in) wide on a petiole up to 60 mm (2.4 in) long. The flowers are arranged on the ends of branchlets in sessile, more or less spherical heads 25–35 mm (0.98–1.38 in) in diameter, with egg-shaped involucral bracts at the base. The flowers are up to 12 mm (0.47 in) long, yellow and more or less glabrous. Flowering occurs from October to December and the fruit is a hairy nut, fused with others in a more or less spherical head about 20 mm (0.79 in) in diameter.

== Taxonomy ==
Isopogon prostratus was first formally described in 1975 by Donald McGillivray in the journal "Telopea" from specimens collected in 1860 by Ferdinand von Mueller near Twofold Bay.

== Distribution and habitat ==
This isopogon usually grows in heath of forest, often on exposed sites, on the tablelands between the Newnes Plateau and the Tuross River in New South Wales. It is only known from two disjunct areas in Victoria, near Providence Ponds and on the Howe Range.
