= Isopogon panduratus =

Scientific classification
- Kingdom: Plantae
- Clade: Tracheophytes
- Clade: Angiosperms
- Clade: Eudicots
- Order: Proteales
- Family: Proteaceae
- Genus: Isopogon
- Species: I. panduratus

Binomial name
- Isopogon panduratus Hislop & Rye

Species of shrub endemic to Western Australia

Isopogon panduratus is a plant in the family Proteaceae and is endemic to the southwest of Western Australia. It is a spreading shrub with narrow egg-shaped leaves and spherical heads of pale pink flowers.

== Description ==
Isopogon panduratus is a shrub that typically grows to about 2 m (6 ft 7 in) high and 1.5 m (4 ft 11 in) wide with smooth brownish branchlets. The leaves are narrow egg-shaped with the narrower end towards the base, 35–125 mm (1.4–4.9 in) long and 3–19 mm (0.12–0.75 in) wide, tapering to a petiole that expands towards its base. The flowers are arranged in spherical, sessile heads about mostly forty to seventy pale pink flowers, the heads 18–30 mm (0.71–1.18 in) in diameter, the heads with three to five whorls of involucral bracts at the base. Flowering mainly occurs from June to August or August to October, depending on subspecies. The fruit is a hairy nut about 3.5 mm (0.14 in) long, fused in a spherical to flattened spherical head 9–16 mm (0.35–0.63 in) long and 10–18 mm (0.39–0.71 in) wide.

== Taxonomy and naming ==
Isopogon panduratus was first formally described in 2010 by Michael Clyde Hislop and Barbara Lynette Rye from specimens collected by Hislop in Tathra National Park in 2000. The specific epithet (panduratus) is a reference to the shape of the inner involucral bracts that of a pandura.

Hislop and Rye described two subspecies of I. panduratus and the names are accepted by the Australian Plant Census:

- Isopogon panduratus subsp. palustris Hislop & Rye has mature leaves 3–8 mm (0.12–0.31 in) wide and flowers from August to October;
- Isopogon panduratus Hislop & Rye subsp. panduratus has mature leaves 7–19 mm (0.28–0.75 in) wide and flowers from June to August.

== Distribution and habitat ==
Subspecies palustris grows in heath on the coastal plain between Cervantes and near Cataby and subspecies panduratus is found in heath, sometimes Banksia woodland from near Eneabba to Watheroo National Park.
