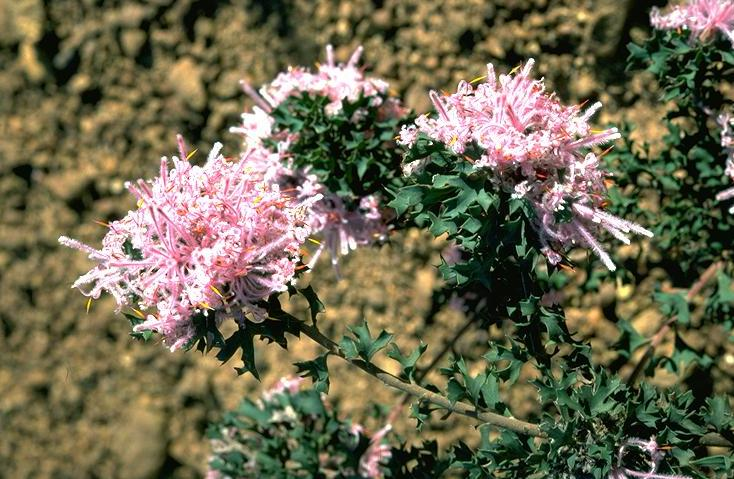
- Isopogon baxteri in the Stirling Range

Scientific classification
- Kingdom: Plantae
- Clade: Tracheophytes
- Clade: Angiosperms
- Clade: Eudicots
- Order: Proteales
- Family: Proteaceae
- Genus: Isopogon
- Species: I. baxteri

Binomial name
- Isopogon baxteri R.Br.
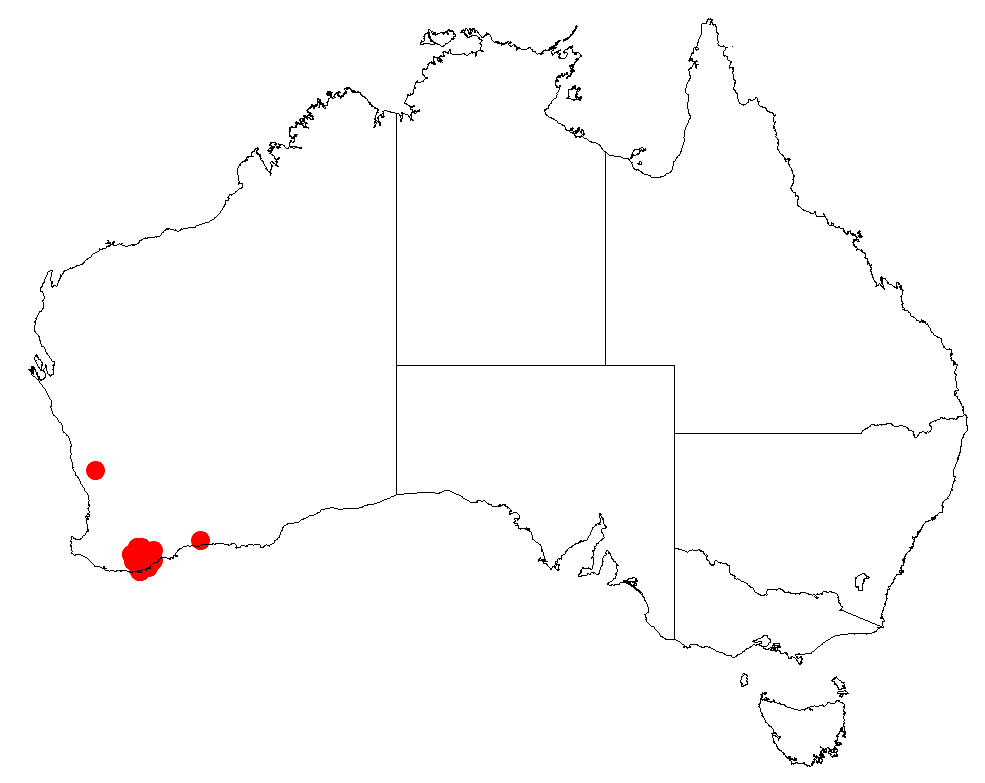
- Occurrence data from Australasian Virtual Herbarium

Synonyms
- Atylus baxteri (R.Br.) Kuntze

= Isopogon baxteri =

Stirling Range coneflower

Species of shrub endemic to Western Australia

Isopogon baxteri, commonly known as the Stirling Range coneflower, is a species of plant in the family Proteaceae and is endemic to the south-west of Western Australia. It is an erect shrub with wedge-shaped, often 3-lobed, toothed leaves and flattened spherical heads of hairy pink flowers.

== Description ==
Isopogon baxteri is an erect shrub that typically grows to a height of 0.2–1.5 m (7.9 in – 4 ft 11.1 in) and has hairy reddish to brown branchlets. The leaves are wedge-shaped, often 3-lobed, 20–45 mm (0.79–1.77 in) long with twelve to fourteen sharply-pointed teeth. The flowers are arranged in sessile, flattened-spherical heads 30–35 mm (1.2–1.4 in) in diameter with hairy, egg-shaped involucral bracts at the base. The flowers are about 35 mm (1.4 in) long, pink and covered with greyish hairs. Flowering occurs from August to January and the fruit is a hairy nut, fused with others in an elliptical to spherical head up to 22 mm (0.87 in) in diameter.

== Taxonomy ==
Isopogon baxteri was first formally described in 1830 by Robert Brown in the Supplementum to his Prodromus Florae Novae Hollandiae et Insulae Van Diemen from specimens collected in 1823 near the King George's Sound, by William Baxter.

== Distribution and habitat ==
This isopogon grows in heath or shrubland in the Stirling Range and near Mount Barker in the south-west of Western Australia.

== Conservation status ==
Isopogon baxteri is classified as "not threatened" by the Government of Western Australia Department of Parks and Wildlife.
