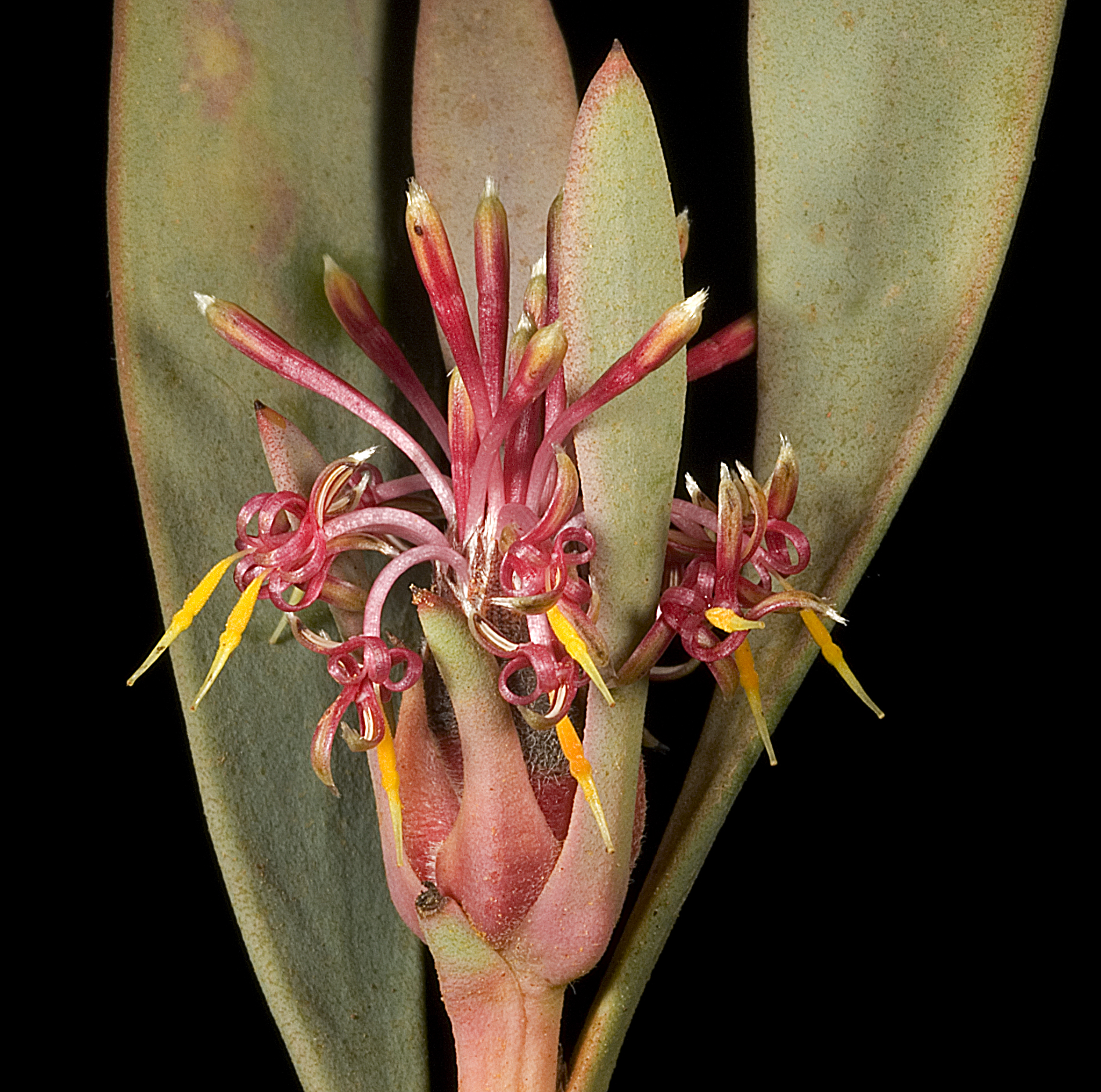
- Isopogon pruinosus subsp. glabellus

Scientific classification
- Kingdom: Plantae
- Clade: Tracheophytes
- Clade: Angiosperms
- Clade: Eudicots
- Order: Proteales
- Family: Proteaceae
- Genus: Isopogon
- Species: I. pruinosus

Binomial name
- Isopogon pruinosus Hislop & Rye
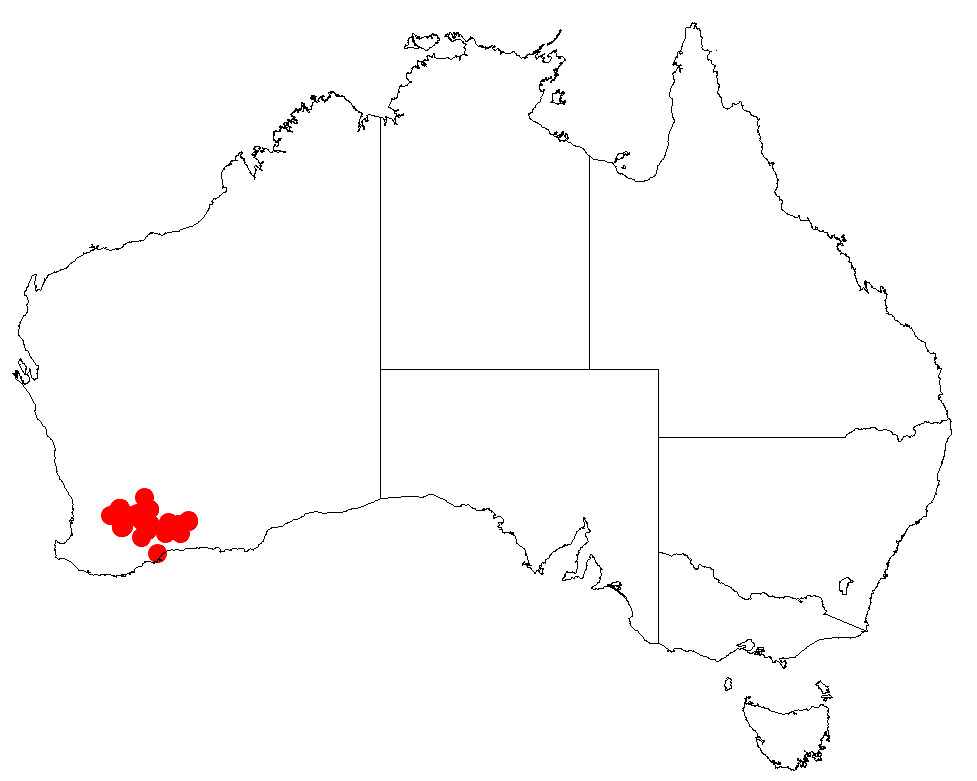
- Occurrence data from Australasian Virtual Herbarium

Synonyms
- Isopogon sp. 'Watheroo' (D.Foreman 477) auct. non WA Herbarium

= Isopogon pruinosus =

Species of shrub endemic to Western Australia

Isopogon pruinosus is a species of flowering plant in the family Proteaceae and is endemic to southwestern Western Australia. It is a compact, spreading shrub with narrow egg-shaped leaves with the narrower end towards the base and spherical to elliptic heads of pink flowers.

== Description ==
Isopogon pruinosus is a shrub that typically grows to about 2 m (6 ft 7 in) high and wide, with more or less glabrous, brownish branchlets. The leaves are glaucous, arranged alternately along the branchlets, and have smooth edges. The leaves are narrow egg-shaped with the narrower end towards the base, 30–85 mm (1.2–3.3 in) long and 6–20 mm (0.24–0.79 in) wide, tapering to a petiole that expands towards its base. The flowers are arranged in sessile, spherical to elliptic heads of sixteen to thirty-two flowers, the heads 15–25 mm (0.59–0.98 in) in diameter with three to four whorls of broadly egg-shaped involucral bracts at the base. The flowers are red or pink and hairy, the hairs pressed against the surface. The fruit is a hairy nut about 3.5 mm (0.14 in) long, fused with others in a spherical head 8–12 mm (0.31–0.47 in) long in diameter.

== Taxonomy ==
Isopogon pruinosus was first formally described in 2010 by the botanists Michael Hislop and Barbara Rye in the journal Nuytsia. In the same journal, Hislop and Rye described two subspecies and the names are accepted at the Australian Plant Census.

- Isopogon pruinosus subsp. glabellus Hislop & Rye has leaves 30–45 mm (1.2–1.8 in) long and 6–10 mm (0.24–0.39 in) wide, widest above the middle or much the same width throughout. The flowers are 11–15 mm (0.43–0.59 in) long and appear in May, June or September. This subspecies mainly differs from the autonym in having involucral bract that are glabrous, or almost so.
- Isopogon pruinosus Hislop & Rye subsp. pruinosus has leaves 25–85 mm (0.98–3.35 in) long and 4–17 mm (0.16–0.67 in) wide, widest above the middle. The flowers are 15–21 mm (0.59–0.83 in) long and appear in May, July, August or September. This subspecies has densely hairy involucral bracts.

The specific epithet (pruinosus) means "frosted or covered with hoar frost", and refers to the white coating that is usually present on this species. The subspecies epithet glabellus means "without hairs" and refers to the almost glabrous involucral bracts of that subspecies.

== Distribution and habitat ==
Both subspecies of Isopogon pruinosus grow in heath or mallee woodland in the Avon Wheatbelt, Esperance Plains and Mallee biogeographic regions. Subspecies glabellus occurs from Corrigin to north of Hyden and subspecies pruinosus from south-west of Hyden to Frank Hann National Park with a disjunct population in the Fitzgerald River National Park.

== Conservation status ==
Both subspecies of I. pruinosus are classified as "not threatened" by the Western Australian Government Department of Parks and Wildlife.
