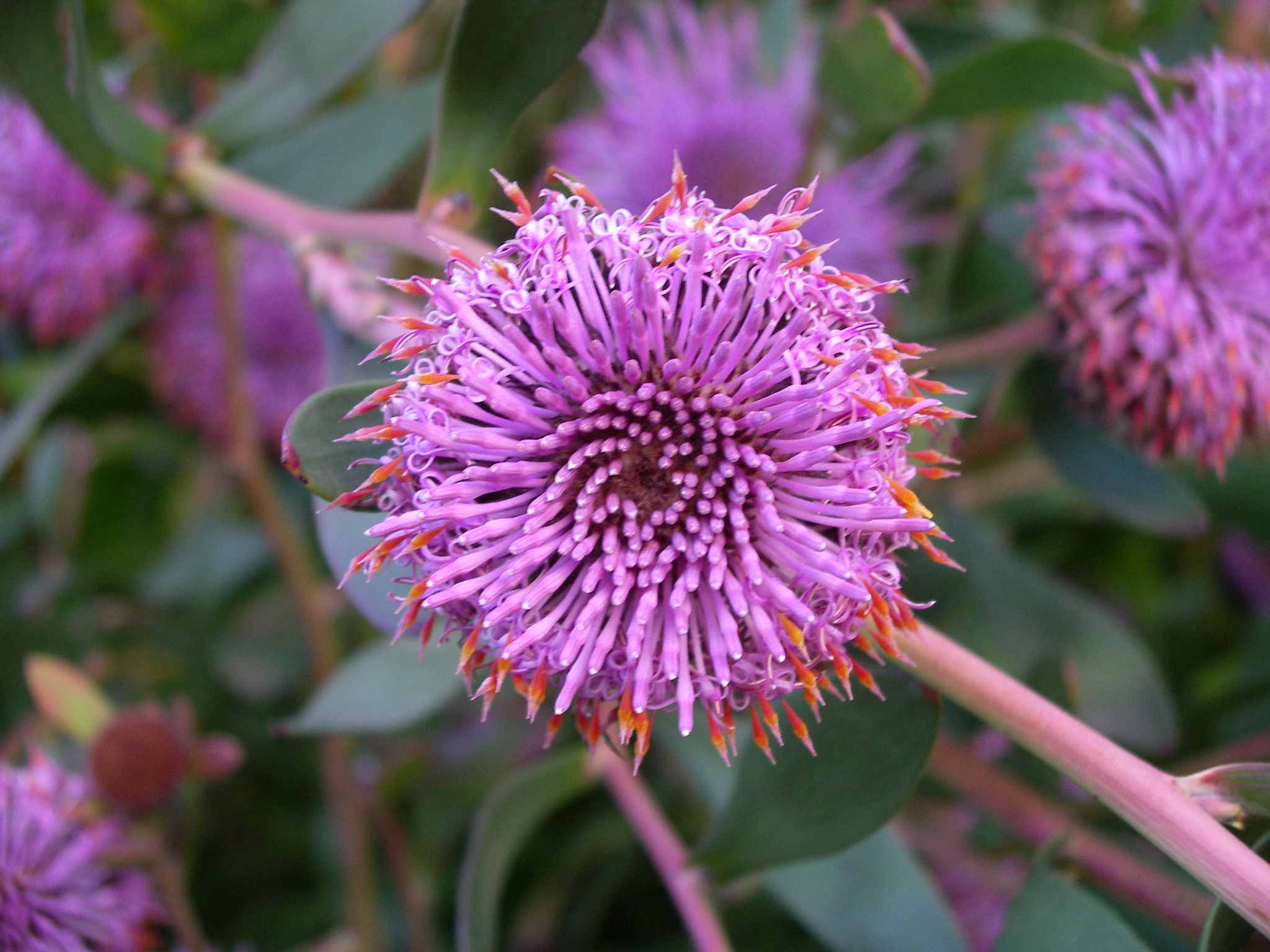
- Isopogon cuneatus

Scientific classification
- Kingdom: Plantae
- Clade: Tracheophytes
- Clade: Angiosperms
- Clade: Eudicots
- Order: Proteales
- Family: Proteaceae
- Subfamily: Proteoideae
- Tribe: Leucadendreae
- Subtribe: Isopogoninae
- Genus: Isopogon; R.Br. ex Knight

Type species
- Isopogon anemonifolius

Species
- 39 species (see text)
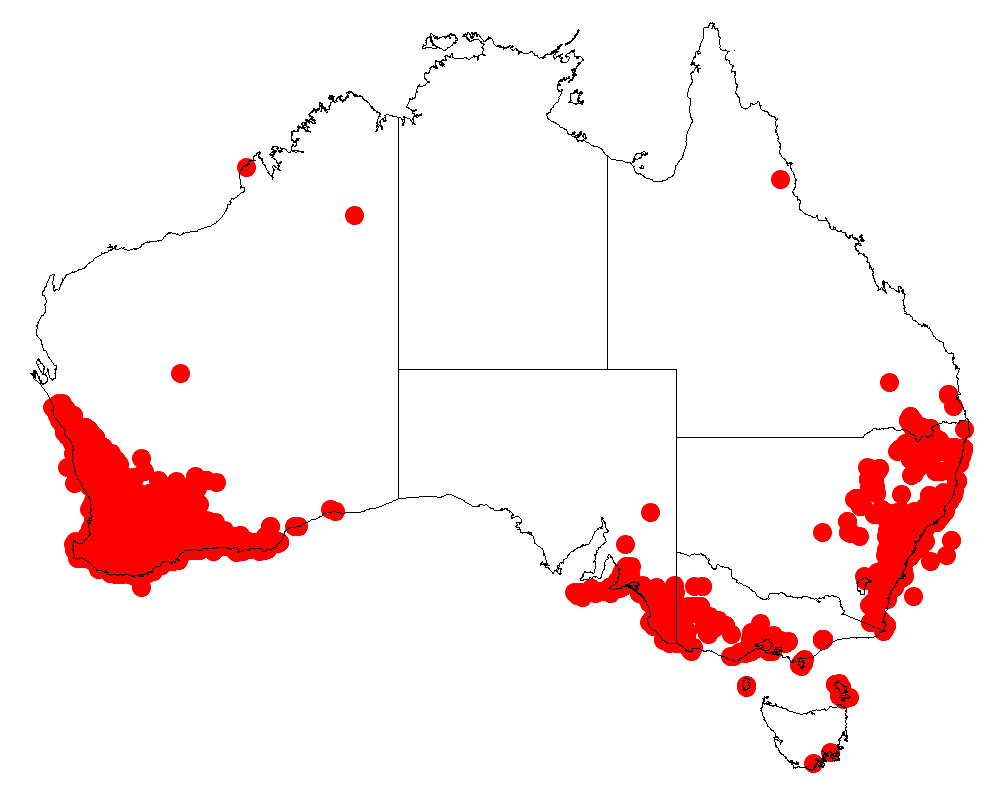
- Occurrence data from Australasian Virtual Herbarium

= Isopogon =

Genus of flowering plants

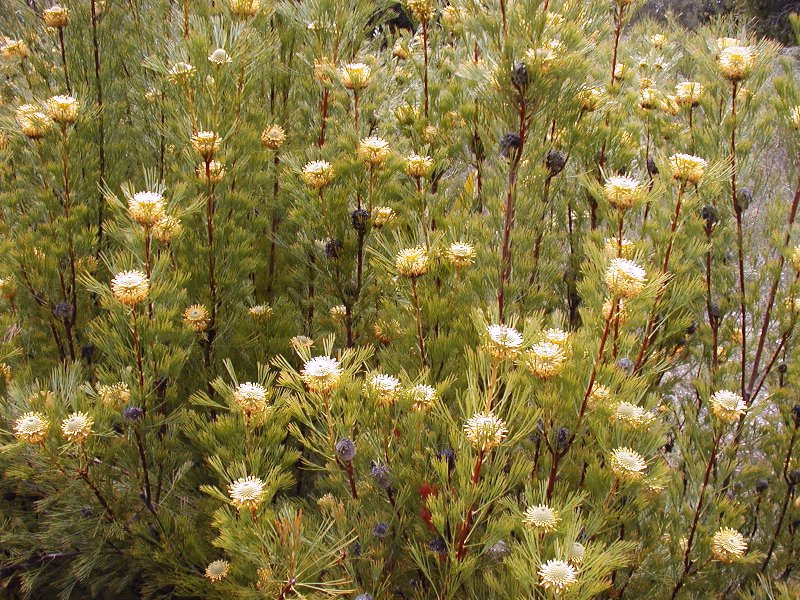
Isopogon anethifolius, Maranoa Gardens

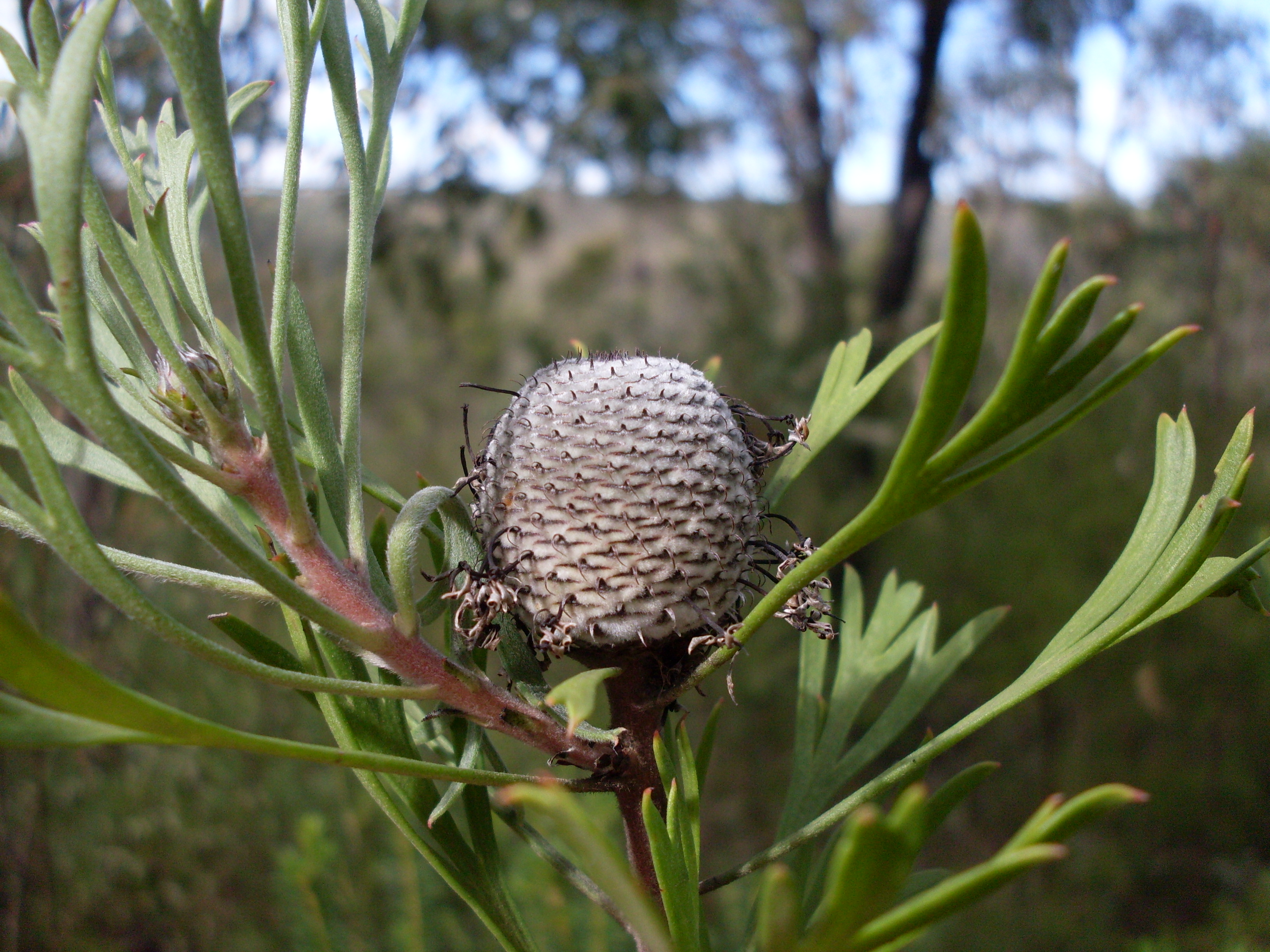
Infructescence of Isopogon anemonifolius

Isopogon, commonly known as conesticks, conebushes or coneflowers, is a genus of about forty species of flowering plants in the family Proteaceae, and are endemic to Australia. They are shrubs with rigid leaves, bisexual flowers in a dense spike or "cone" and the fruit is a small, hairy nut.

== Description ==
Plants in the genus Isopogon are erect or prostrate shrubs with rigid, usually compound, rarely simple leaves. Compound leaves are deeply divided with flat or cylindrical lobes. The flowers are usually arranged on the ends of branches, usually surrounded by bracts, in a more or less conical or spherical spike. Each flower is bisexual and symmetrical, the tepals spreading as the flower develops, the lower part persisting until the fruit expands. The fruit are fused to form a woody cone-like to more or less spherical structure, each fruit a nut with bracts that eventually fall and release the fruit. Isopogon have 13 haploid chromosomes.

== Taxonomy ==
The genus Isopogon was first formally described in 1809 by Joseph Knight in On the cultivation of the plants belonging to the natural order of Proteeae, preempting publication of the same name by Robert Brown in his book On the natural order of plants called Proteaceae.

=== Species list ===
The following is a list of species, subspecies and varieties of Isopogon accepted by the Australian Plant Census as at November 2020:

- Isopogon adenanthoides Meisn. (W.A.) - spider coneflower
- Isopogon alcicornis Diels (W.A.) - elkhorn coneflower
- Isopogon anemonifolius (Salisb.) Knight (N.S.W.) - broad-leaved drumsticks
- Isopogon anethifolius (Salisb.) Knight (N.S.W.) - narrow-leaved drumsticks
- Isopogon asper R.Br. (W.A.)
- Isopogon attenuatus R.Br. (W.A.)
- Isopogon axillaris R.Br. (W.A.)
- Isopogon baxteri R.Br. (W.A.) - Stirling Range coneflower
- Isopogon buxifolius R.Br. (W.A.)
  - Isopogon buxifolius R.Br. var. buxifolius
  - Isopogon buxifolius var. obovatus (R.Br.)Benth.
- Isopogon ceratophyllus R.Br. (S.A., Vic., Tas.) - wild Irishman, horny cone bush
- Isopogon crithmifolius F.Muell. (W.A.)
- Isopogon cuneatus R.Br. (W.A.) - coneflower
- Isopogon dawsonii F.Muell. ex R.T.Baker (N.S.W.) - Nepean cone bush
- Isopogon divergens R.Br. (W.A.) - spreading coneflower
- Isopogon drummondii Hügel ex Jacques (W.A.)
- Isopogon dubius (R.Br.) Druce (W.A.) - pincushion coneflower
- Isopogon fletcheri F.Muell. (N.S.W.) - Fletcher's drumsticks
- Isopogon formosus R.Br. (W.A.) - rose coneflower
  - Isopogon formosus subsp. dasylepis (Meisn.) Foreman
  - Isopogon formosus R.Br. subsp. formosus
- Isopogon gardneri Foreman (W.A.)
- Isopogon heterophyllus Meisn. (W.A.)
- Isopogon inconspicuus (Meisn.) Foreman (W.A.)
- Isopogon latifolius R.Br. (W.A.)
- Isopogon linearis Meisn. (W.A.)
- Isopogon longifolius R.Br. (W.A.)
- Isopogon mnoraifolius McGill. (N.S.W.)
- Isopogon panduratus Hislop & Rye (W.A.)
  - Isopogon panduratus subsp. palustris Hislop & Rye
  - Isopogon panduratus Hislop & Rye subsp. panduratus
- Isopogon petiolaris R.Br. (Qld., N.S.W.)
- Isopogon polycephalus R.Br. (W.A.) - clustered coneflower
- Isopogon prostratus McGill. (N.S.W., Vic.) - prostrate cone-bush
- Isopogon pruinosus Hislop & Rye (W.A.)
  - Isopogon pruinosus subsp. glabellus Hislop & Rye
  - Isopogon pruinosus Hislop & Rye subsp. pruinosus
- Isopogon robustus Foreman ex N.Gibson (W.A.)
- Isopogon scabriusculus Meisn. (W.A.)
  - Isopogon scabriusculus subsp. pubifloris Foreman
  - Isopogon scabriusculus Meisn. subsp. scabriusculus
  - Isopogon scabriusculus subsp. stenophyllus Foreman
- Isopogon spathulatus R.Br. (W.A.)
- Isopogon sphaerocephalus Lindl. (W.A.) - drumstick isopogon
- Isopogon teretifolius R.Br. (W.A.) - nodding coneflower
- Isopogon tridens (Meisn.) F.Muell. (W.A.) - three-toothed coneflower
- Isopogon trilobus R.Br. (W.A.) - barrel coneflower
- Isopogon uncinatus R.Br. (W.A.)
- Isopogon villosus Meisn. (W.A.)

Two new species of Isopogon, I. autumnalis (10 December 2019) and I. nutans (5 May 2020) have been described but the names have not been accepted by the Australian Plant Census as at November 2020.
