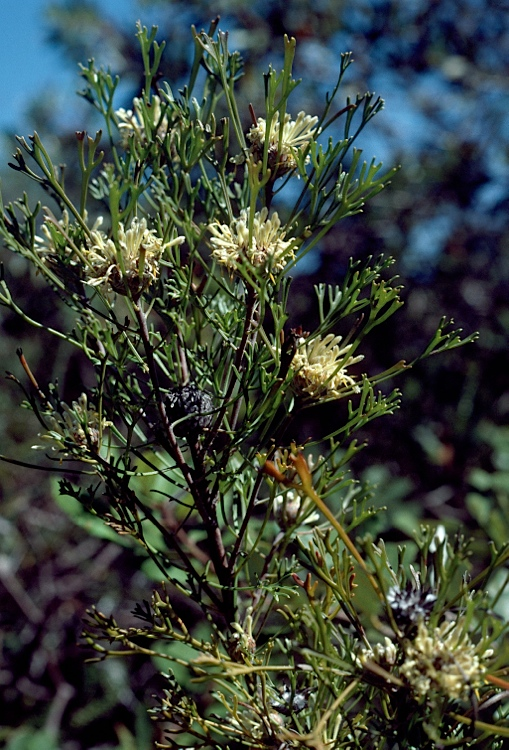
- At Angourie

Scientific classification
- Kingdom: Plantae
- Clade: Tracheophytes
- Clade: Angiosperms
- Clade: Eudicots
- Order: Proteales
- Family: Proteaceae
- Genus: Isopogon
- Species: I. mnoraifolius

Binomial name
- Isopogon mnoraifolius McGill.
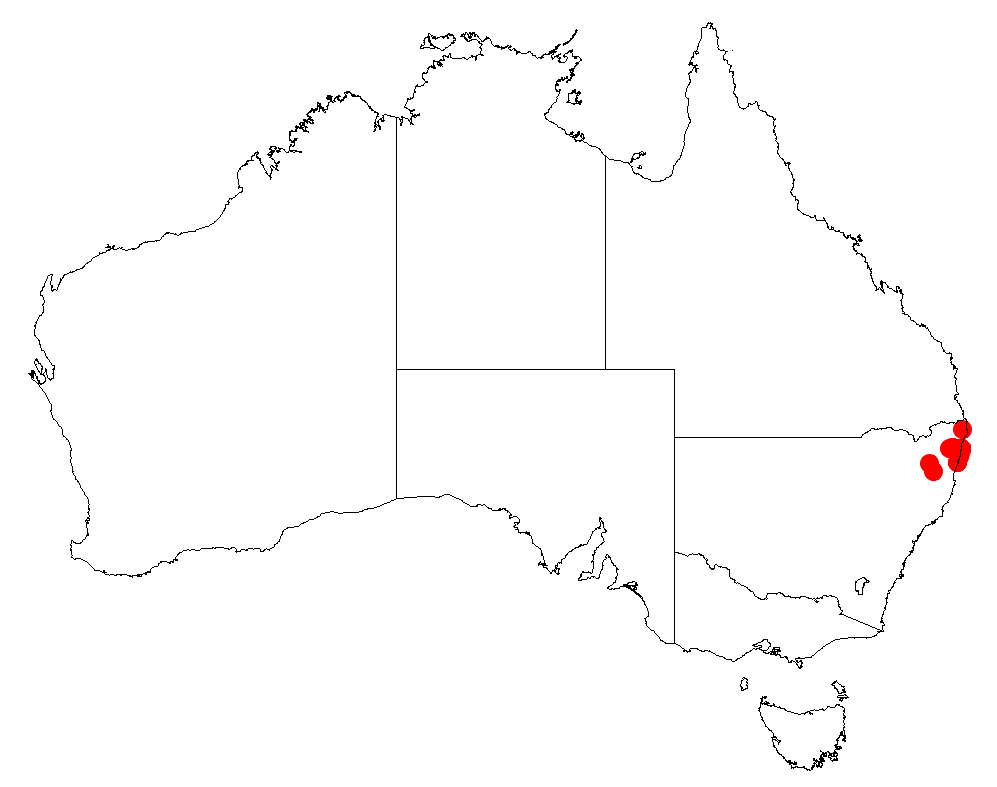
- Occurrence data from Australasian Virtual Herbarium

= Isopogon mnoraifolius =

Species of shrub endemic to Australia

Isopogon mnoraifolius is a shrub in the family Proteaceae and is endemic to New South Wales.

== Description ==
It grows as a 40–80 centimetres (16–31 in) high shrub, with greyish branchlets covered with fine fur. The leaves are generally divided and up to 10 centimetres (3.9 in) long and 3 centimetres (1.2 in) wide. Flowering takes place in September, with the oval or globular flower heads appearing at the ends of stems. They are 3–4 centimetres (1.2–1.6 in) in diameter, with the individual cream-yellow flowers 1.7–2 centimetres (0.67–0.79 in) long. The flowers fall to reveal an oval 2.2 cm diameter cone that bears the seeds. The flowers are partly hairy, which distinguishes the species from I. anemonifolius and I. petiolaris, that both have entirely hairless flowers.

== Taxonomy ==
The species was first formally described by botanist Donald McGillivray in 1975 from material collected by him at Angourie in 1967. The species name is derived from the leaves' resemblance to a menorah. McGillivray noted its existence had been overlooked until 1966 due to its similarity to the widespread Isopogon anemonifolius. He held it to be related to Isopogon dawsonii.

== Distribution and habitat ==
Isopogon mnoraifolius is found only in northeastern New South Wales in the vicinity of Grafton, where it occurs along the coast east from Angourie south to Minnie Water and the Coaldale district. It is found on clay or sand soils, in open heathland or on woodland margins. Its habitat is threatened by development.

== Cultivation ==
Isopogon mnoraifolius has horticultural potential as a rockery plant or pot plant, although it flowers less than other isopogons. Good drainage is needed. It can be propagated readily by cuttings.
