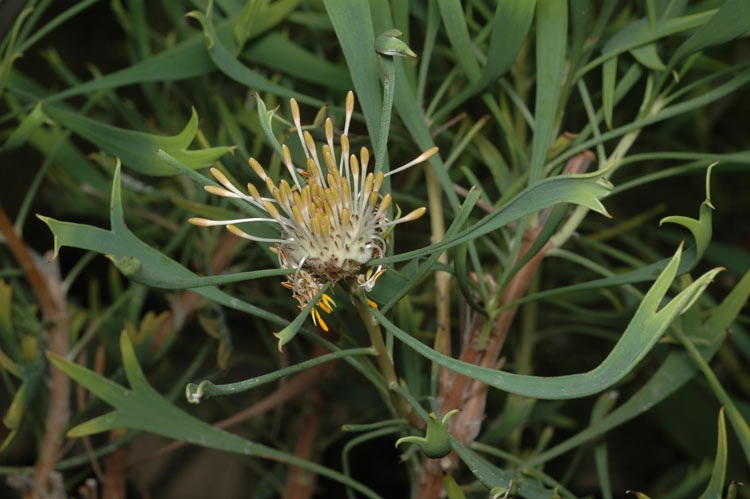
- Isopogon tridens in the ANBG

Scientific classification
- Kingdom: Plantae
- Clade: Tracheophytes
- Clade: Angiosperms
- Clade: Eudicots
- Order: Proteales
- Family: Proteaceae
- Genus: Isopogon
- Species: I. tridens

Binomial name
- Isopogon tridens (Meisn.) F.Muell.

Synonyms
- Atylus tridens (Meisn.) Kuntze; Isopogon trilobus var. tridens Meisn.

= Isopogon tridens =

Three-toothed coneflower

Species of shrub endemic to Western Australia

Isopogon tridens, commonly known as the three-toothed coneflower, is a species of flowering plant in the family Proteaceae and is endemic to the southwest of Western Australia. It is a shrub with wedge-shaped leaves with two or three sharply-pointed teeth, and flattened-spherical heads of glabrous creamy white, sometimes purple flowers.

== Description ==
Isopogon tridens is a shrub that typically grows to a height of 1–1.5 m (3 ft 3 in – 4 ft 11 in) and has hairy, pale reddish to greyish-brown branchlets. The leaves are wedge-shaped, 35–85 mm (1.4–3.3 in) long, with two or three sharply-pointed lobes or teeth near the tip. The flowers are arranged on the ends of branchlets in sessile, flattened-spherical heads 20–30 mm (0.79–1.18 in) in diameter with hairy, broadly egg-shaped involucral bracts at the base. The flowers are more or less glabrous, creamy white or rarely deep purple, and 22–28 mm (0.87–1.10 in) long. Flowering occurs from June to July and the fruit is a hairy nut, fused with others in a flattened-spherical head about 20 mm (0.79 in) in diameter.

== Taxonomy ==
Three-toothed coneflower was first formally described in 1855 by Carl Meissner who gave it the name Isopogon trilobus var. tridens in Hooker's Journal of Botany and Kew Garden Miscellany from specimens collected by James Drummond. In 1868, Ferdinand von Mueller changed the name to Isopogon tridens in Fragmenta phytographiae Australiae.

== Distribution and habitat ==
Isopogon tridens usually grows in shrubland or heath and in a small area from near the Arrowsmith River to Eneabba in the Geraldton Sandplains biogeographic region in the south-west of Western Australia.

== Conservation status ==
This isopogon is classified as "not threatened" by the Government of Western Australia Department of Parks and Wildlife.
