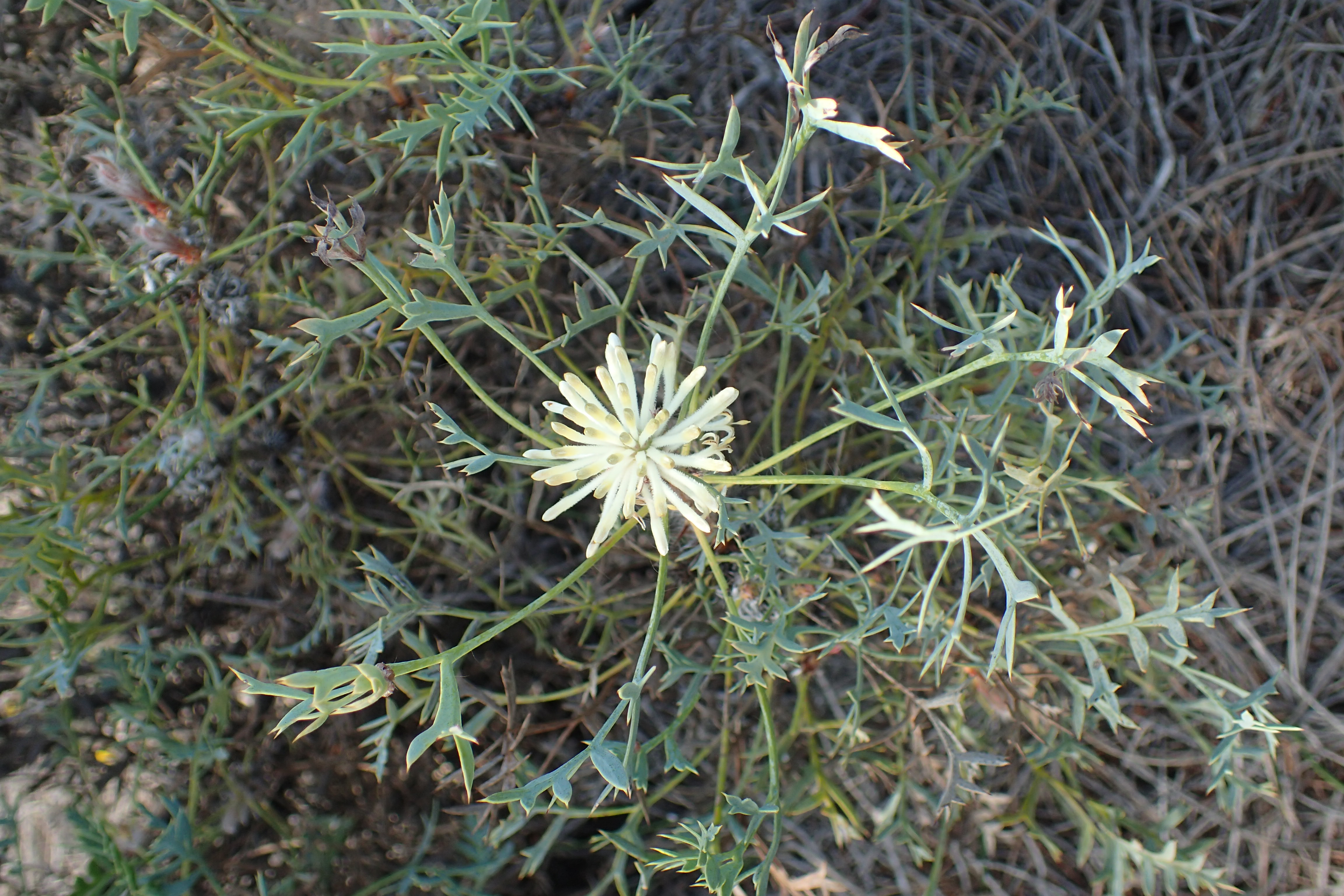

Scientific classification
- Kingdom: Plantae
- Clade: Tracheophytes
- Clade: Angiosperms
- Clade: Eudicots
- Order: Proteales
- Family: Proteaceae
- Genus: Isopogon
- Species: I. villosus

Binomial name
- Isopogon villosus Meisn.

Synonyms
- Atylus villosus (Meisn.) Kuntze; Isopogon villosus Meisn. nom. inval., nom. nud.

= Isopogon villosus =

Species of shrub endemic to Western Australia

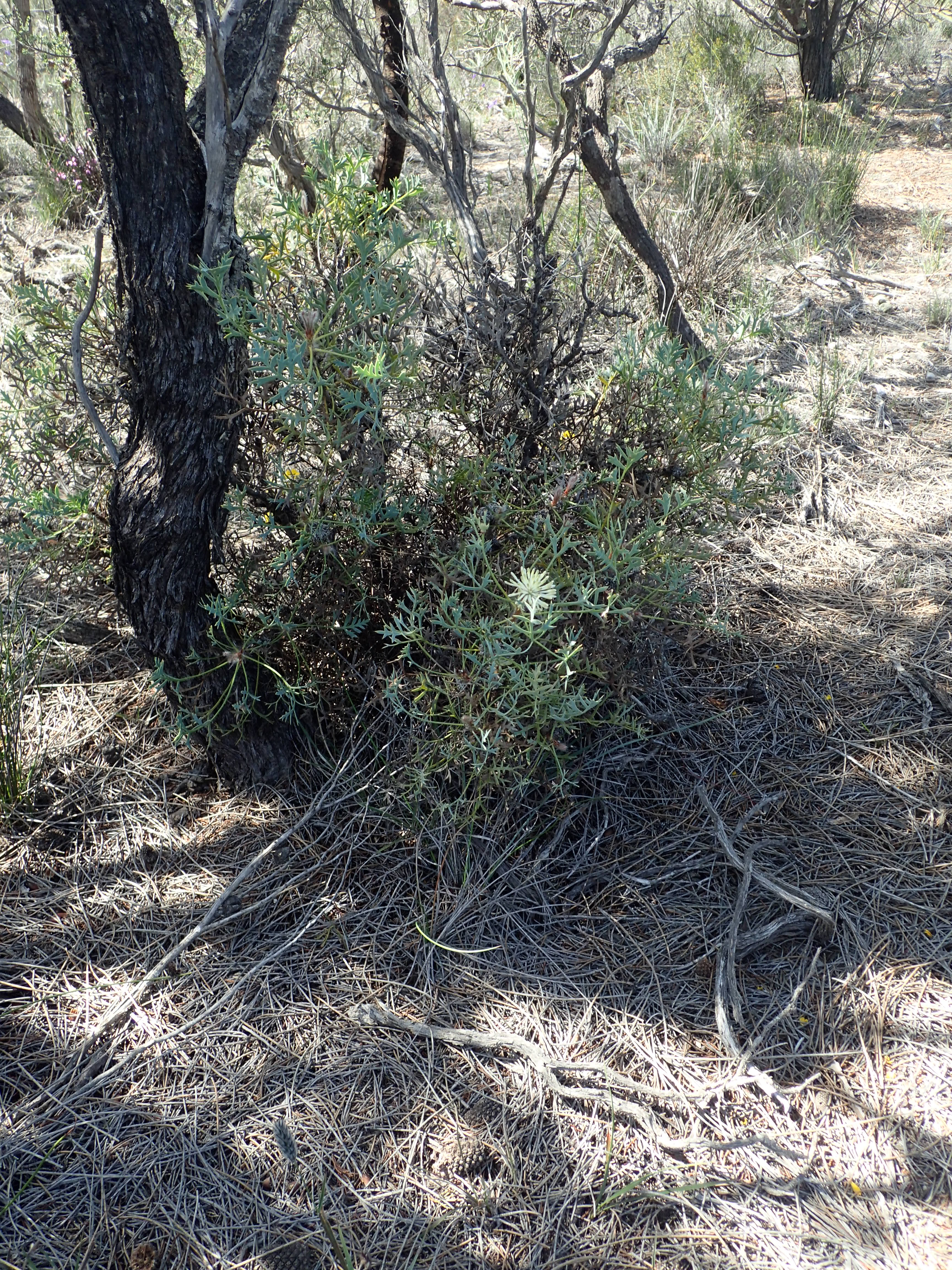
Habit east of Newdegate

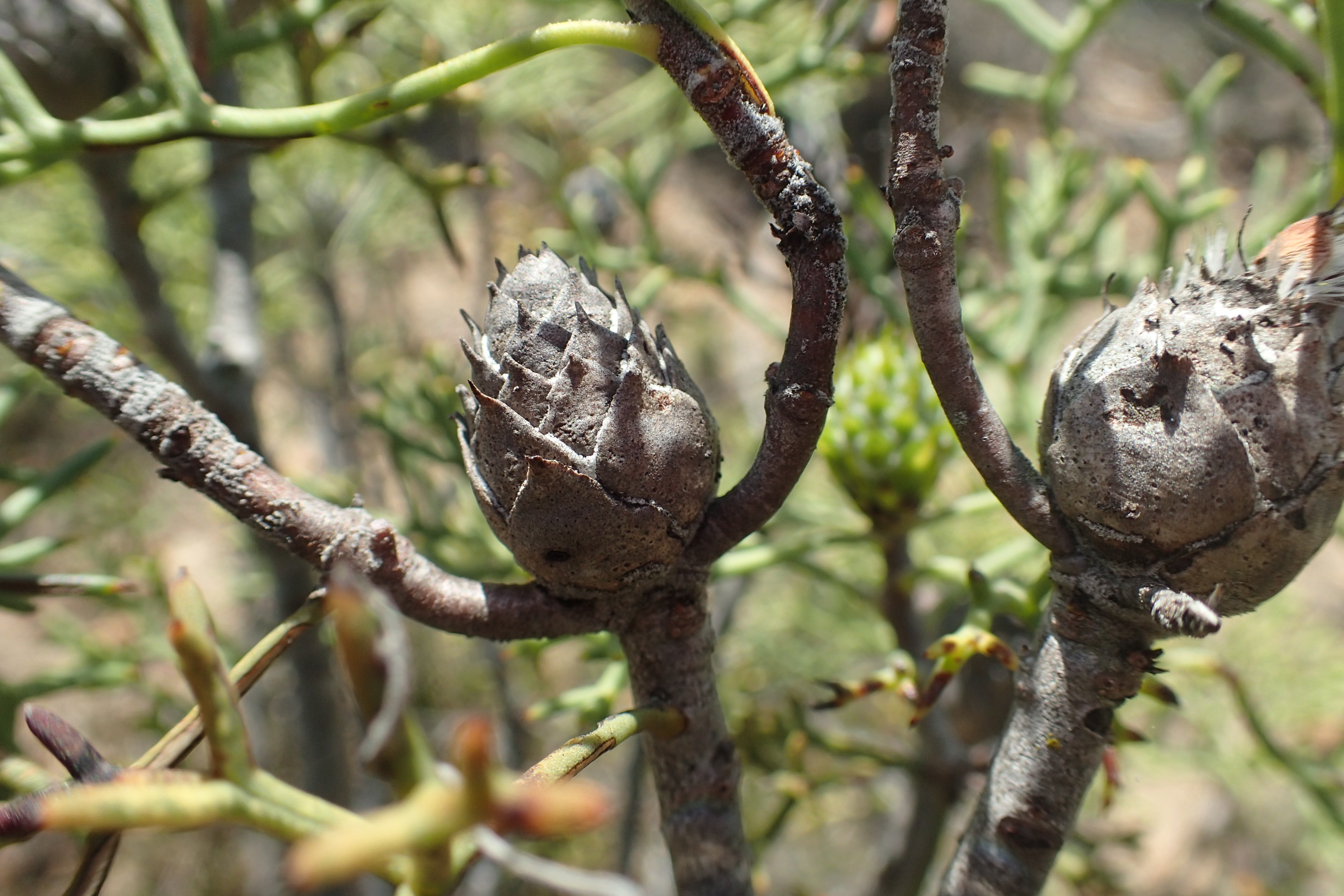
Fruit

Isopogon villosus is a species of flowering plant in the family Proteaceae and is endemic to southwestern Western Australia. It is a tufted shrub with cylindrical leaves with twenty-five to thirty-two widely diverging lobes, and oval heads of cream-coloured to yellow flowers.

== Description ==
Isopogon villosus is a tufted shrub that typically grows to a height of 0.5–1 m (1 ft 8 in – 3 ft 3 in) and has densely hairy, reddish to dark brown branchlets. The leaves are 90–180 mm (3.5–7.1 in) long with 25–32 widely diverging pinnate lobes, the lowest lobe 45–70 mm (1.8–2.8 in) from the base of the leaf. The flowers are arranged in sessile, oval heads about 30 mm (1.2 in) in diameter, often clustered near the base of the plant with hairy, pointed involucral bracts at the base but that fall as the flowers develop. The flowers are up to 15–20 mm (0.59–0.79 in) long, cream-coloured to yellow, and densely hairy. Flowering occurs from September to November and the fruit is a hairy nut, fused with others in an oval head 20–25 mm (0.79–0.98 in) in diameter.

== Taxonomy ==
Isopogon villosus was first formally described in 1856 by Carl Meissner in de Candolle's Prodromus Systematis Naturalis Regni Vegetabilis. (Meissner had previously published the name Isopogon villosus in 1852 but without a description.)

== Distribution and habitat ==
This isopogon grows in heath and shrubland in scattered populations between Pingelly and Lake King in the Avon Wheatbelt, Esperance Plains and Mallee biogeographic regions.

== Conservation status ==
Isopogon villosus is classified as "not threatened" by the Western Australian Government Department of Parks and Wildlife.
