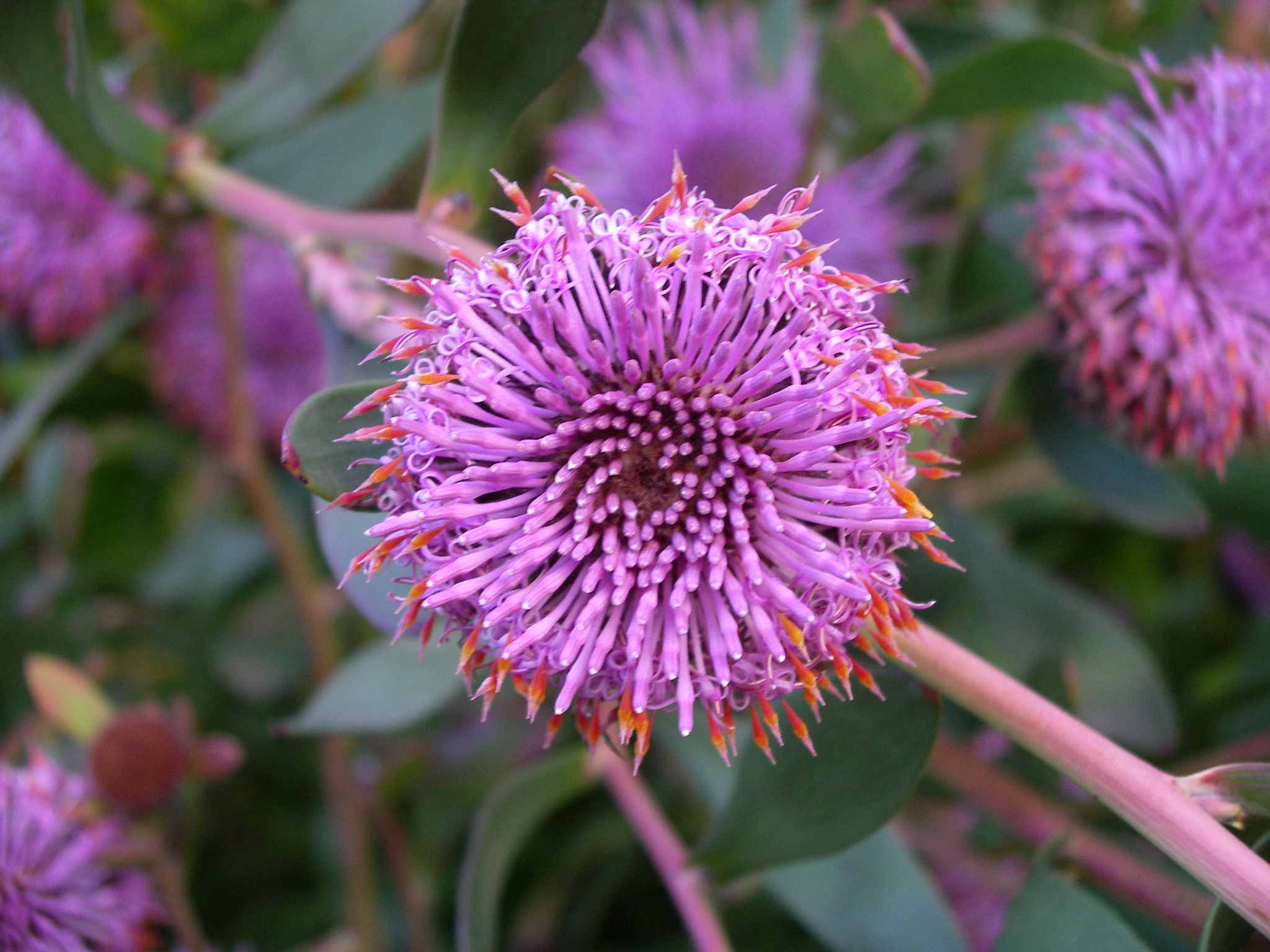

Scientific classification
- Kingdom: Plantae
- Clade: Tracheophytes
- Clade: Angiosperms
- Clade: Eudicots
- Order: Proteales
- Family: Proteaceae
- Genus: Isopogon
- Species: I. cuneatus

Binomial name
- Isopogon cuneatus R.Br.
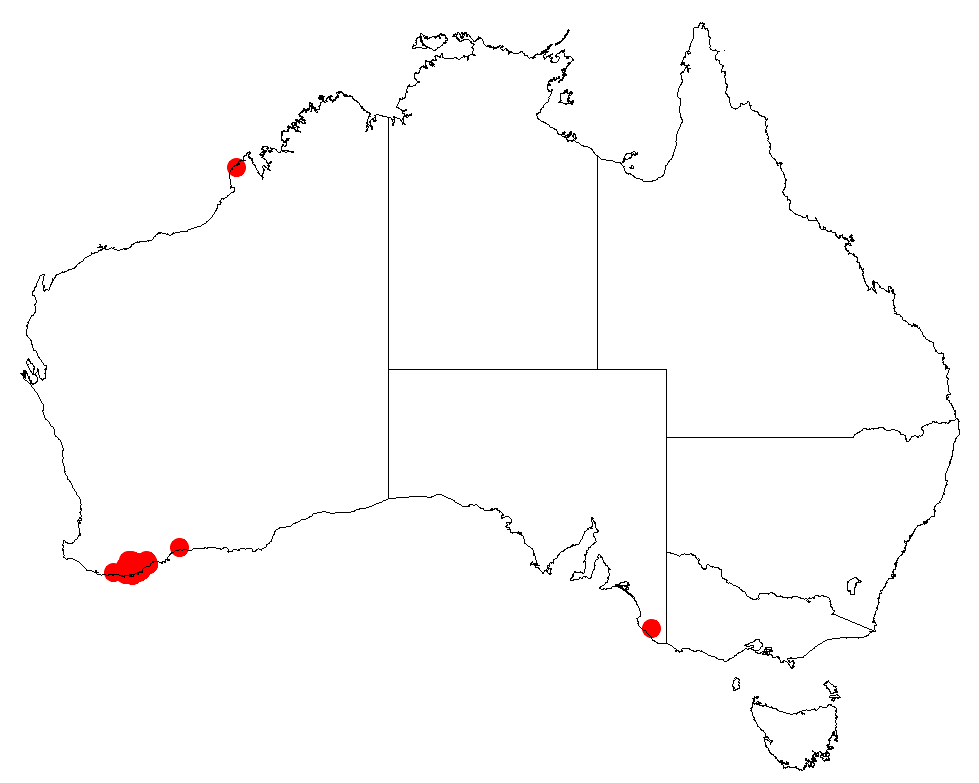
- Occurrence data from Australasian Virtual Herbarium

Synonyms
- Atylus cuneatus (R.Br.) Kuntze; Isopogon lanceolatus (Meisn.) B.D.Jacks.; Isopogon latifolius var. lanceolatus Meisn.; Isopogon latifolius var. preissii Meisn.; Isopogon loudonii R.Br.

= Isopogon cuneatus =

Species of shrub endemic to Western Australia

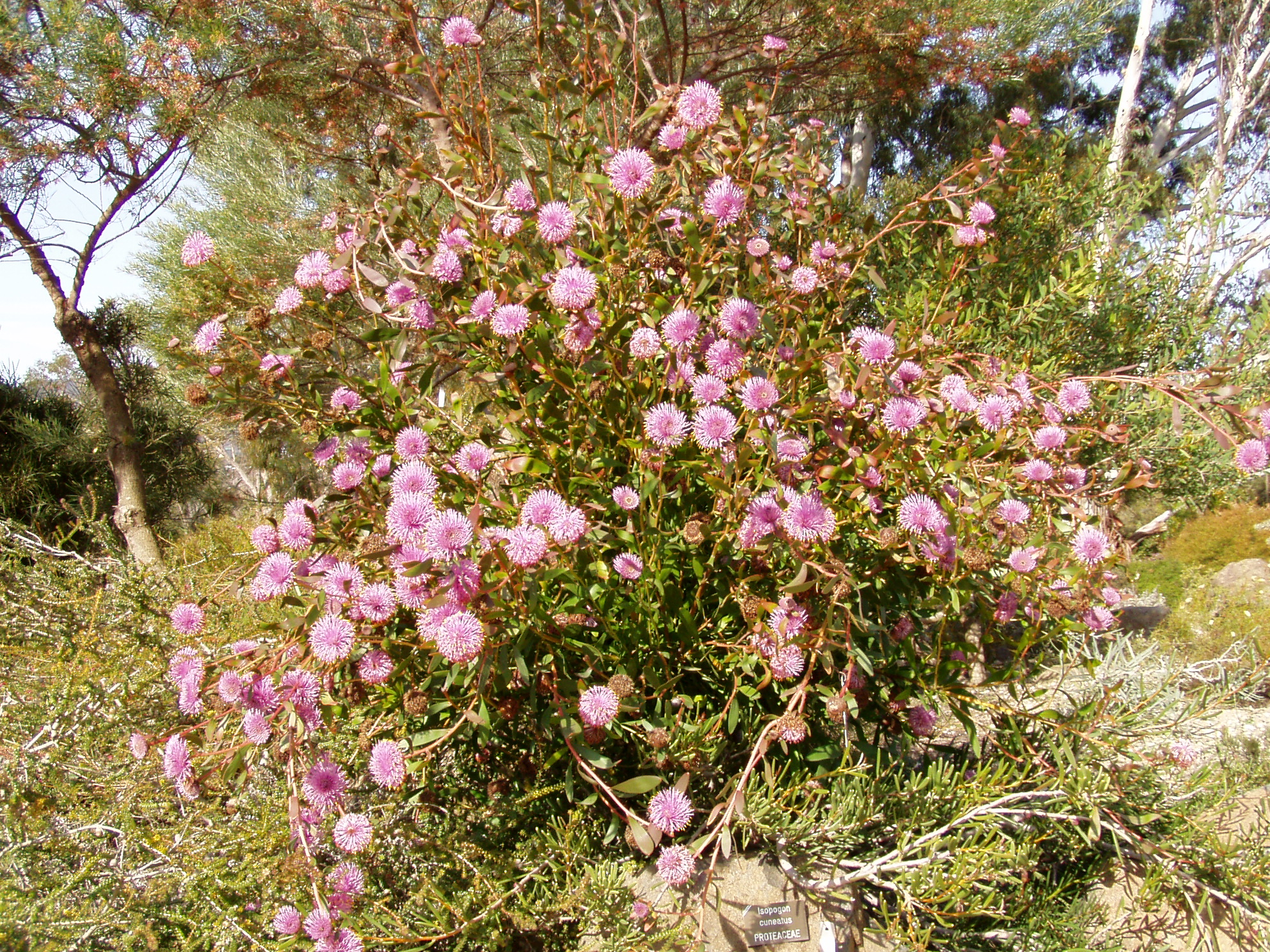
Habit

Isopogon cuneatus, commonly known as coneflower, is a species of plant in the family Proteaceae and is endemic to the south-west of Western Australia. It is a shrub with oblong to egg-shaped leaves with the narrower end towards the base, and flattened-spherical heads of glabrous pale to purplish pink flowers.

== Description ==
Isopogon cuneatus is a shrub that typically grows to a height of 1.5–2.5 m (4 ft 11 in – 8 ft 2 in) and has hairy pale to reddish brown branchlets. The leaves are oblong to egg-shaped with the narrower end towards the base, 40–100 mm (1.6–3.9 in) long and 10–30 mm (0.39–1.18 in) wide. The flowers are arranged in conspicuous, flattened-spherical, sessile heads on the ends of branchlets, 40–55 mm (1.6–2.2 in) long in diameter with broadly egg-shaped involucral bracts at the base. The flowers are about 25 mm (0.98 in) long, pale to purplish pink and glabrous. Flowering occurs from July to October and the fruit is a hairy oval nut, fused with others in a hemispherical cone up to 35 mm (1.4 in) in diameter.

== Taxonomy ==
Isopogon cuneatus was first formally described in 1810 by Robert Brown in the Transactions of the Linnean Society of London.

== Distribution and habitat ==
Coneflower grows in heath, shrubland and low woodland on stony hills and swampy flats between Albany, the Stirling Range and Cheyne Bay in the Esperance Plains, Jarrah Forest and Warren biogeographic regions.
