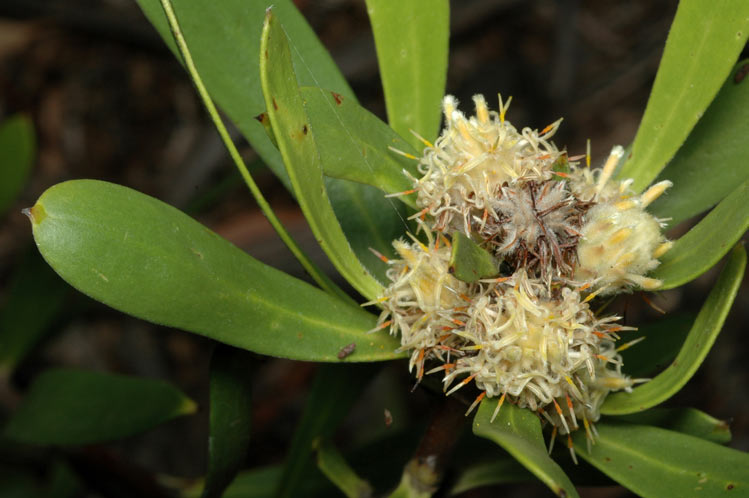
- In the Australian National Botanic Gardens

Scientific classification
- Kingdom: Plantae
- Clade: Tracheophytes
- Clade: Angiosperms
- Clade: Eudicots
- Order: Proteales
- Family: Proteaceae
- Genus: Isopogon
- Species: I. attenuatus

Binomial name
- Isopogon attenuatus R.Br.
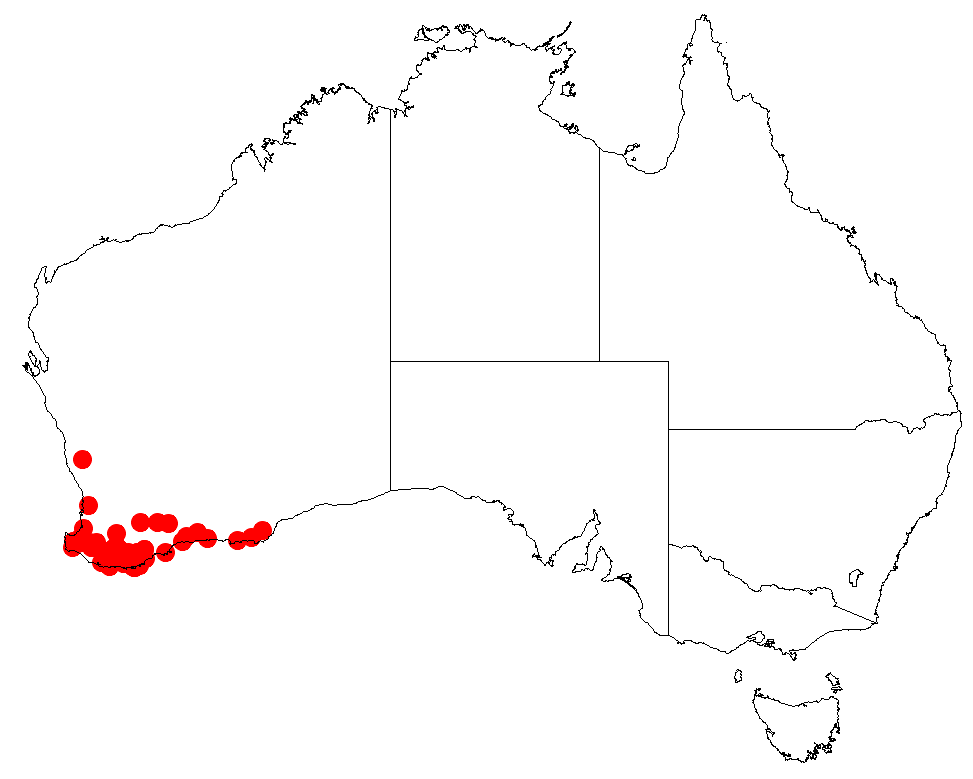
- Occurrence data from Australasian Virtual Herbarium

Synonyms
- Atylus attenuatus (R.Br.) Kuntze; Isopogon attenuatus var. angustatus Meisn.; Isopogon attenuatus R.Br. var. attenuatus; Isopogon attenuatus var. dilatatus Meisn.; Isopogon attenuatus var. latebracteata Benth.

= Isopogon attenuatus =

Species of shrub endemic to Western Australia

Isopogon attenuatus is a species of plant in the family Proteaceae and is endemic to the south-west of Western Australia. It is a shrub with oblong to spatula-shaped or linear leaves and spherical heads of yellow flowers.

== Description ==
Isopogon attenuatus is a shrub that typically grows to a height of 0.2–2 m (7.9 in – 6 ft 6.7 in) and has mostly glabrous, brownish branchlets. The leaves are oblong to spatula-shaped or linear, 80–240 mm (3.1–9.4 in) long and 10–20 mm (0.39–0.79 in) wide on a petiole about 50 mm (2.0 in) long, with a sharp point on the tip. The flowers are arranged in sessile, more or less spherical heads 40–50 mm (1.6–2.0 in) in diameter. The involucral bracts are egg-shaped, the flowers 10–15 mm (0.39–0.59 in) long and creamy yellow to pale yellow. Flowering occurs from September to February and the fruit is a hairy nut, fused in a more or less spherical head about 25 mm (0.98 in) in diameter.

== Taxonomy ==
Isopogon attenuatus was first formally described in 1810 by Robert Brown in the Transactions of the Linnean Society of London.

== Distribution and habitat ==
This isopogon grows in woodland with a heathy understorey, in scattered population from near Perth to Albany and Mount Manypeaks, in the south-west of Western Australia.

== Conservation status ==
Isopogon attenuatus is classified as "not threatened" by the Government of Western Australia Department of Parks and Wildlife.
