= Isopogon robustus =

Conservation status
- Critically endangered (EPBC Act)

Scientific classification
- Kingdom: Plantae
- Clade: Tracheophytes
- Clade: Angiosperms
- Clade: Eudicots
- Order: Proteales
- Family: Proteaceae
- Genus: Isopogon
- Species: I. robustus

Binomial name
- Isopogon robustus Foreman ex N.Gibson

Species of shrub endemic to Western Australia

Isopogon robustus, commonly known as robust coneflower, is a plant in the family Proteaceae and is endemic to a restricted area in the southwest of Western Australia. It is a shrub with cylindrical leaves and oval heads of pink flowers.

== Description ==
Isopogon robustus is a shrub that typically grows to about 1.5 m (4 ft 11 in) high and 2 m (6 ft 7 in) wide with brownish branchlets. The leaves are cylindrical, up to 150 mm (5.9 in) long and 2.5–3.3 mm (0.098–0.130 in) wide and more or less sessile. The flowers are arranged in oval, sessile heads of about nineteen to twenty-five pink flowers, the heads about 38 mm (1.5 in) in diameter with egg-shaped involucral bracts at the base. Flowering occurs in October and the fruit is a hairy nut about 3–3.5 mm (0.12–0.14 in) long, fused in a spherical head 9–24 mm (0.35–0.94 in) in diameter.

== Taxonomy and naming ==
Isopogon robustus was first formally described in 2005 by Neil Gibson in the journal Muelleria from a manuscript prepared by Donald Bruce Foreman but not published before his death. The specific epithet (robustus) is a reference to the thick leaves and large flowers of this isopogon.

== Distribution and habitat ==
This isopogon grows on laterite but is only known from a population of about 120 plants in the Parker Range near Southern Cross in the south-west of Western Australia.

== Conservation status ==
Isopogon robustus is listed as "critically endangered" under the Australian Government Environment Protection and Biodiversity Conservation Act 1999 and as "Threatened Flora (Declared Rare Flora — Extant)" by the Department of Environment and Conservation (Western Australia).
