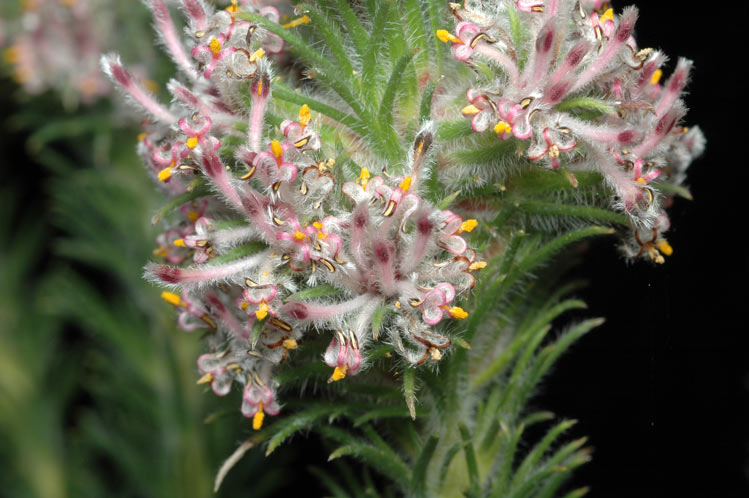
- In the ANBG

Scientific classification
- Kingdom: Plantae
- Clade: Tracheophytes
- Clade: Angiosperms
- Clade: Eudicots
- Order: Proteales
- Family: Proteaceae
- Genus: Isopogon
- Species: I. inconspicuus

Binomial name
- Isopogon inconspicuus (Meisn.) Foreman

Synonyms
- Petrophila inconspicua Meisn. orth. var.; Petrophile inconspicua Meisn. orth. var.

= Isopogon inconspicuus =

Species of shrub

Isopogon inconspicuus is a plant in the family Proteaceae and is endemic to the southwest of Western Australia. It is a small shrub with pinnate leaves with cylindrical leaflets, and pink to purple flowers covered with grey hairs.

== Description ==
Isopogon inconspicuus is a shrub that typically grows to a height of 20–80 cm (7.9–31.5 in), its branchlets covered with woolly, brownish to greyish hairs. The leaves are crowded, 10–12 mm (0.39–0.47 in) long and pinnate with cylindrical leaflets on a petiole up to 2 mm (0.079 in) long. The flowers are arranged in spherical, sessile heads about 25–30 mm (0.98–1.18 in) long, crowded near the ends of branchlets, each head with usually drooping pink to purple flowers about 25 mm (0.98 in) long, and covered with grey hairs. Flowering occurs from August to November and the fruit is a hairy nut up to 3 mm (0.12 in) long, fused in an oval to spherical head 15–20 mm (0.59–0.79 in) in diameter.

== Taxonomy and naming ==
This isopogon was first formally described in 1855 by Carl Meissner in Hooker's Journal of Botany and Kew Garden Miscellany and given the name Petrophile inconspicua from specimens collected by James Drummond. In 1995, Donald Bruce Foreman changed the name to Isopogon inconspicuus in Flora of Australia.

== Distribution and habitat ==
Isopogon inconspicuus grows in heath and shrubland on sandplains between Dandaragan and Eneabba.
