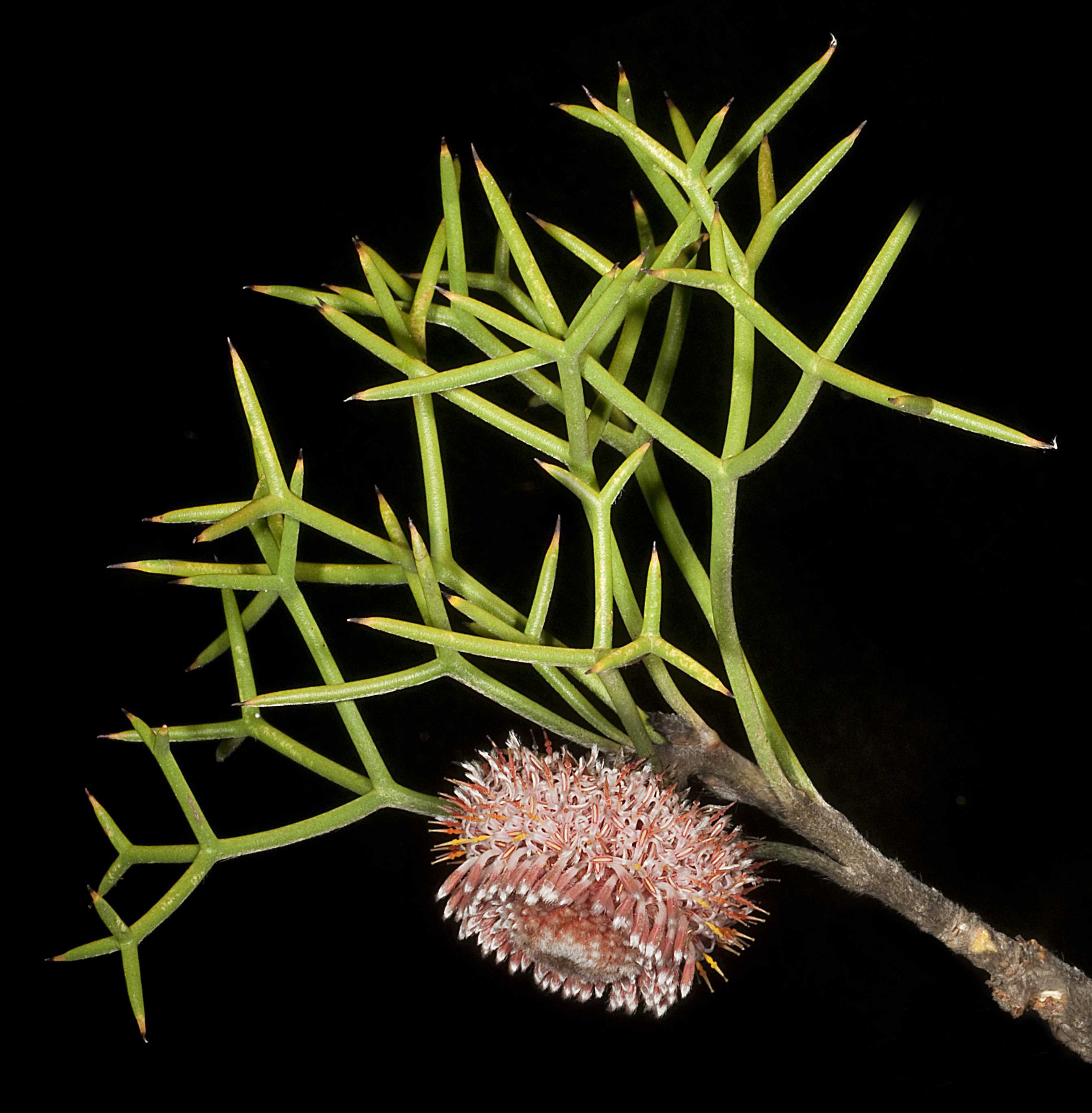

Scientific classification
- Kingdom: Plantae
- Clade: Tracheophytes
- Clade: Angiosperms
- Clade: Eudicots
- Order: Proteales
- Family: Proteaceae
- Genus: Isopogon
- Species: I. teretifolius

Binomial name
- Isopogon teretifolius R.Br.
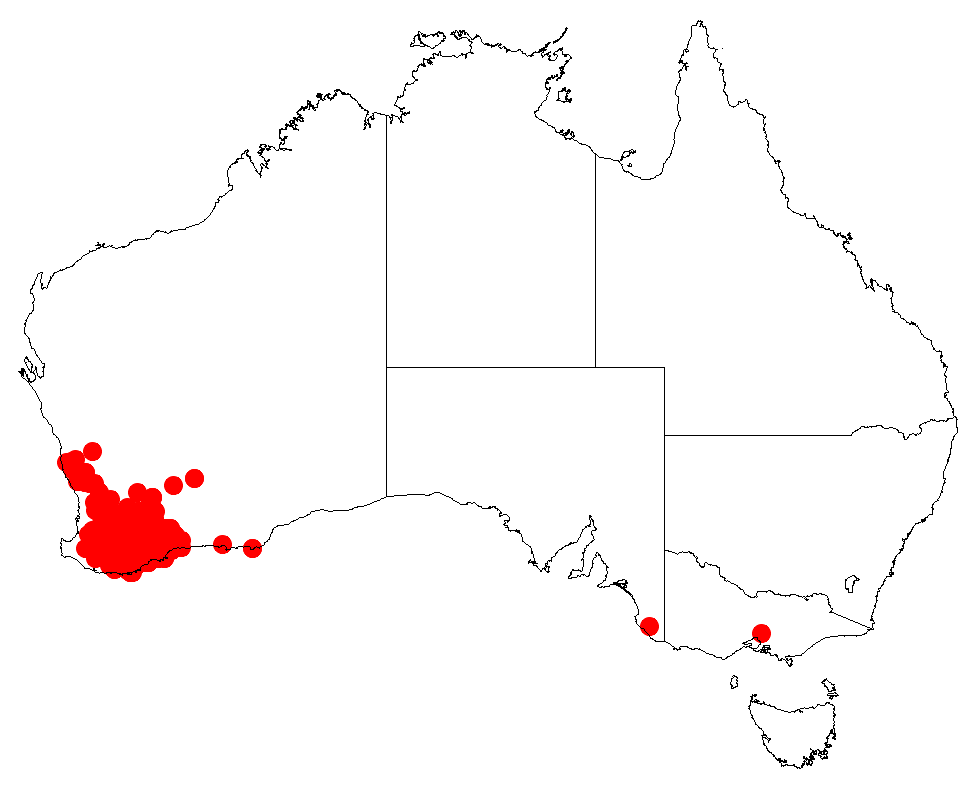
- Occurrence data from Australasian Virtual Herbarium

Synonyms
- List: Atylus teretifolius (R.Br.) Kuntze; Isopogon corniger Lindl.; Isopogon cornigerus Lindl. orth. var.; Isopogon petrophiloides R.Br.; Isopogon teretifolius subsp. petrophiloides (R.Br.) Foreman; Isopogon teretifolius R.Br. subsp. teretifolius; Isopogon teretifolius var. corniger (Lindl.) Meisn.; Isopogon teretifolius var. cornigerus Meisn. orth. var.; Isopogon teretifolius R.Br. var. teretifolius

= Isopogon teretifolius =

Nodding coneflower

Species of shrub endemic to Western Australia

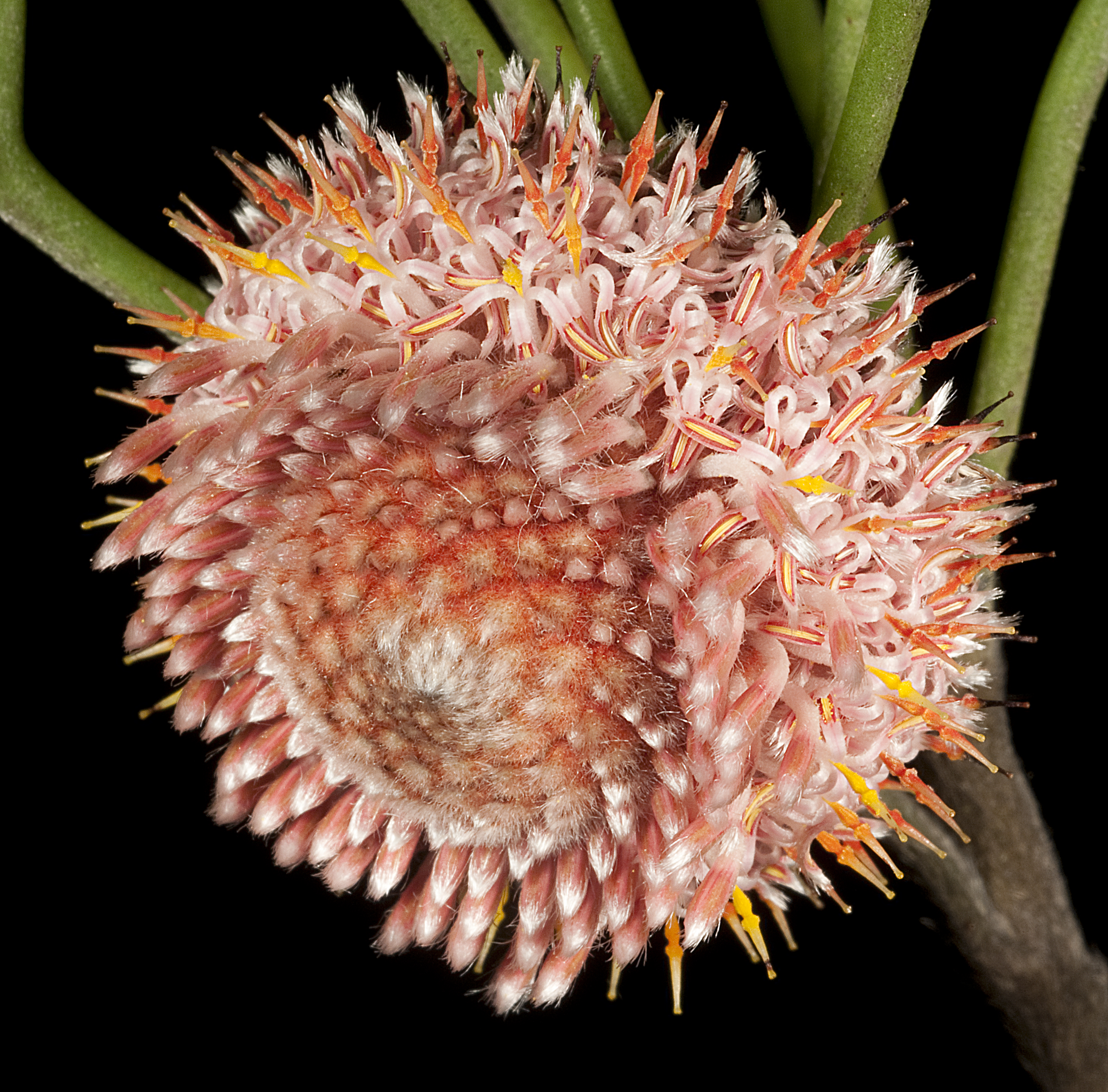
Flower detail

Isopogon teretifolius, commonly known as nodding coneflower, is a species of flowering plant in the family Proteaceae and is endemic to the southwest of Western Australia. It is an erect shrub with cylindrical, sometimes branched leaves, and flattened-spherical heads of hairy pinkish flowers.

== Description ==
Isopogon teretifolius is an erect shrub that typically grows to a height of 0.5–2 m (1 ft 8 in – 6 ft 7 in) and has hairy, pale to greyish-brown branchlets. The leaves are cylindrical, 25–100 mm (0.98–3.94 in) long, sometimes pinnately divided, the leaf and segments 1.5–2 mm (0.059–0.079 in) wide with a sharply-pointed tip. The flowers are arranged on the ends of branchlets in sessile, flattened-spherical, sometimes dropping heads 25–40 mm (0.98–1.57 in) in diameter with hairy, reddish brown, egg-shaped involucral bracts at the base. The flowers are hairy, creamy pink, pale pink or white tinged with pink, and up to 15 mm (0.59 in) long. Flowering occurs from August to November and the fruit is a hairy nut, fused with others in a flattened-spherical to conical head 20–25 mm (0.79–0.98 in) in diameter.

== Taxonomy ==
Isopogon teretifolius was first formally described in 1810 by Robert Brown in Transactions of the Linnean Society of London. The specific epithet (teretifolius) means "terete-leaved".

== Distribution and habitat ==
Nodding coneflower grows in forest, shrubland and heath and is widely distributed in the Avon Wheatbelt, Esperance Plains, Geraldton Sandplains, Jarrah Forest, Mallee and Swan Coastal Plain biogeographic regions in the south-west of Western Australia.

== Conservation status ==
This isopogon is classified as "not threatened" by the Government of Western Australia Department of Parks and Wildlife.
