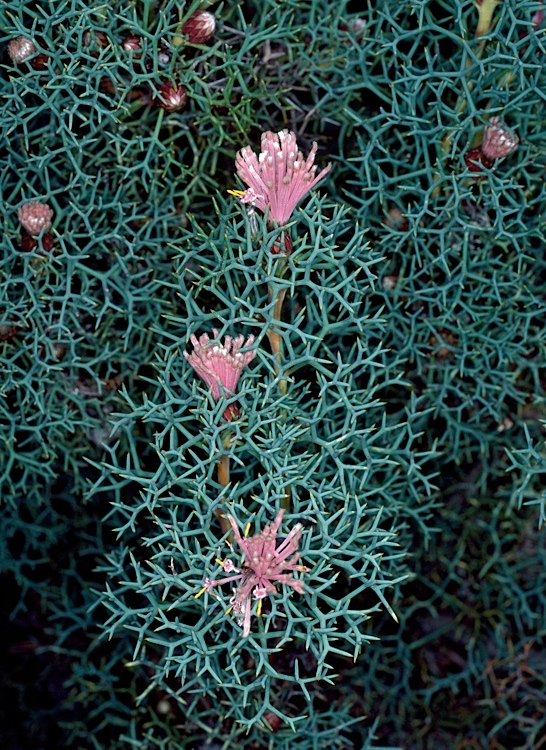
- Near Tarin Rock

Scientific classification
- Kingdom: Plantae
- Clade: Tracheophytes
- Clade: Angiosperms
- Clade: Eudicots
- Order: Proteales
- Family: Proteaceae
- Genus: Isopogon
- Species: I. gardneri

Binomial name
- Isopogon gardneri Foreman

Synonyms
- Dryandra petrophiloides C.A.Gardner

= Isopogon gardneri =

Species of shrub

Isopogon gardneri is a plant in the family Proteaceae and is endemic to the southwest of Western Australia. It is a dense, prickly shrub with sharply-pointed, interlocking leaves and hairy, pale pink or yellow flowers.

== Description ==
Isopogon gardneri is a very prickly, densely-foliaged shrub that typically grows to a height of 0.6–2 m (2 ft 0 in – 6 ft 7 in) with smooth, reddish brown branchlets. The leaves interlock with each other and are pinnate, about 40 mm (1.6 in) long on a petiole up to 25 mm (0.98 in) long, each branch of the leaves with a sharply-pointed tip. The flowers are arranged in sessile heads about 35 mm (1.4 in) long on the ends of branchlets, each head with many pale pink or yellow flowers up to about 30 mm (1.2 in) long, the heads with persistent involucral bracts at the base. Flowering occurs from September to December and the fruit is a hairy nut 3–3.5 mm (0.12–0.14 in) long, fused in a cone-shaped head up to 12 mm (0.47 in) in diameter surrounded by bracts.

== Taxonomy and naming ==
Isopogon gardneri was first formally described in 1995 by Donald Bruce Foreman in Flora of Australia from specimens he collected near Hyden on the road to Newdegate in 1984. The specific epithet (gardneri) honours Charles Gardner.

== Distribution and habitat ==
This isopogon grows in shrubland and mallee between Dundinin, Kukerin, Mount Holland and Hatters Hill in the Avon Wheatbelt, Coolgardie and Mallee biogeographic regions in the south-west of Western Australia.

== Conservation status ==
Isopogon gardneri is classified as "not threatened" by the Western Australian Government Department of Parks and Wildlife.
