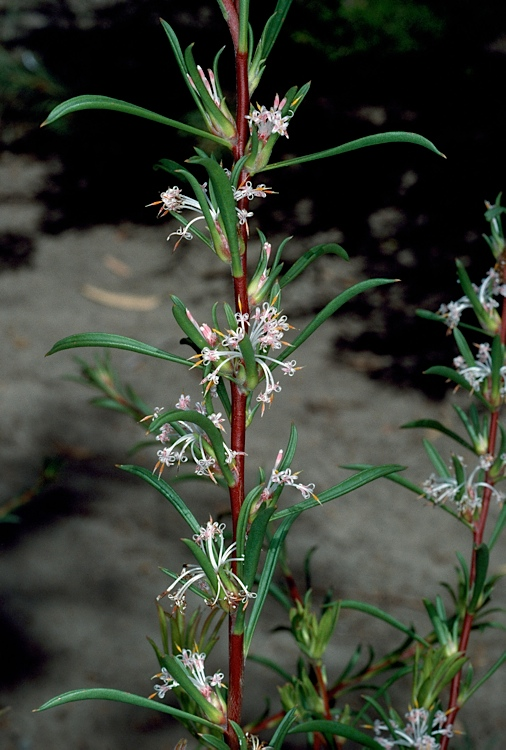
- In Kings Park Botanic Gardens

Scientific classification
- Kingdom: Plantae
- Clade: Tracheophytes
- Clade: Angiosperms
- Clade: Eudicots
- Order: Proteales
- Family: Proteaceae
- Genus: Isopogon
- Species: I. axillaris

Binomial name
- Isopogon axillaris R.Br.
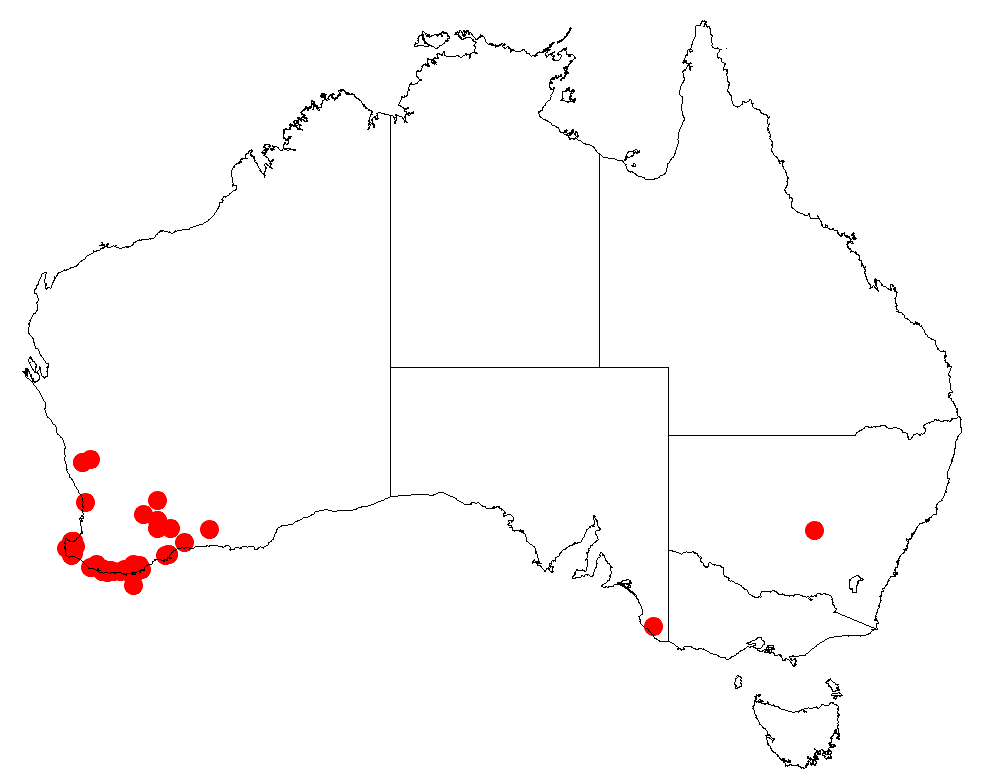
- Occurrence data from Australasian Virtual Herbarium

Synonyms
- Atylus axillaris (R.Br.) Kuntze

= Isopogon axillaris =

Species of shrub endemic to Western Australia

Isopogon axillaris is a species of plant in the family Proteaceae and is endemic to the south-west of Western Australia. It is a shrub with thick, linear to lance-shaped leaves with the narrower end towards the base and oval heads of pink or purple flowers.

== Description ==
Isopogon axillaris is a shrub that typically grows to a height of 0.4–1.2 m (1 ft 4 in – 3 ft 11 in) and has glabrous, brown branchlets. The leaves are linear to lance-shaped with the narrower end towards the base, 15–90 mm (0.59–3.54 in) long, 5–10 mm (0.20–0.39 in) wide and more or less sessile. The flowers are arranged in leaf axils in sessile, oval heads up to 35 mm (1.4 in) long with a few overlapping elliptic involucral bracts at the base. The flowers are 25–35 mm (0.98–1.38 in) long and pale pink to purplish pink. Flowering occurs from July to October and the fruit is a hairy, spherical nut, fused with others in an oval head about 10 mm (0.39 in) in diameter.

== Taxonomy ==
Isopogon axillaris was first formally described in 1810 by Robert Brown in the Transactions of the Linnean Society of London.

== Distribution and habitat ==
This isopogon grows in wet or swampy areas from near Karridale to Albany in the south-west of Western Australia.

== Conservation status ==
Isopogon axillaris is classified as "not threatened" by the Government of Western Australia Department of Parks and Wildlife.
