= Isopogon alcicornis =

Elkhorn coneflower

Conservation status
- Priority Three — Poorly Known Taxa (DEC)

Scientific classification
- Kingdom: Plantae
- Clade: Tracheophytes
- Clade: Angiosperms
- Clade: Eudicots
- Order: Proteales
- Family: Proteaceae
- Genus: Isopogon
- Species: I. alcicornis

Binomial name
- Isopogon alcicornis Diels
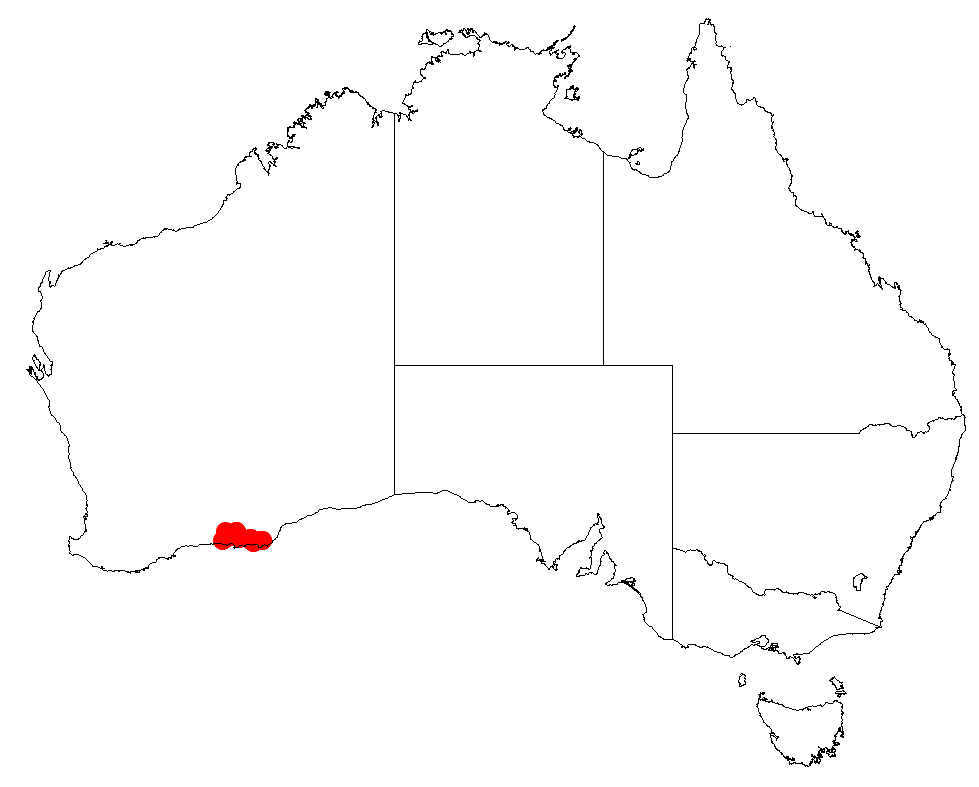
- Occurrence data from Australasian Virtual Herbarium

Species of shrub endemic to Western Australia

Isopogon alcicornis, commonly known as the elkhorn coneflower, is a plant in the family Proteaceae and is endemic to part of the South Coast Western Australia. It is a low shrub with pinnately-lobed leaves and oval heads of hairy, white or pink flowers.

== Description ==
Isopogon alcicornis is a shrub that typically grows to a height of about 45 cm (18 in) and has hairy pale brown to gray branchlets. The leaves are mostly pinnately lobed with two to five flat lobes, linear to lance-shaped and 10–40 cm (3.9–15.7 in) long on a petiole up to 15 cm (5.9 in) or sometimes longer. The flowers are arranged in sessile, oval or elliptic heads up to 40 mm (1.6 in) in diameter on the ends of branchlets, each head with hairy, pink flowers often hidden by the leaves. There are hairy, spatula-shaped involucral bracts at the base of the flowering head. Flowering mainly occurs from October to November and the fruit is a hairy nut, fused in an oval head up to 25 mm (0.98 in) in diameter.

== Taxonomy ==
Isopogon alcicornis was first formally described in 1903 by Ludwig Diels in Botanische Jahrbücher für Systematik, Pflanzengeschichte und Pflanzengeographie.

== Distribution and habitat ==
Elkhorn coneflower grows in low shrubland on the near Esperance and on Mount Baring near the Cape Arid National Park in the south-west of Western Australia.

== Conservation status ==
This isopogon is classified as "Priority Three" by the Government of Western Australia Department of Parks and Wildlife meaning that it is poorly known and known from only a few locations but is not under imminent threat.
