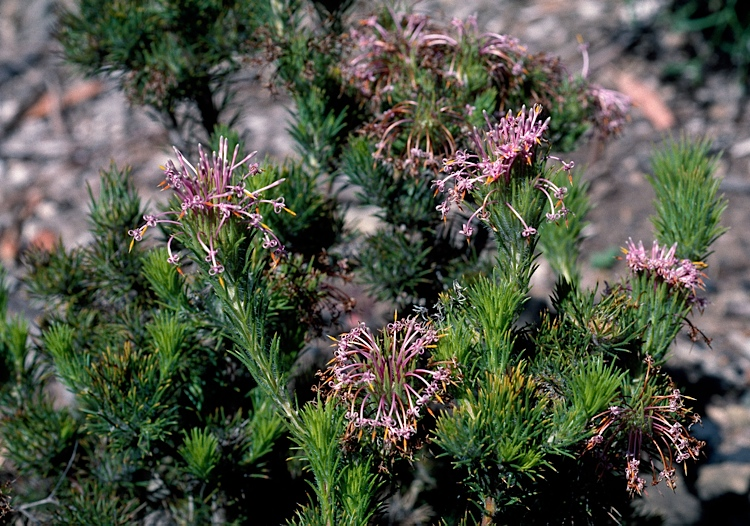
- In Illawarra Grevillea Park

Scientific classification
- Kingdom: Plantae
- Clade: Tracheophytes
- Clade: Angiosperms
- Clade: Eudicots
- Order: Proteales
- Family: Proteaceae
- Genus: Isopogon
- Species: I. adenanthoides

Binomial name
- Isopogon adenanthoides Meisn.
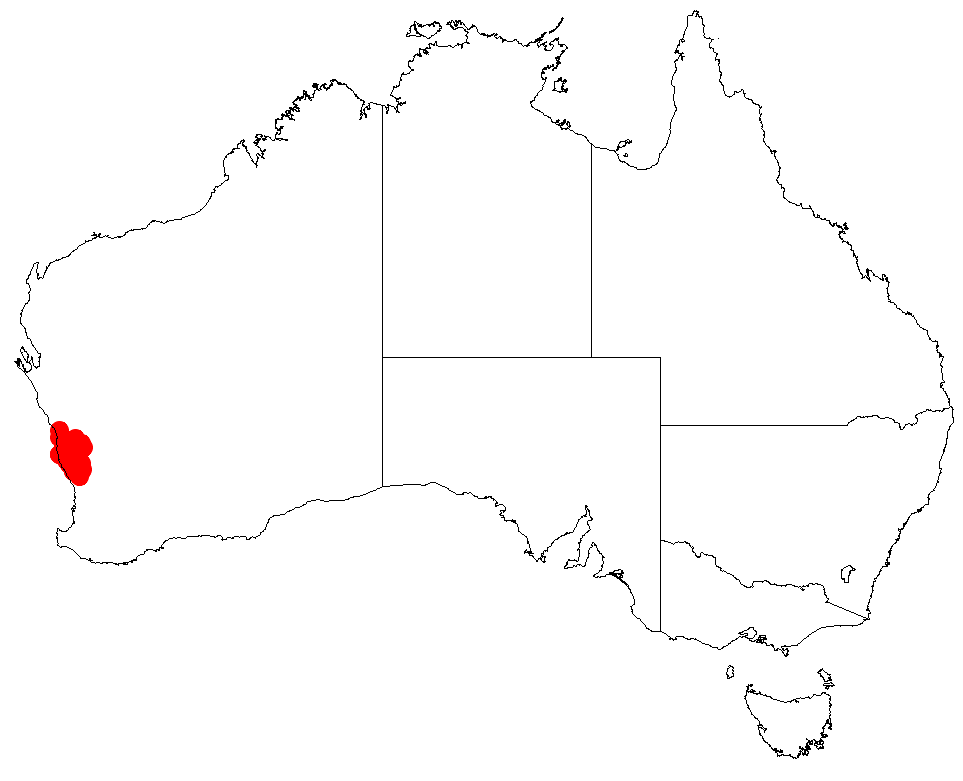
- Occurrence data from Australasian Virtual Herbarium

Synonyms
- Atylus adenanthoides (Meisn.) Kuntze

= Isopogon adenanthoides =

Spider coneflower

Species of shrub endemic to Western Australia

Isopogon adenanthoides, commonly known as spider coneflower, is species of flowering plant in the family Proteaceae and is endemic to the southwest of Western Australia. It is an erect shrub with sharply-pointed, trifid leaves and spherical heads of pink flowers.

== Description ==
Isopogon adenanthoides is an erect shrub that typically grows to about 1 m (3 ft 3 in) high and wide with hairy grey to brownish branchlets. The leaves are trifid with sharply-pointed tips, 10–18 mm (0.39–0.71 in) long and 0.7–1 mm (0.028–0.039 in) wide on a petiole 2–8 mm (0.079–0.315 in) long. The flowers are arranged in sessile heads about 40–45 mm (1.6–1.8 in) in diameter on the ends of branchlets, each head with up to about twenty-five glabrous, pink flowers, the heads with hairy, egg-shaped involucral bracts at the base. Flowering occurs from July to October and the fruit is a hairy nut up to about 4 mm (0.16 in) long, fused in a spherical head about 15 mm (0.59 in) in diameter.

== Taxonomy ==
Isopogon adenanthoides was first formally described in 1855 by Carl Meissner in Hooker's Journal of Botany and Kew Garden Miscellany from specimens collected by James Drummond.

== Distribution and habitat ==
Spider coneflower grows in shrubland and heath from near Eneabba and Badgingarra to near Moora in the south-west of Western Australia.

== Conservation status ==
This isopogon is classified as "not threatened" by the Western Australian Government Department of Parks and Wildlife.
