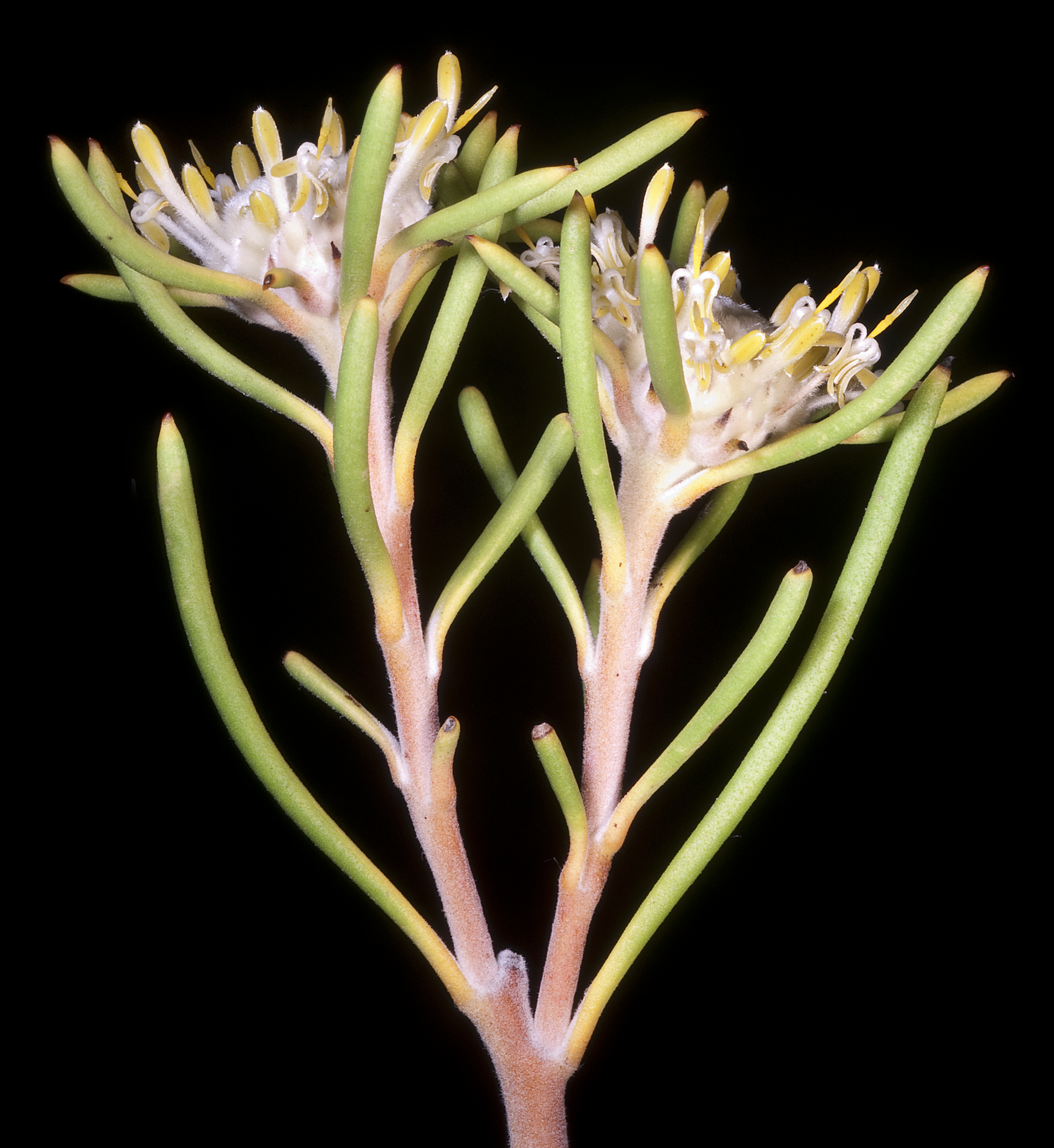

Scientific classification
- Kingdom: Plantae
- Clade: Tracheophytes
- Clade: Angiosperms
- Clade: Eudicots
- Order: Proteales
- Family: Proteaceae
- Genus: Isopogon
- Species: I. drummondii

Binomial name
- Isopogon drummondii Hügel ex Jacques
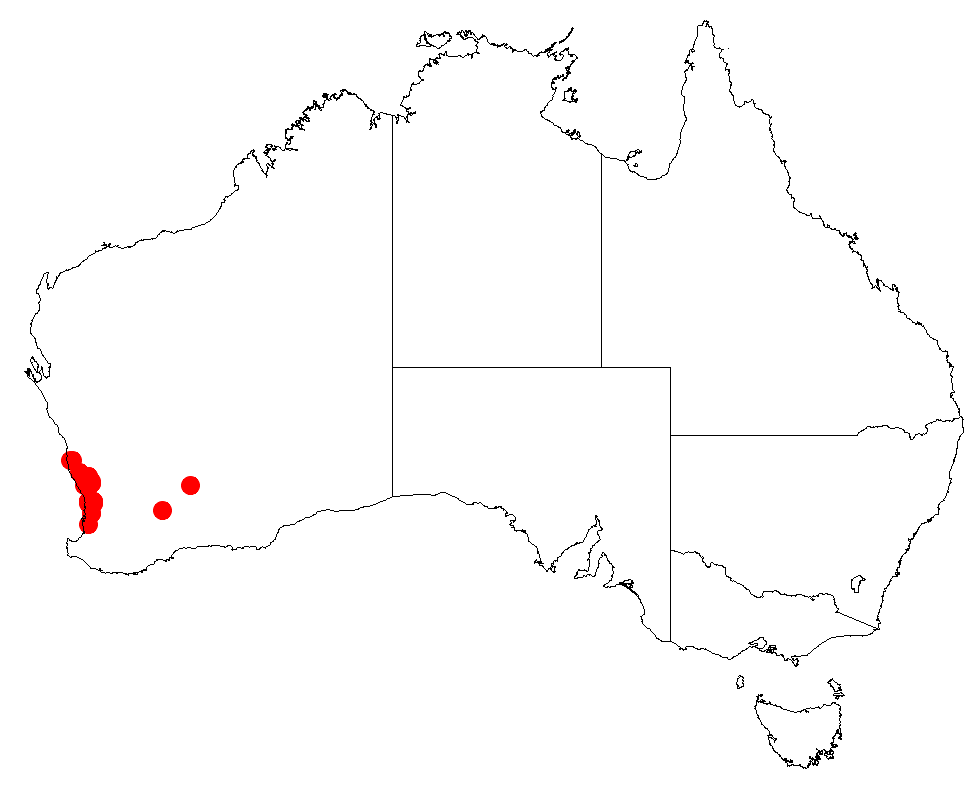
- Occurrence data from Australasian Virtual Herbarium

Synonyms
- Atylus drummondii Kuntze; Isopogon drummondii Benth. nom. illeg.; Isopogon drumundii Jacques orth. var.; Isopogon petrophiloides auct. non R.Br.: Meisner, C.D.F. in Lehmann, J.G.C. (ed.)

= Isopogon drummondii =

Species of shrub endemic to Western Australia

Isopogon drummondii is a small shrub of the family Proteaceae and is endemic to the southwest of Western Australia. It was first formally described in 1843 by Henri Antoine Jacques in Annales de Flore et de Pomone from an unpublished description by Hügel.

In 1870, George Bentham described I. drummondii in Flora Australiensis but since the name had already been used for a different species, Bentham's name was a Nomen illegitimum.

In a 2019 paper in the journal Nuytsia, Barbara Lynette Rye and Terry Desmond Macfarlane proposed that I. drummondii is a synonym of Isopogon sphaerocephalus subsp. spaerocaphalus. Rye and Macfarlane also proposed that Bentham was not aware of Jacques's I. drummondii because the description had been published in a horticultural magazine, from specimens grown in a greenhouse in France. They suggested the new name ''Isopogon autumnalis for Bentham's I. drummondii and that since Lindley's I. sphaerocaphalus was described first, I. drummondii Hügel ex Jacques would be reduced to synonymy.

As at November 2020, the Australian Plant Census continues to accept the name Isopogon drummondii Hügel ex Jacques.
