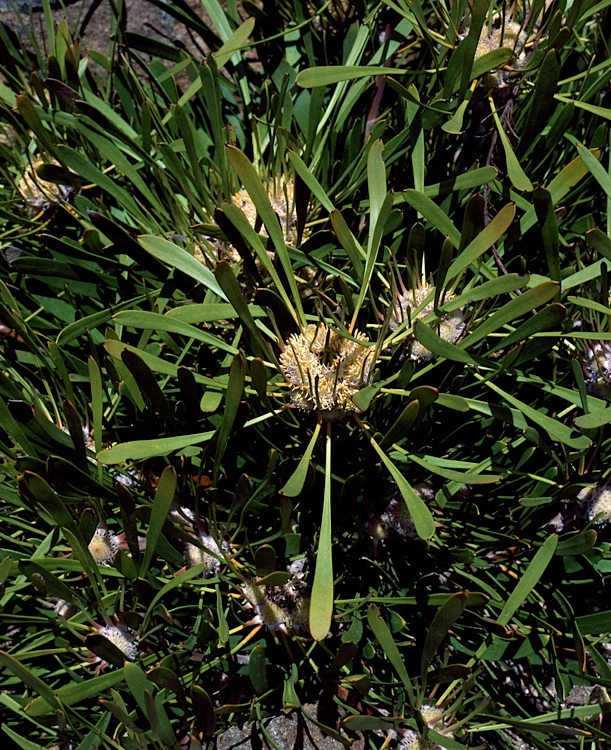
- Isopogon polycephalus in the ANBG

Scientific classification
- Kingdom: Plantae
- Clade: Tracheophytes
- Clade: Angiosperms
- Clade: Eudicots
- Order: Proteales
- Family: Proteaceae
- Genus: Isopogon
- Species: I. polycephalus

Binomial name
- Isopogon polycephalus R.Br.
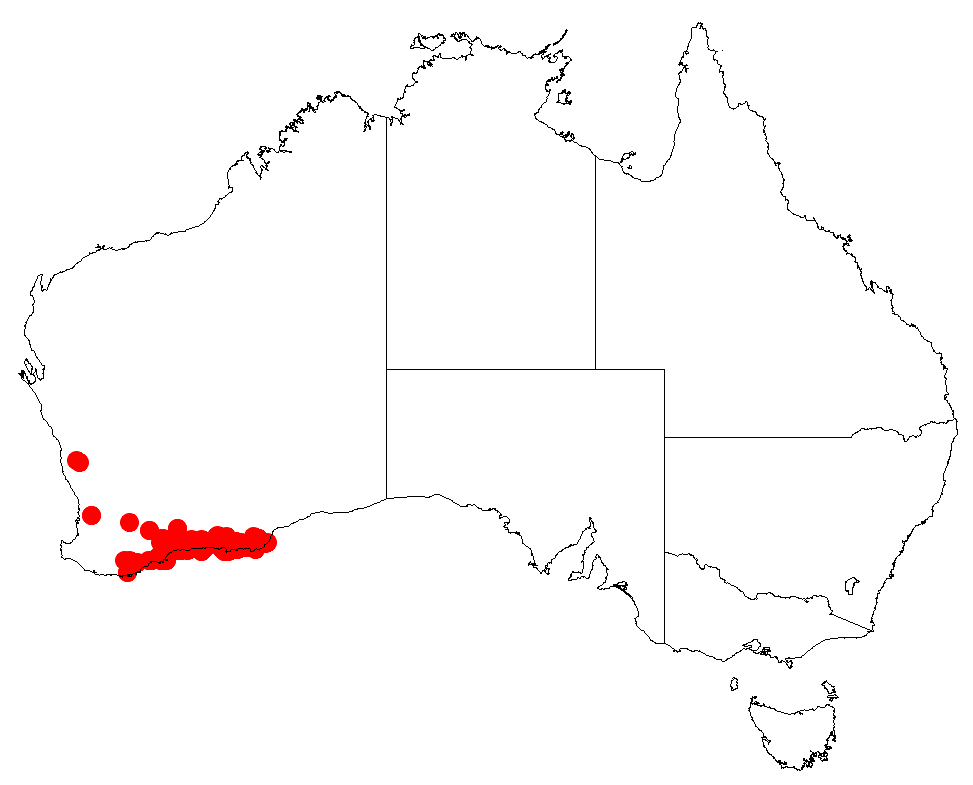
- Occurrence data from Australasian Virtual Herbarium

= Isopogon polycephalus =

Clustered coneflower

Species of shrub endemic to Western Australia

Isopogon polycephalus, commonly known as clustered coneflower, is a species of plant in the family Proteaceae and is endemic to the South coast of Western Australia. It is a spreading shrub with linear to lance-shaped leaves with the narrower end towards the base, and clusters of more or less spherical heads of white, cream-coloured or yellow flowers.

== Description ==
Isopogon polycephalus is a spreading shrub that typically grows to a height of about 1 m (3 ft 3 in) and has densely hairy, reddish brown branchlets. The leaves are mostly linear to lance-shaped with the narrower end towards the base, 60–120 mm (2.4–4.7 in) long, and 6–10 mm (0.24–0.39 in) wide, ending in hard, sharp point. The flowers are arranged in sessile, more or less spherical, often clustered heads 25–30 mm (0.98–1.18 in) in diameter, with linear to narrow egg-shaped involucral bracts at the base. The flowers are 10–15 mm (0.39–0.59 in) long, white, cream-coloured or yellow and glabrous. Flowering occurs from August to January and the fruit is a hairy nut, fused with others in a more or less spherical head about 20 mm (0.79 in) in diameter.

== Taxonomy ==
Isopogon polycephalus was first formally described in 1810 by Robert Brown in Transactions of the Linnean Society. The specific epithet (polycephalus) means "many-headed".

== Distribution and habitat ==
Clustered coneflower grows in sandy soil in heath or sandplain between East Mount Barren and Condingup, near the south coast of Western Australia.

== Conservation status ==
Isopogon polycephalus is classified as "not threatened" by the Government of Western Australia Department of Parks and Wildlife.
