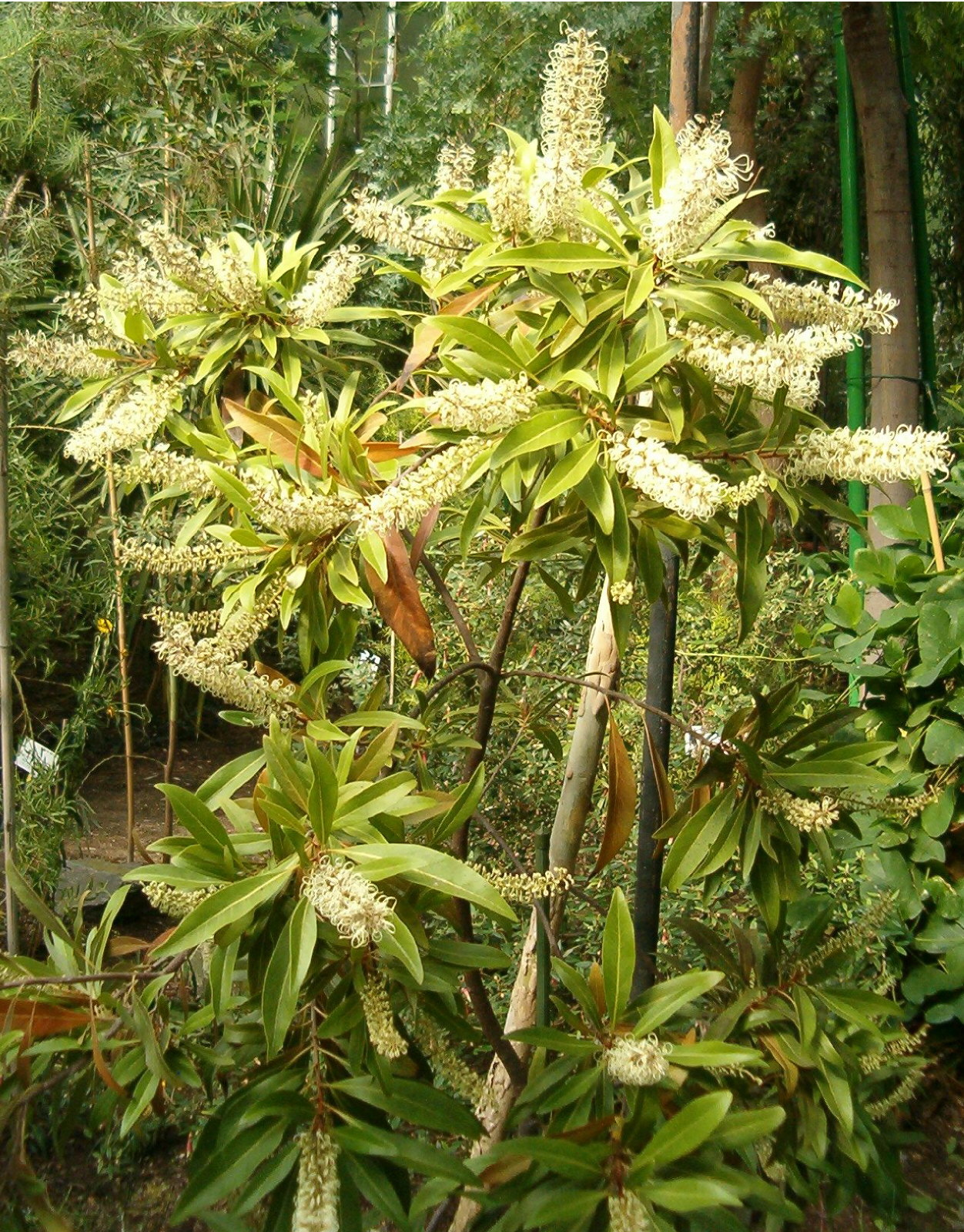
- Buckinghamia celsissima

Scientific classification
- Kingdom: Plantae
- Clade: Tracheophytes
- Clade: Angiosperms
- Clade: Eudicots
- Order: Proteales
- Family: Proteaceae
- Subfamily: Grevilleoideae
- Tribe: Embothrieae
- Subtribe: Hakeinae
- Genus: Buckinghamia; F.Muell

Species
- See text

= Buckinghamia =

Genus of flowering plants

Buckinghamia is a genus of only two known species of trees, belonging to the plant family Proteaceae. They are endemic to the rainforests of the wet tropics region of north eastern Queensland, Australia. The ivory curl flower, B. celsissima, is the well known, popular and widely cultivated species in gardens and parks, in eastern and southern mainland Australia, and additionally as street trees north from about Brisbane. The second species, B. ferruginiflora, was only recently described in 1988.

== History, classification and evolution ==
The genus was named in 1868 by Ferdinand von Mueller in honour of Richard Grenville, the Duke of Buckingham, who was Secretary of State for the Colonies from 1866 to 1868. It was initially placed in a tribe Grevilleae, but the feature of having four ovules per carpel led Chellapilla Venkata Rao to classify it in the tribe Telopeae, and within this a new subtribe Hollandaeae based on the antero-posterior orientation of the perianth, with the genera Hollandaea, Cardwellia, Knightia, Opisthiolepis and Stenocarpus.

Lawrie Johnson and Barbara G. Briggs recognised the affinities of this genus with the rainforest taxon Opisthiolepis and classified the two in the subtribe Buckinghamiinae within the tribe Embothrieae in the subfamily Grevilleoideae in their 1975 monograph "On the Proteaceae: the evolution and classification of a southern family", and thus related to Lomatia, Stenocarpus and the Embothriinae. However, analysis of chloroplast sequences revealed a much closer relationship of Buckinghamia and Opisthiolepis with Grevillea instead. Both genera have eleven pairs of chromosomes, which is reduced further in Grevillea. More recent evolutionary botanical science confirms that they correlate closest with the genera Opisthiolepis, Finschia, Grevillea and Hakea in the subtribe Hakeinae, with Buckinghamia and Opisthiolepis as two early offshoots from the ancestors of the other three genera.

== Species and summary descriptions ==
- Buckinghamia celsissima F.Muell., ivory curl, ivory curl flower, spotted silky oak, buckinghamia silky oak
- Buckinghamia ferruginiflora Foreman & B.Hyland

Buckinghamia celsissima (ivory curl flower) trees grow up to about 10 m (35 ft) tall in Australian gardens, parks and botanic gardens and much taller naturally to about 30 m (100 ft). The leaves are glossy dark green, and either lobed or entire, with new growth flushed pink. Spectacular in flower, they bear long showy sprays of sweetly fragrant, creamy-white flowers in summer. In a garden they can grow in full sun or part shade, and will attract birds and bees. Hardy and spectacular trees, they make ideal screens or windbreaks in a garden.

B. celsissima (ivory curl flower) trees in the botanic gardens in Adelaide, Melbourne, Sydney and Brisbane have been in cultivation for over a hundred years. They grow outdoors successfully in places as temperate as the Royal Botanic Gardens, Melbourne. Its notable landscape designer and director William Guilfoyle already had them growing there over one hundred years ago, resulting today in beautifully flowering, slow growing, established small trees. In the same late 1800s period the Adelaide Botanic Gardens already had them in cultivation also. They are popular and widely cultivated in many parks and gardens in coastal regions of eastern and southern mainland Australia, notably also their long history of planting in Brisbane as street trees.

B. celsissima rainforest trees grow naturally up to about 30 m (100 ft) tall in tropical rainforests of north eastern Queensland from about 200 to 1,000 m (700 to 3,300 ft) altitude.

Buckinghamia ferruginiflora (Noah's Oak, Spotted Oak) is a species of rainforest trees growing naturally up to about 30 m (100 ft) tall.

Botanists scientifically recognised these trees’ differences only from about the early 1970s. They have only found them growing naturally in a restricted area of the Daintree region. They grow in luxuriant tropical rainforests from sea level through an area of lowlands up to lower uplands at an altitude of about 350 m (1,150 ft).

Buckinghamia ferruginiflora was formally scientifically described in 1988 by Don Foreman and Bernie Hyland. They have: branchlets often hairy; leaves 9–20 cm (4–8 in) long, 2–6 cm (1–2 in) wide; buds, shoots and flower structures with dense ferruginous (rusty coloured) hairs; flower structures of compound inflorescences 8–20 cm (3–8 in) long; individual flowers creamy brown, with the dense rusty hairs on the tepals’ outer surfaces; styles shorter (7–8 mm (0.28–0.31 in)) than B. celsissima (15–20 mm (0.6–0.8 in)); fruits follicles 2–2.5 cm (0.8–1.0 in) long; seeds flat with a small wing.

B. ferruginiflora’s, restricted, endemic, distribution has obtained the conservation status of "near threatened" currently officially listed by the Queensland government legislation, the Nature Conservation Act 1992.
