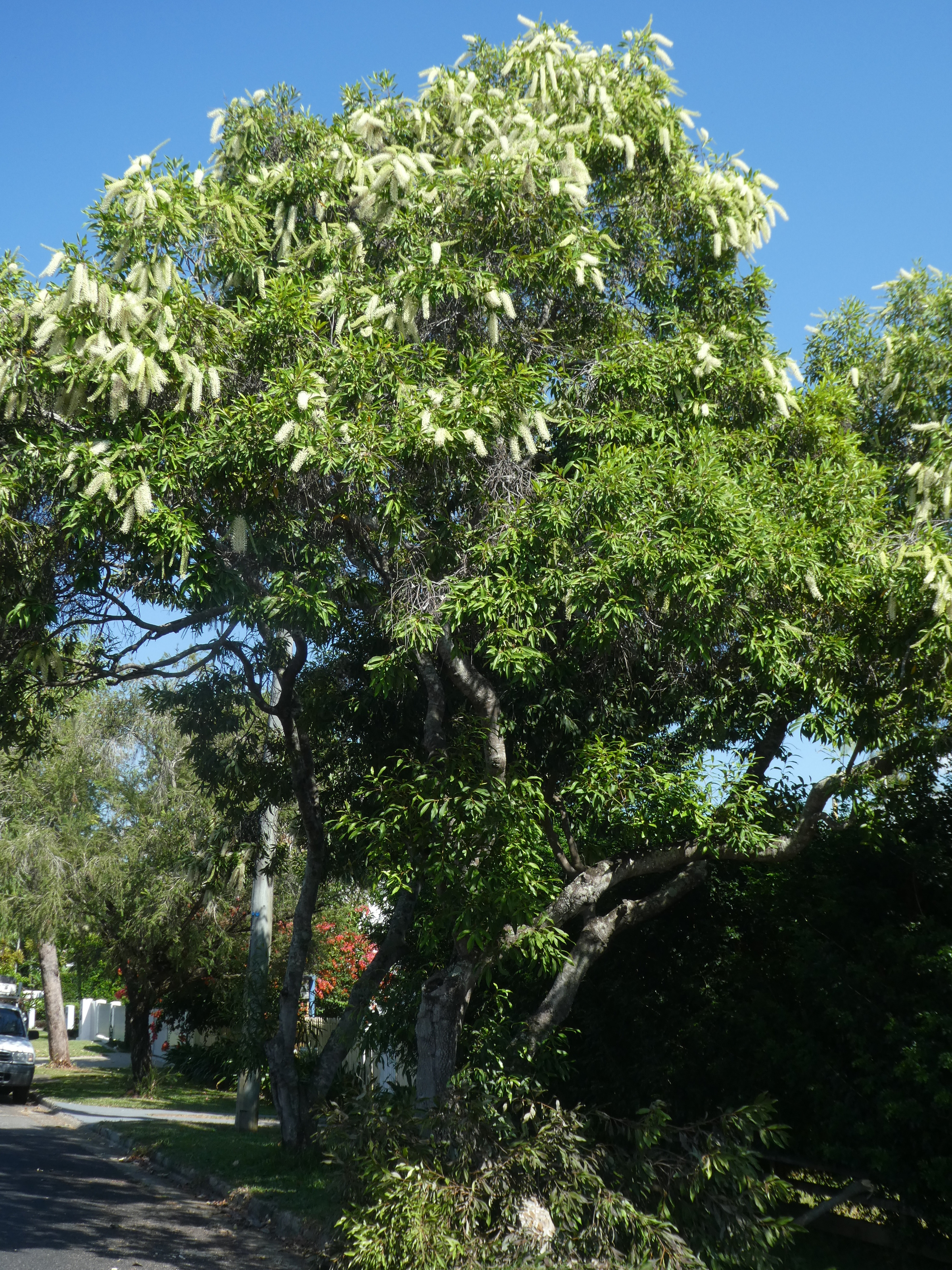
- Street tree in Cairns, Queensland, December 2022

Conservation status
- Least Concern (NCA)

Scientific classification
- Kingdom: Plantae
- Clade: Embryophytes
- Clade: Tracheophytes
- Clade: Spermatophytes
- Clade: Angiosperms
- Clade: Eudicots
- Order: Proteales
- Family: Proteaceae
- Genus: Buckinghamia
- Species: B. celsissima

Binomial name
- Buckinghamia celsissima F.Muell.
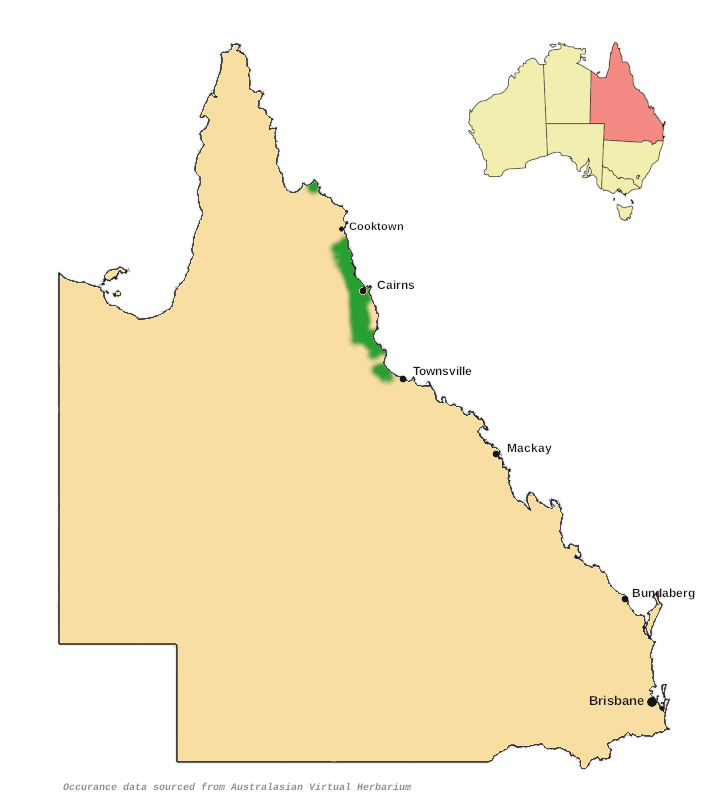

= Buckinghamia celsissima =

Ivory curl tree

Species of plant endemic to Australia

Buckinghamia celsissima, commonly known as the ivory curl tree, ivory curl flower or spotted silky oak, is a species of tree in the family Proteaceae. It is endemic to the tropical rainforests of northeastern Queensland, Australia.

== Description ==
Buckinghamia celsissima is a large tree growing up to 30 m (98 ft) tall in its natural rainforest habitat, but is much smaller when cultivated. The leaves are dark green above and somewhat glaucous or whitish below, held on petioles about 10–20 mm (0.4–0.8 in) long. While the first few leaves on a new shoot may be deeply lobed, those on older twigs are simple with entire margins (see gallery). These mature leaves are elliptic and grow to lengths of around 20 cm (7.9 in) and 7 cm (2.8 in) wide.

The showy cream-coloured flowers appear over summer and autumn. The inflorescence is an axillary or terminal pendant raceme up to 27 cm (11 in) in length. Individual flowers are densely clustered on the axis, on pedicels about 8 mm (0.3 in) long and have tepals around 7–10 mm (0.3–0.4 in) long.

Fruits of the ivory curl tree are follicles, green in colour while developing but turning brown or black on maturity. At this point they are up to 30 mm (1.2 in) long by 20 mm (0.8 in) wide and contain up to 6 small brown seeds, which are released as the fruit dehisces.

== Taxonomy ==
This species was described in 1868 by the German-born Australian botanist Ferdinand von Mueller, based on material collected by John Dallachy near Rockingham Bay in 1865. Mueller published his description in volume 6 of his massive work Fragmenta phytographiae Australiae. B. celsissima is one of only two species in the genus, the other being Buckinghamia ferruginiflora, described in 1988.

=== Etymology ===
Mueller created the genus Buckinghamia in honour of Richard Temple-Grenville, the 3rd Duke of Buckingham. The species epithet celsissima is from the Latin celsus, meaning "tall", "proud" or "noble", combined with the suffix -issimus, "very".

== Distribution and habitat ==
The natural range of Buckinghamia celsissima is northeastern Queensland from near Rossville to the Paluma Range, north of Townsville, at altitudes from 200 m (660 ft) to 1,000 m (3,280 ft).

It grows in well developed rainforest on deep red volcanic soils, as well as drier rainforest types associated with kauri pine.

== Ecology ==
The ivory curl tree is one of the host species for larvae of the cornelian butterfly. When in flower it will attract a variety of insects to the inflorescences, among them the beetle Dilochrosis brownii, which in turn attracts insectivorous birds. The seeds are eaten by crimson rosellas (Platycercus elegans).

== Conservation ==
This species is listed by the Queensland Department of Environment and Science as least concern. As of 15 December 2022, it has not been assessed by the IUCN.

== Cultivation ==
The ivory curl tree has become a popular planting in parks, streets and private gardens in regions far beyond the natural range of the tree. Its popularity is due to the ease of cultivation, the mass flowering and its variable foliage shape and colour. It grows well even as far south as Sydney and Melbourne, but only reaches about 7–8 m (23–26 ft) tall in these areas.

== Gallery ==
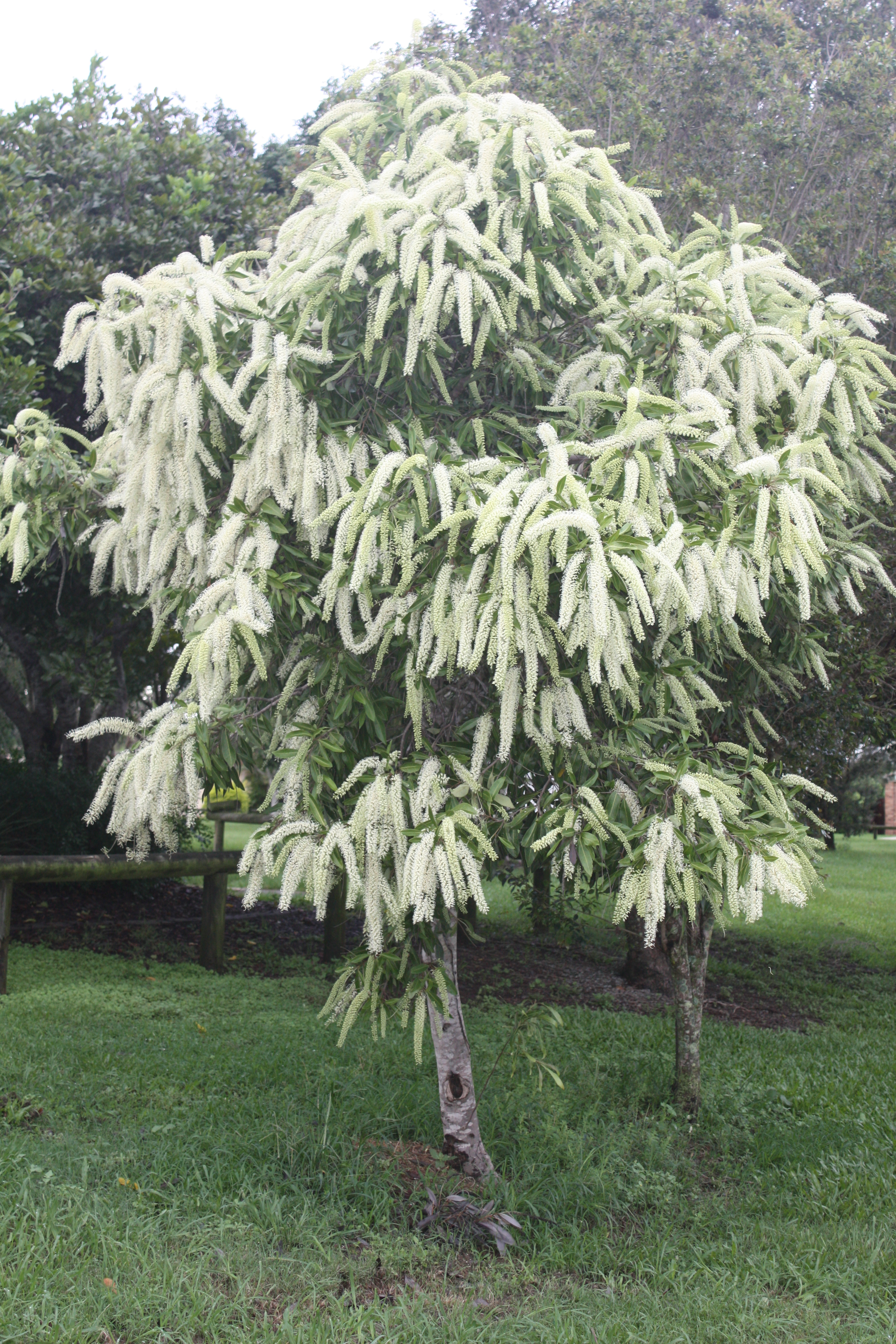
Young tree in Brisbane

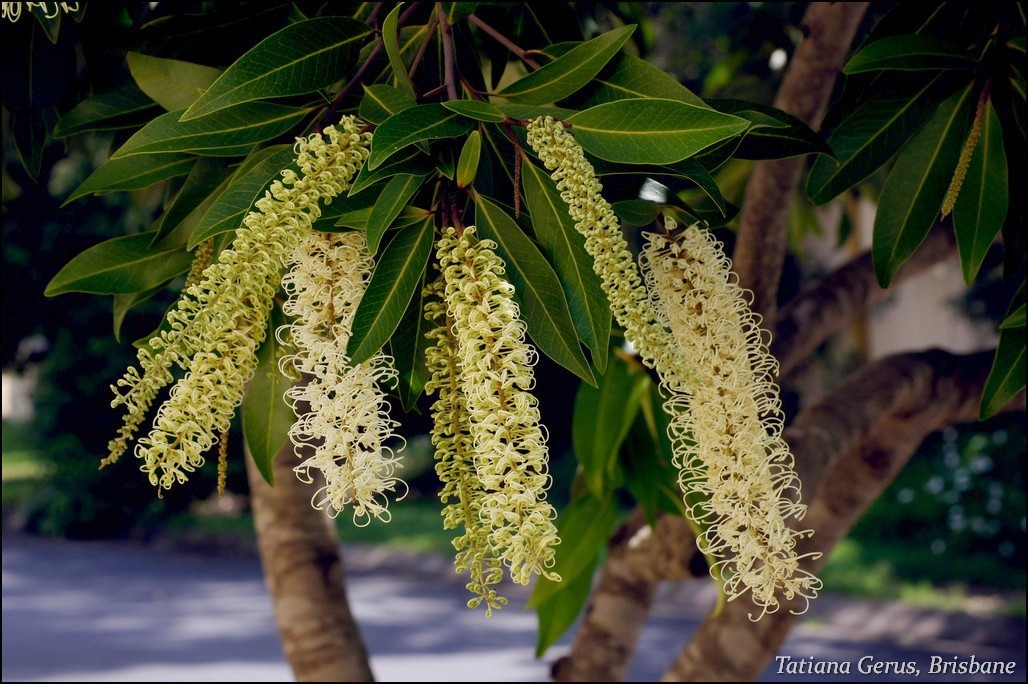
Foliage and flowers

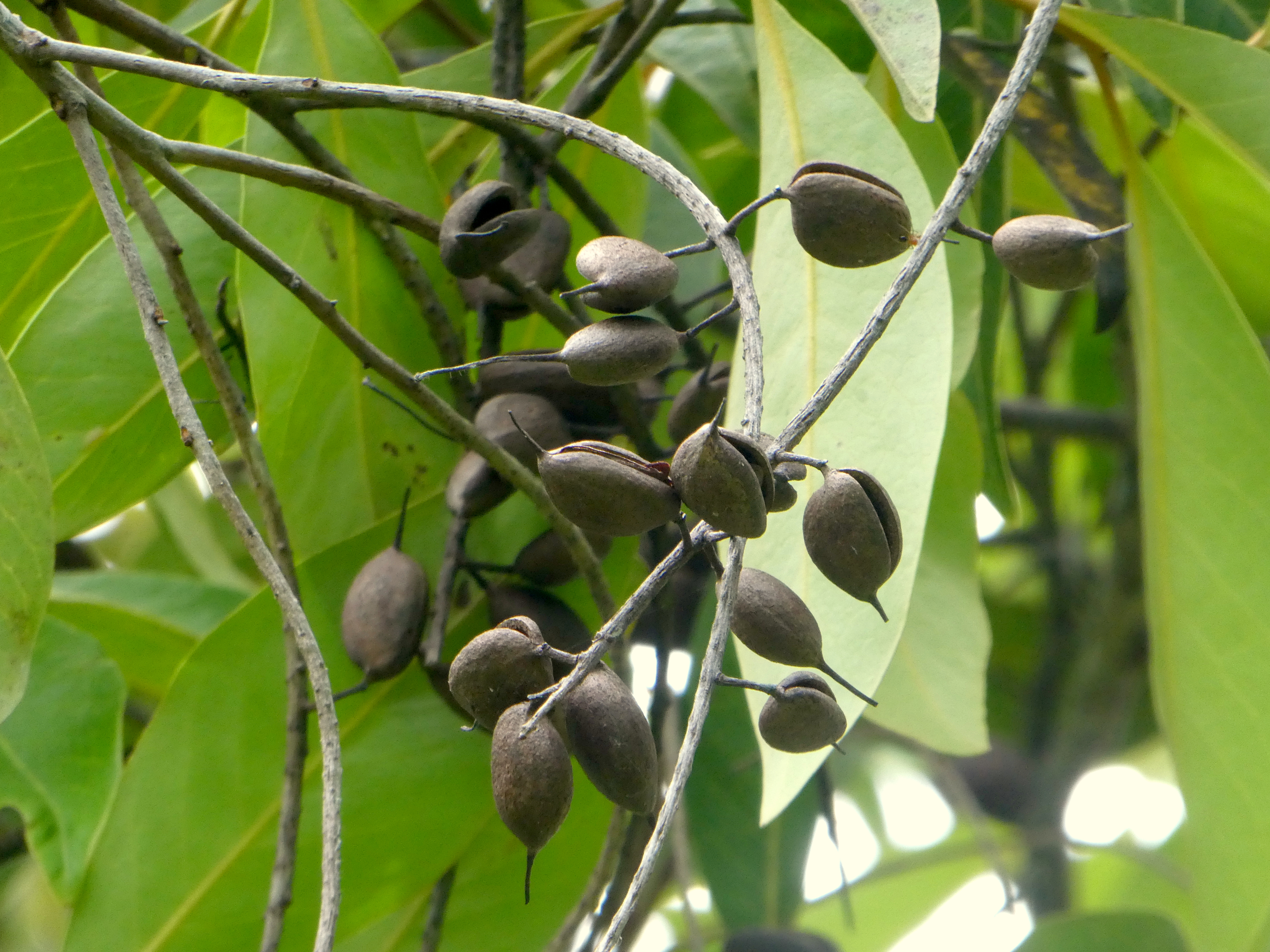
Dehiscing fruit

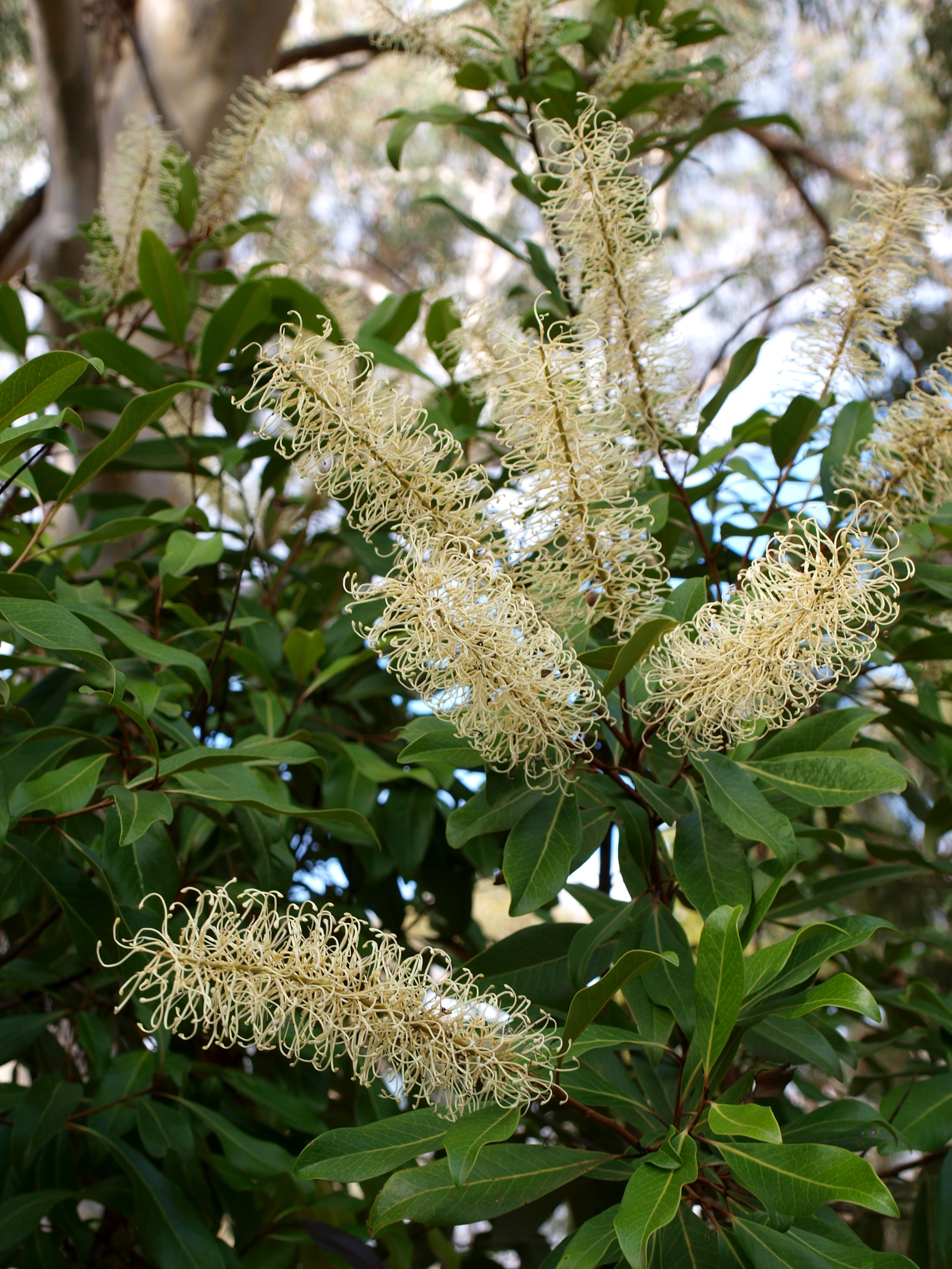
Flowers

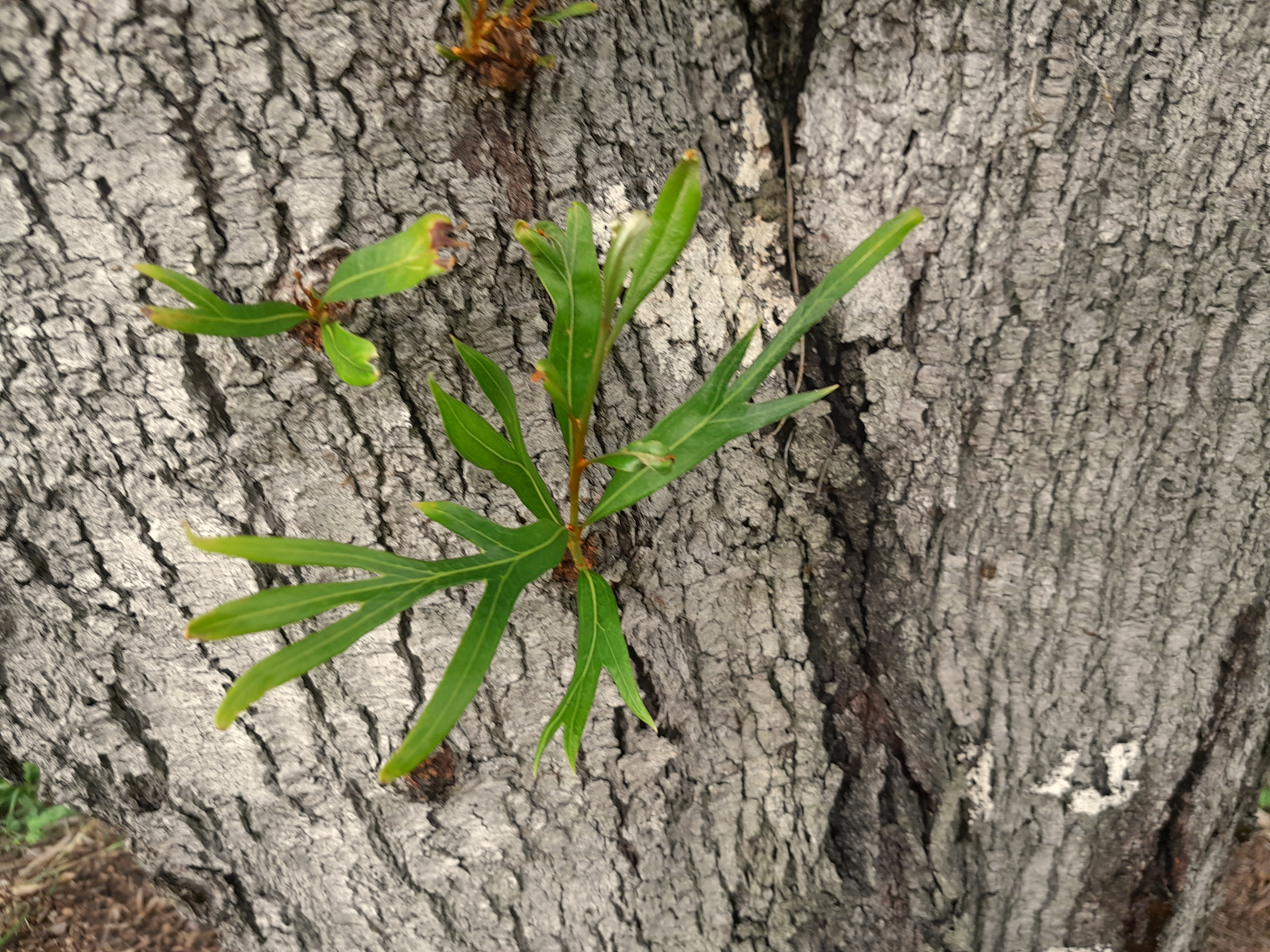
Young lobed leaves

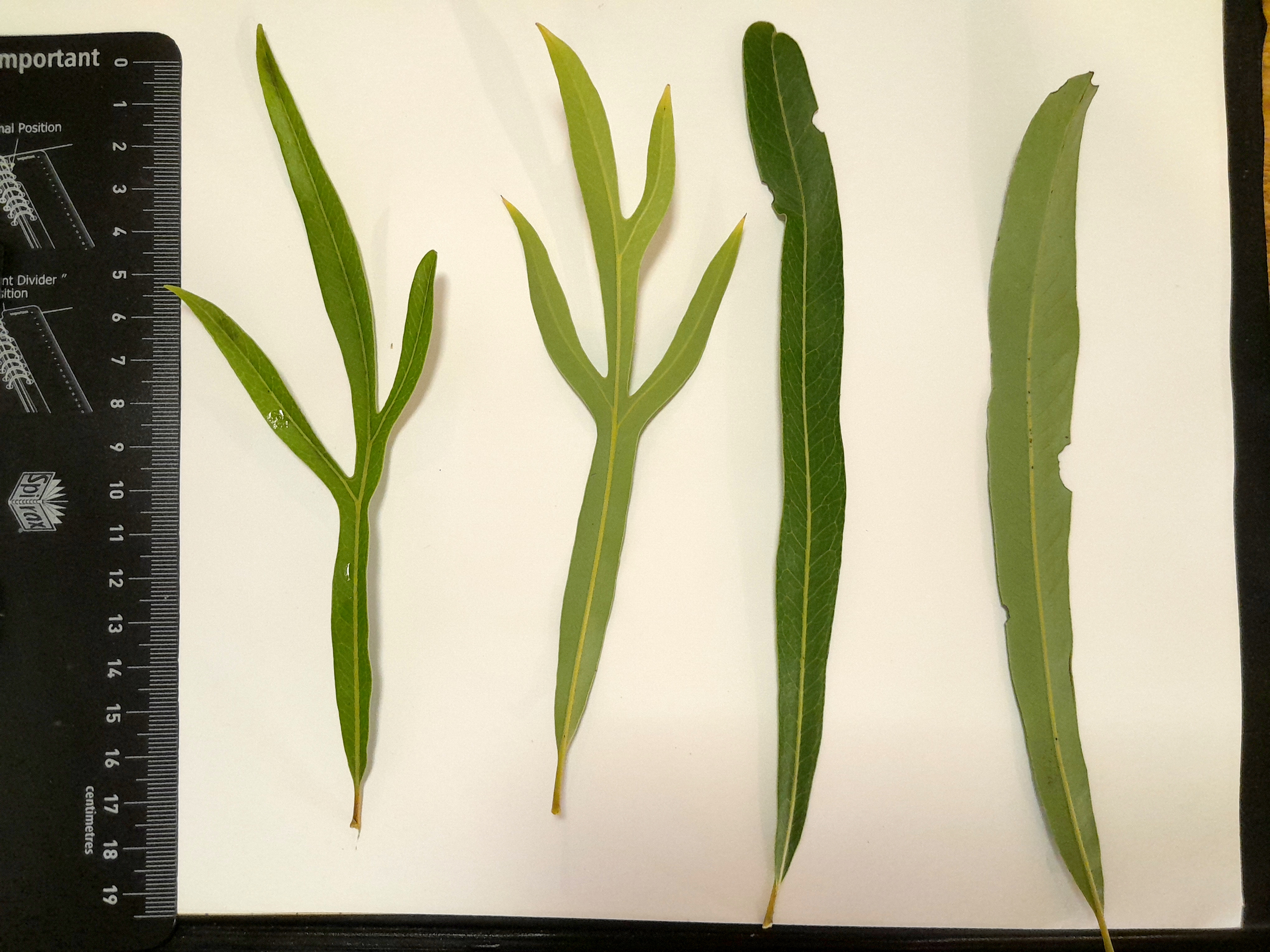
Lobed and entire leaves compared
