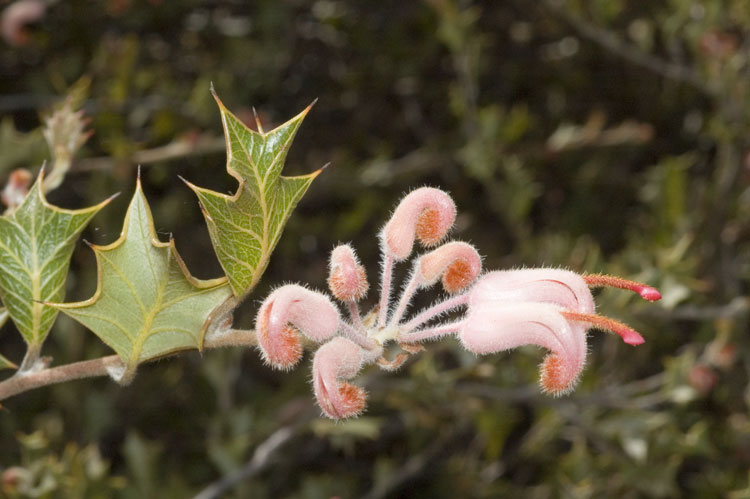
- Subspecies pilosa in the Australian National Botanic Gardens

Scientific classification
- Kingdom: Plantae
- Clade: Tracheophytes
- Clade: Angiosperms
- Clade: Eudicots
- Order: Proteales
- Family: Proteaceae
- Genus: Grevillea
- Species: G. pilosa

Binomial name
- Grevillea pilosa A.S.George

Synonyms
- Grevillea rufa C.A.Gardner

= Grevillea pilosa =

Species of shrub endemic to Western Australia

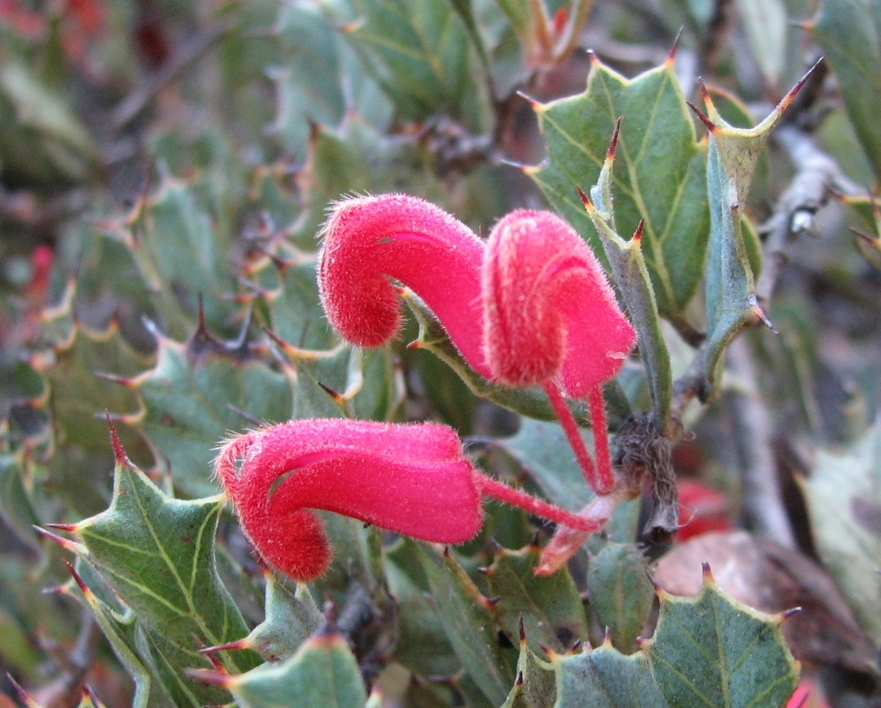
Subspecies redacta in Maranoa Gardens

Grevillea pilosa is a species of flowering plant in the family Proteaceae and is endemic to the south-west of Western Australia. It is a spreading to prostrate shrub with wedge-shaped to oblong leaves with sharply pointed, more or less triangular teeth or lobes, and clusters of pale pink to rose-pink or red flowers.

== Description ==
Grevillea pilosa is a dense, spreading to prostrate shrub that typically grows to a height of 0.5–2 m (1 ft 8 in – 6 ft 7 in) and does not form a lignotuber. Its leaves are wedge-shaped to oblong or egg-shaped, 15–50 mm (0.59–1.97 in) long and 10–60 mm (0.39–2.36 in) wide with sharply pointed, more or less triangular teeth or lobes 2–7 mm (0.079–0.276 in) long and 2–4 mm (0.079–0.157 in) wide. The edges of the leaves are turned down, the lower surface covered with silky hairs. The flowers are arranged in more or less spherical clusters on a rachis 2–7 mm (0.079–0.276 in) long and are pale pink to rose-pink or red, the pistil 20–27 mm (0.79–1.06 in) long. Flowering time varies with subspecies and the fruit is a more or less spherical to oblong or oval follicle about 12 mm (0.47 in) long.

== Taxonomy ==
This grevillea was first formally described in 1942 by Charles Gardner who gave it the name Grevillea rufa in the Journal of the Royal Society of Western Australia but the name was illegitimate because it had been used for a different species (Grevillea rufa (Warb.) Sleumer), now known as Finschia rufa.

In 1965, Alex George changed the name to Grevillea pilosa in the Western Australian Naturalist. The specific epithet (pilosa) means "hairy", referring to the flowers.

In 1994, Peter Olde and Neil Marriott described G. pilosa subsp. redacta and the name, and that or the autonym are accepted by the Australian Plant Census:

- Grevillea pilosa A.S.George subsp. pilosa has leaves 15–60 mm (0.59–2.36 in) wide with 3 to 11 teeth or lobes, the flowers pale pink to red with a red or rusty-brown style, the perianth 3.5–6.5 mm (0.14–0.26 in) wide from June to December.
- Grevillea pilosa subsp. redacta Olde & Marriott has leaves 10–15 mm (0.39–0.59 in) wide with 3 to 5 shallow teeth or lobes, the flowers rose-pink with a pinkish red style, the perianth 2.5–3.0 mm (0.098–0.118 in) wide from August to December.

== Distribution and habitat ==
This grevillea grows in mallee shrubland or heath, subspecies pilosa between Newdegate, Mount Holland and Ravensthorpe in the Coolgardie, Esperance Plains and Mallee bioregions and subsp. redacta further north, in a small area just north of Lake Cronin to north of Mount Holland in the Coolgardie and Mallee bioregions of south-western Western Australia.

== Conservation status ==
Subspecies pilosa is listed as "not threatened" but subsp. redacta is listed as "Priority Three" by the Government of Western Australia Department of Biodiversity, Conservation and Attractions, meaning that it is poorly known and known from only a few locations but is not under imminent threat.
