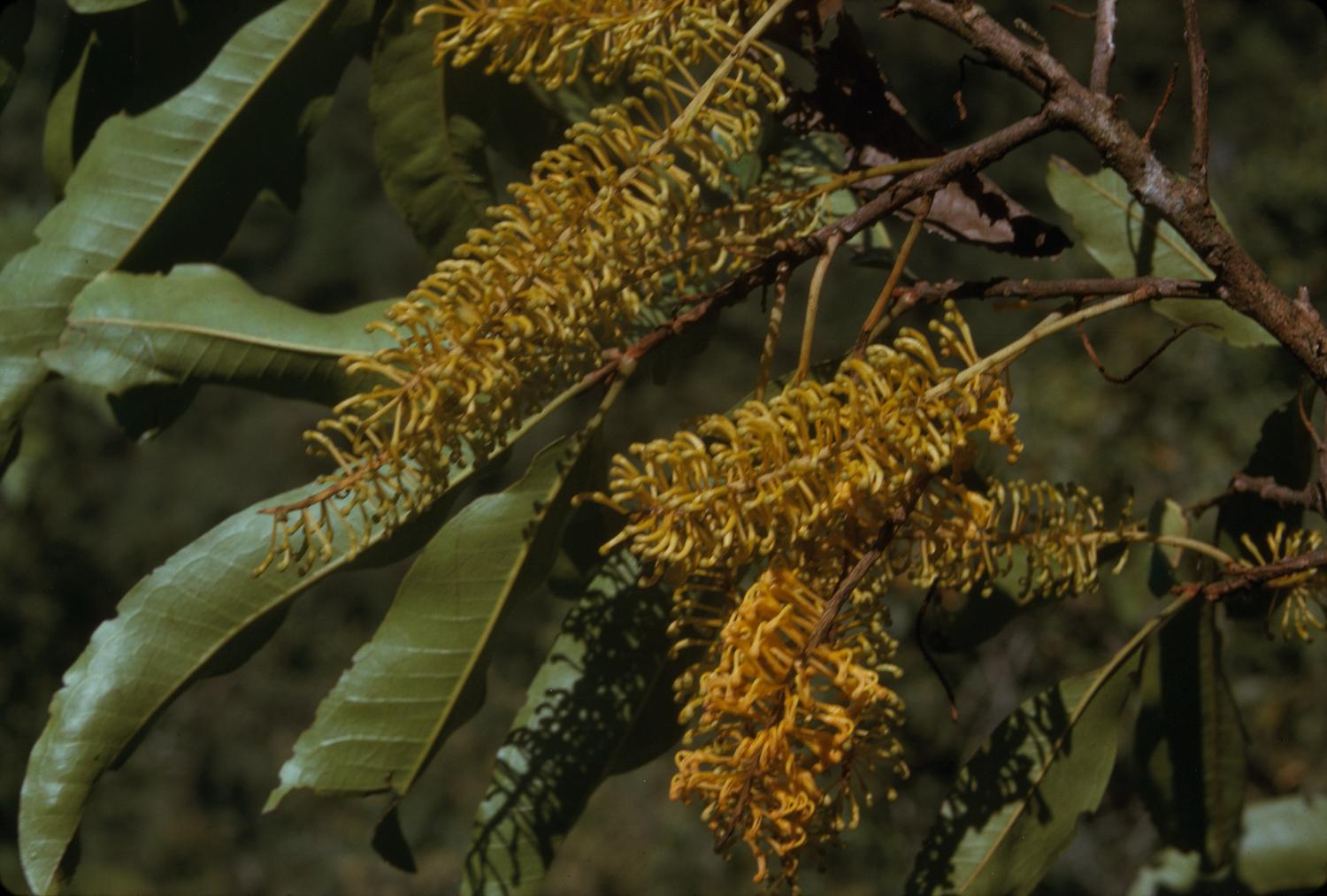
- In the Sarwaket Range, Papua New Guinea

Conservation status
- Least Concern (IUCN 3.1)

Scientific classification
- Kingdom: Plantae
- Clade: Embryophytes
- Clade: Tracheophytes
- Clade: Angiosperms
- Clade: Eudicots
- Order: Proteales
- Family: Proteaceae
- Genus: Finschia
- Species: F. chloroxantha

Binomial name
- Finschia chloroxantha Diels

Synonyms
- Finschia densiflora (C.T.White) C.T.White ex F.S.Walker; Finschia micronesica (Kaneh.) Kaneh.; Finschia waterhouseana B.L.Burtt; Grevillea densiflora C.T.White; Grevillea elaeocarpifolia Guillaumin; Grevillea micronesiaca (Kaneh.) Sleumer; Helicia micronesica Kaneh.

= Finschia chloroxantha =

Species of tree native to Oceania

Finschia chloroxantha is a species of tree in the family Proteaceae and is native to Papua New Guinea, the Bismarck Archipelago, the Solomon Islands, the Aru Islands, Palau and Vanuatu. It is the most common and widely distributed of the four currently described Finschia species.
