= Finschia ferruginiflora =

Conservation status
- Endangered (IUCN 3.1)

Scientific classification
- Kingdom: Plantae
- Clade: Tracheophytes
- Clade: Angiosperms
- Clade: Eudicots
- Order: Proteales
- Family: Proteaceae
- Genus: Finschia
- Species: F. ferruginiflora

Binomial name
- Finschia ferruginiflora C.T.White

Species of tree endemic to Papua New Guinea

Finschia ferruginiflora is an endangered species of tree in the family Proteaceae and is endemic to Papua New Guinea.
