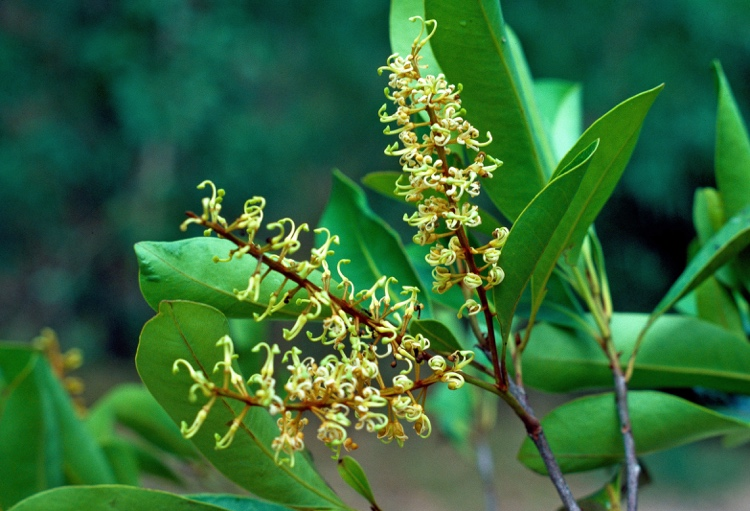
- Specimen in Queensland.

Scientific classification
- Kingdom: Plantae
- Clade: Tracheophytes
- Clade: Angiosperms
- Clade: Eudicots
- Order: Proteales
- Family: Proteaceae
- Genus: Buckinghamia
- Species: B. ferruginiflora

Binomial name
- Buckinghamia ferruginiflora Foreman & B.Hyland, 1988

= Buckinghamia ferruginiflora =

Species of plant endemic to Australia

Buckinghamia ferruginiflora, also known as Noah's oak or spotted oak, is a species of rainforest tree in the protea family, one of two in the genus that is endemic to the Wet Tropics of Queensland, north-eastern Australia. Although the tree's differences from its congener had been known since the 1970s, it was only formally described by Donald Foreman and Bernard Hyland in 1988 in the journal Muelleria.

== Description ==
The species grows naturally up to about 30 m (98 ft) in height. It has branchlets which are often hairy; leaves 9–20 cm (4–8 in) long, 2–6 cm (1–2 in) wide; buds, shoots and flower structures with dense ferruginous (rusty coloured) hairs. The flowers form compound inflorescences 8–20 cm (3–8 in) long; individual flowers are creamy brown, with dense rusty hairs on the tepals' outer surfaces; the styles are shorter (7–8 mm (0.28–0.31 in)) than those of B. celsissima (15–20 mm (0.6–0.8 in)). The fruit follicles are 2–2.5 cm (0.8–1.0 in) long; the seeds flat with a small wing.

== Distribution and habitat ==
The species is restricted to the area between Bloomfield and the Daintree River, in mature lowland and upland rainforest, with an altitudinal range from sea level to 350 m (1,150 ft).
