= Finschia =

Scientific classification
- Kingdom: Plantae
- Clade: Embryophytes
- Clade: Tracheophytes
- Clade: Angiosperms
- Clade: Eudicots
- Order: Proteales
- Family: Proteaceae
- Subfamily: Grevilleoideae
- Tribe: Embothrieae
- Subtribe: Hakeinae
- Genus: Finschia; Warb.

Type species
- Finschia rufa

Species
- See list

Genus of trees from New Guinea and surrounding region

Finschia is a genus of four recognised species of large trees, constituting part of the plant family Proteaceae. They grow naturally in New Guinea and its surrounding region, in habitats from lowland rainforests to steep highland forests.

== Description ==
Members of the genus Finschia are trees which grow up to 35 m (115 ft) tall. They often have large stilt roots growing out from up the trunk, sometimes from as high up as 1.8 m (6 ft) off the ground. Leaves are simple and entire with straight, pinnate, parallel veins collected by a looped intermarginal vein.

Flowers are arranged on an inflorescence, the pedicels are solitary or in pairs, free or joined at the lower part. The perianth is curved, the segments becoming free with subglobose limbs, Stamens are sessile or nearly so in the concave segments. The ovary has a single locule containing two ovules, is borne on a slender stipe and usually protrudes from the perianth in mature buds. Fruits are indehiscent, globular with a thin, fleshy exterior and thick, woody interior, containing 1 or 2 seeds with thick, fleshy cotyledons. The floral characteristics are described as being similar to that of Grevillea and the fruit similar to Helicia.

== Distribution ==
Finschia is distributed throughout Malesia and Papuasia. It is the only genus of the family Proteaceae that occurs naturally in the Solomon Islands. The most widely distributed species, F. chloroxantha occurs in Papua New Guinea and West Papua, the Bismarck Archipelago, the Solomon Islands, the Aru Islands, Palau and Vanuatu. The species F. carrii, F. ferruginiflora and F. rufa are found only on the main island of Papua New Guinea.

== Taxonomy ==
The genus Finschia was first formally described in Botanische Jahrbücher fur Systematik, Pflanzengeschichte und Pflanzengeographie in 1891. It was named after German explorer Friedrich Hermann Otto Finsch.

Published scientific morphology and anatomy observations places Finschia within the subtribe Hakeinae (tribe Embothrieae) and correlates the genus most closely with some species of Grevillea, then after that with Hakea. Dutch botanist H. O. Sleumer included them within the genus Grevillea in 1939 and in his 1958 Flora Malesiana (Proteaceae) description as again Finschia. In 2009 the first step was reported in the still early studies of their genetics.

The official national herbaria in Lae, Papua New Guinea holds numerous specimens of undescribed, potentially new species.

People from the region of New Guinea working professionally in government or science have published written reports of some of the traditional knowledge and uses of these species. The cooking and eating of the seeds after their planting and establishment as crops has been described in published written form in reports, articles and books.

== Species ==
There are currently four species accepted by Plants of the World Online, published by the Royal Botanic Gardens, Kew.

Species name	Distribution	IUCN status
Finschia carrii (Sleumer) C.T.White	New Guinea	
Finschia chloroxantha Diels	New Guinea, Bismarck Archipelago, Solomon Islands, Aru Islands, Palau and Vanuatu	
Finschia ferruginiflora C.T.White	New Guinea	
Finschia rufa Warb.	New Guinea	
