= Finschia rufa =

Conservation status
- Least Concern (IUCN 3.1)

Scientific classification
- Kingdom: Plantae
- Clade: Tracheophytes
- Clade: Angiosperms
- Clade: Eudicots
- Order: Proteales
- Family: Proteaceae
- Genus: Finschia
- Species: F. rufa

Binomial name
- Finschia rufa Warb.

Species of tree endemic to Papua New Guinea

Finschia rufa is a species of tree in the family Proteaceae and is endemic to Papua New Guinea.
