= Slender leek orchid =

Slender leek orchid is a common name for several plants and may refer to:

- Prasophyllum gracillimum
- Prasophyllum parviflorum
