= Leioproctus impolitus =

Scientific classification
- Kingdom: Animalia
- Phylum: Arthropoda
- Clade: Pancrustacea
- Class: Insecta
- Order: Hymenoptera
- Family: Colletidae
- Genus: Leioproctus
- Species: L. impolitus

Binomial name
- Leioproctus impolitus Batley, 2025

Species of bee

Leioproctus impolitus, or Leioproctus (Euryglossidia) impolitus, is a species of bee in the family Colletidae and subfamily Colletinae. It is endemic to Australia. It was described by entomologist Michael Batley in 2025.

== Etymology ==
The specific epithet impolitus (Latin: "rough") is an anatomical reference to the integumental sculpture.

== Description ==
The female body length is 5.0 mm, male body length 4.8 mm. Integumental colouration is mainly black with brown markings. The hair is white to brown.

== Distribution and habitat ==
The species occurs in south-west Western Australia. The type locality is Orange Grove, Perth.

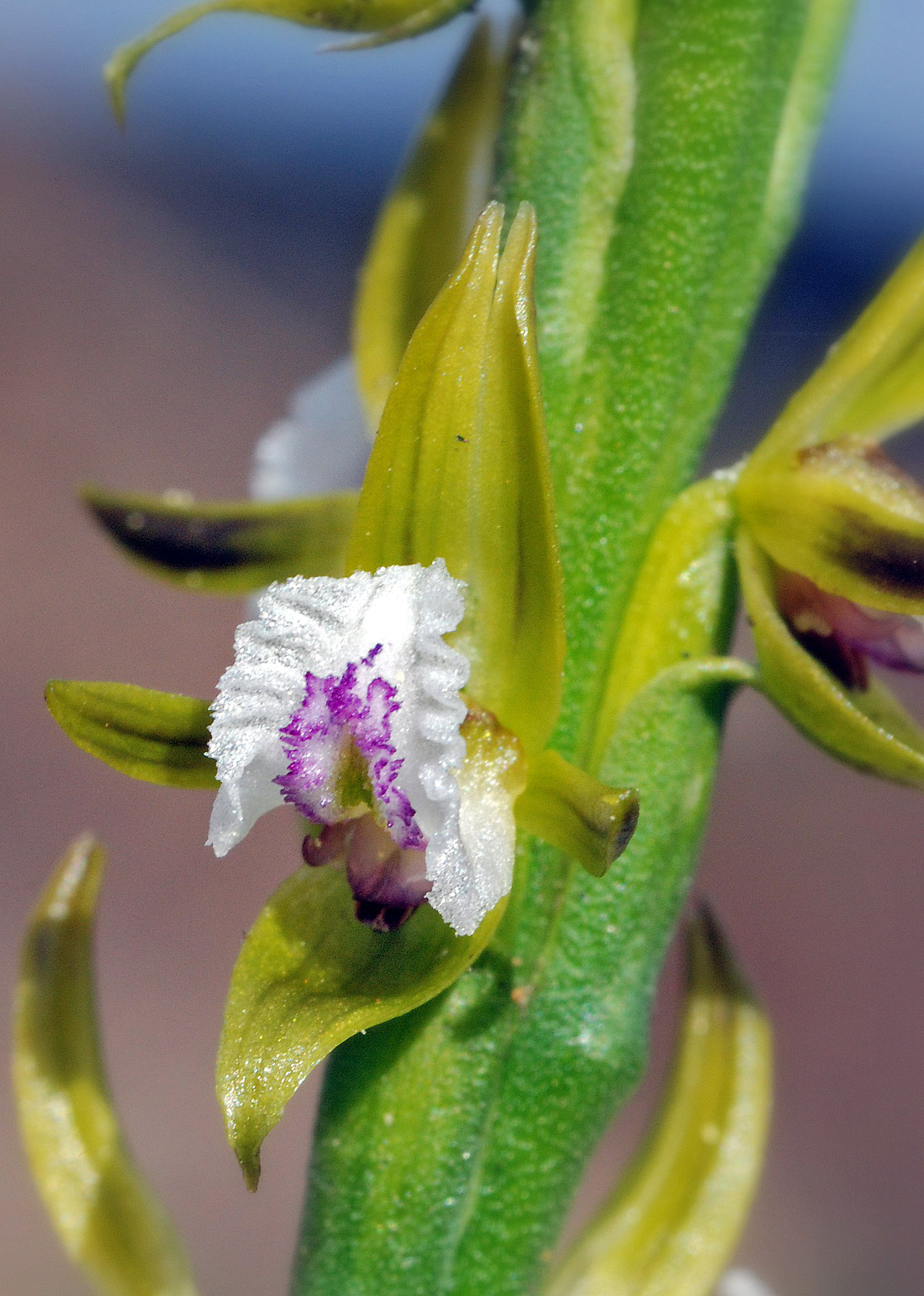
Flower of Prasophyllum fimbria (fringed leek orchid), a forage plant of the bees

== Behaviour ==
The adults are flying mellivores. Flowering plants visited by the bees include Prasophyllum fimbria and Petrophile striata.

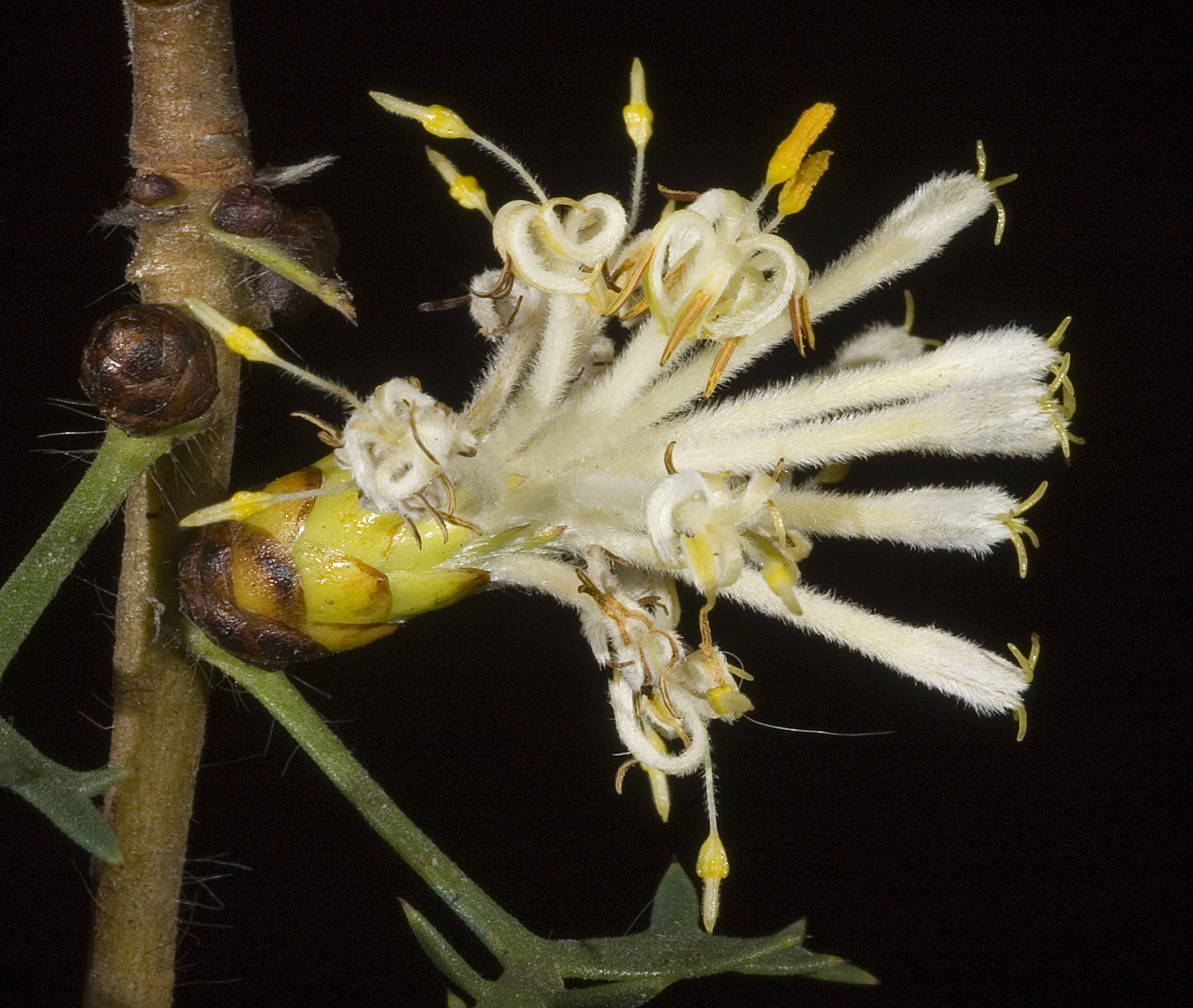
Flowers of Petrophile striata, a forage plant of the bees
