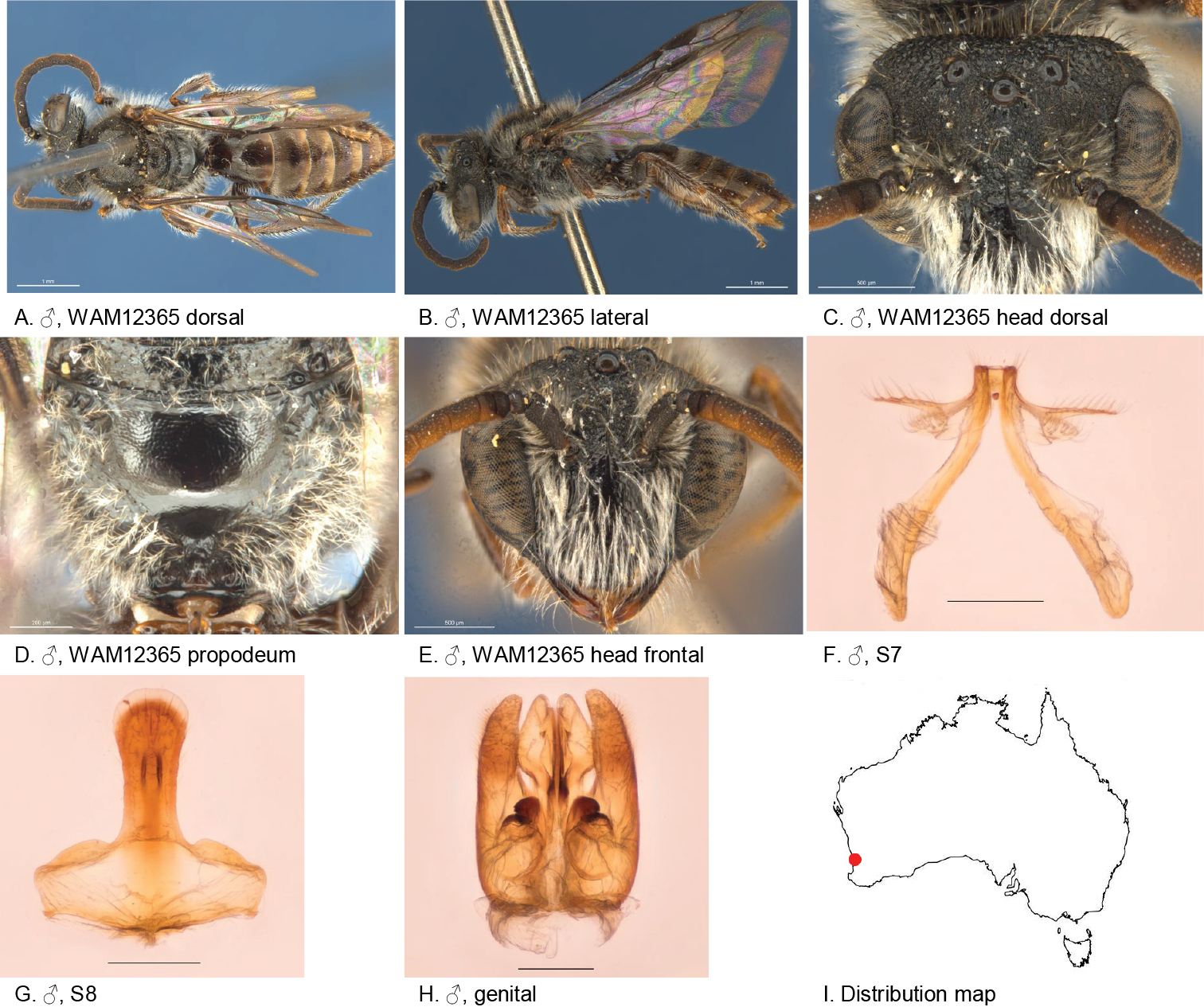
- Male holotype

Scientific classification
- Kingdom: Animalia
- Phylum: Arthropoda
- Clade: Pancrustacea
- Class: Insecta
- Order: Hymenoptera
- Family: Colletidae
- Genus: Leioproctus
- Species: L. aratus

Binomial name
- Leioproctus aratus Leijs 2018

= Leioproctus aratus =

Species of bee

Leioproctus aratus, or Leioproctus (Colletellus) aratus, is a species of bee in the family Colletidae and subfamily Colletinae. It is endemic to Australia. It was described by entomologist Remko Leijs in 2018.

== Etymology ==
The specific epithet aratus is an anatomical reference to the coarse pit-reticulate sculpture on the head.

== Description ==
The male holotype body length is 6 mm, head width 1.85 mm. Integumental colouration is mainly black and brown. The hair is white to brown.

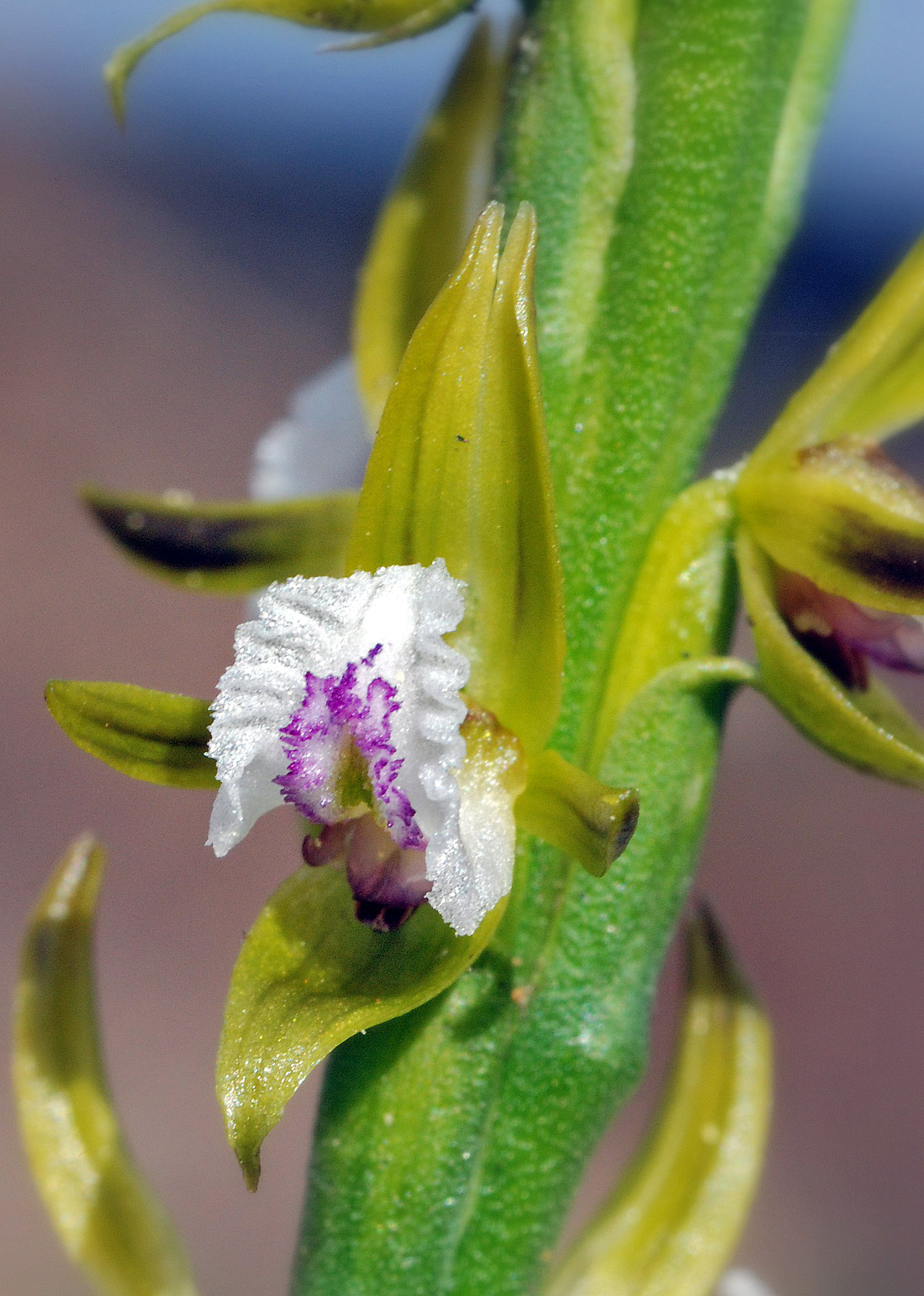
Prasophyllum fimbria (fringed leek orchid), a forage plant of the bees

== Distribution and habitat ==
The species occurs in south-west Western Australia. The type locality is Orange Grove, Perth.

== Behaviour ==
The adults are flying mellivores. Flowering plants visited by the bees include Prasophyllum fimbria.
