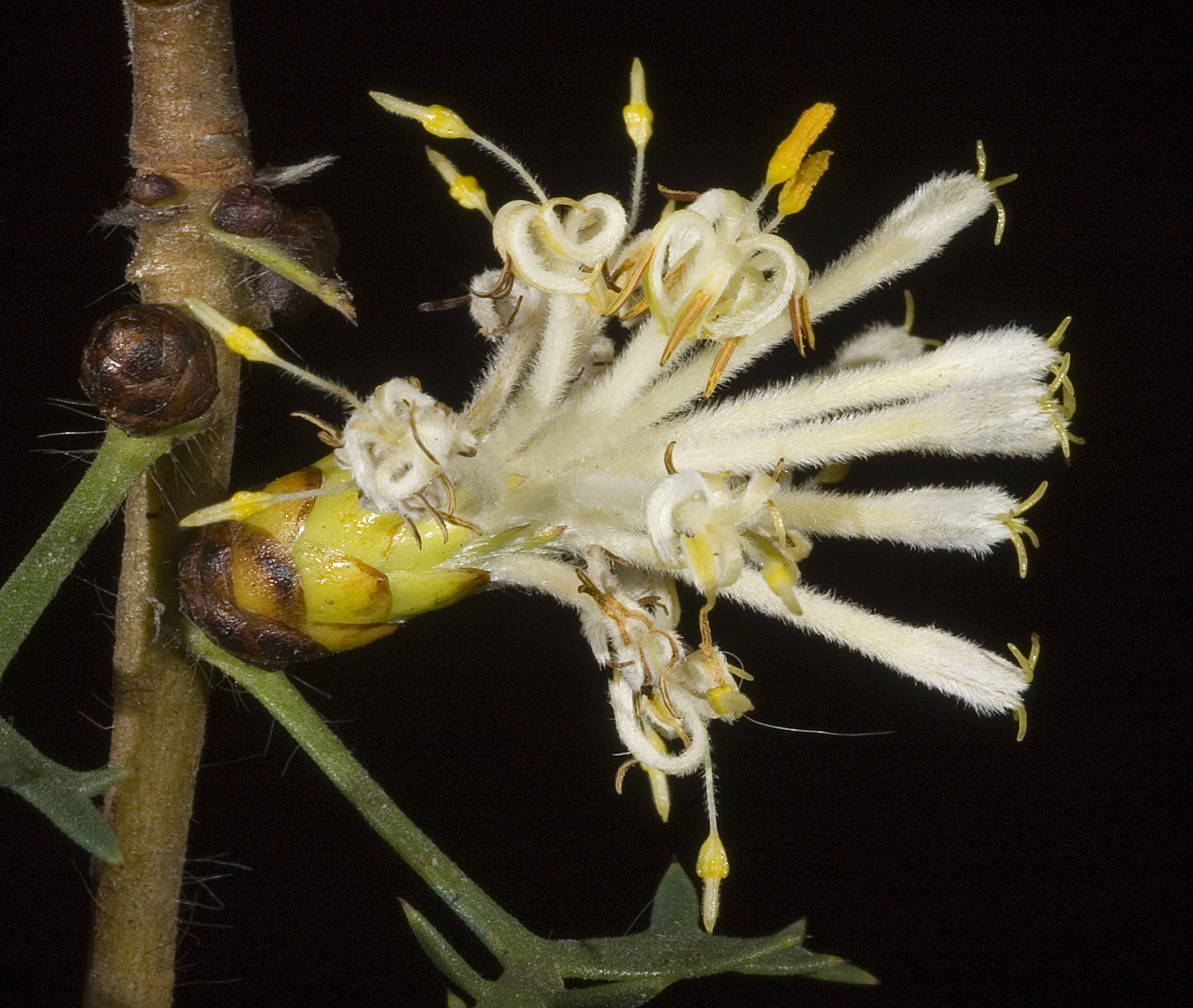

Scientific classification
- Kingdom: Plantae
- Clade: Tracheophytes
- Clade: Angiosperms
- Clade: Eudicots
- Order: Proteales
- Family: Proteaceae
- Genus: Petrophile
- Species: P. striata

Binomial name
- Petrophile striata R.Br.

Synonyms
- Petrophila dasyclada Gand. orth. var.; Petrophila stylaris Gand. orth. var.; Petrophile dasyclada Gand.; Petrophile stylaris Gand.

= Petrophile striata =

Species of shrub endemic to Western Australia

Petrophile striata is a species of flowering plant in the family Proteaceae and is endemic to the south-west of Western Australia. It is a shrub with pinnate or bipinnate, striated, sharply-pointed leaves, and oval heads of silky-hairy yellow, creamy-yellow or cream-coloured flowers.

== Description ==
Petrophile striata is a sometimes prostrate shrub that typically grows to a height of 0.2–1 m (7.9 in – 3 ft 3.4 in) and has branchlets and leaves that are hairy when young but become glabrous with age. The leaves are pinnate or bipinnate, 35–75 mm (1.4–3.0 in) long on a petiole 10–22 mm (0.39–0.87 in) long and striated, the pinnae up to 10 mm (0.39 in) long, 1–3 mm (0.039–0.118 in) wide and sharply-pointed. The flowers are arranged in leaf axils in sessile, sometimes clustered, oval heads 5–6 mm (0.20–0.24 in) long, with overlapping egg-shaped involucral bracts at the base. The flowers are 15–20 mm (0.59–0.79 in) long, yellow, creamy-yellow or cream-coloured and silky-hairy. Flowering occurs from August to December and the fruit is a nut, fused with others in an oval head up to 16 mm (0.63 in) in diameter.

== Taxonomy ==
Petrophile striata was first formally described in 1830 by Robert Brown in the Supplementum to his Prodromus Florae Novae Hollandiae et Insulae Van Diemen from material collected by Charles Fraser near the Swan River in 1826. The specific epithet (striata) refers to the leaves.

== Distribution and habitat ==
Petrophile striata grows in woodland and shrubland in sandy-clay-gravel soils over laterite or granite and is found from Eneabba to Wagin as well as on the Darling Range and nearby coastal plain.

== Conservation status ==
This petrophile is classified as "not threatened" by the Western Australian Government Department of Parks and Wildlife.
