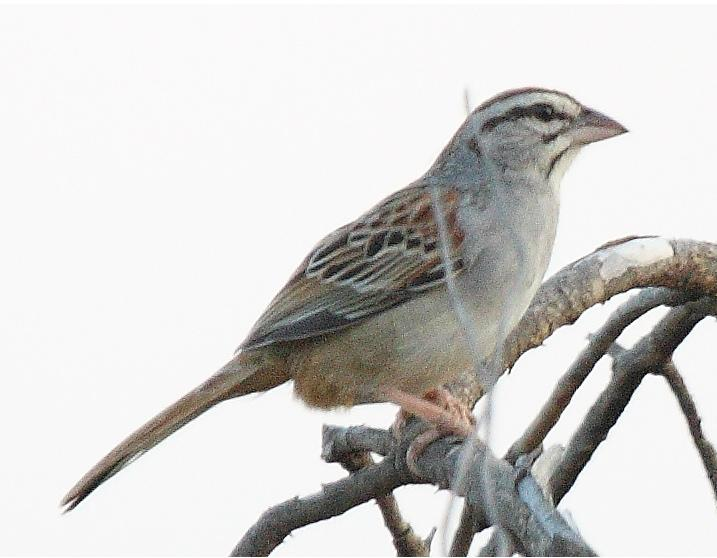

Conservation status
- Near Threatened (IUCN 3.1)

Scientific classification
- Kingdom: Animalia
- Phylum: Chordata
- Class: Aves
- Order: Passeriformes
- Family: Passerellidae
- Genus: Peucaea
- Species: P. sumichrasti

Binomial name
- Peucaea sumichrasti (Lawrence, 1871)

Synonyms
- See text

= Cinnamon-tailed sparrow =

Species of bird

The cinnamon-tailed sparrow (Peucaea sumichrasti) is a Near Threatened species of bird in the family Passerellidae, the New World sparrows. It is endemic to Mexico.

== Taxonomy and systematics ==
The cinnamon-tailed sparrow was formally described in 1871 with the binomial Haemophila sumichrasti. The specific epithet honors François Sumichrast, who collected the type specimen. It has sometimes been called "Sumichrast's sparrow". In the early twentieth century the species was reassigned to genus Aimophila. The genus Peucaea had earlier been merged into Aimophila; in 2010 taxonomic systems began restoring Peucaea to generic status and moved the cinnamon-tailed sparrow and several other species from Aimophila to it.

The cinnamon-tailed sparrow is monotypic.

== Description ==
The cinnamon-tailed sparrow is 14.5 to 16.5 cm (5.7 to 6.5 in) long and weighs 23 to 30 g (0.81 to 1.1 oz). The sexes have the same plumage. Adults have a chesnut brown crown with a thin gray stripe down its middle and black streaks on the brown. Their nape and most of their face are light gray with black lores, a wide whitish supercilium, a white crescent below the eye, and a dark brown stripe behind the eye. Their back and scapulars are light brown to grayish brown with wide black streaks. Their uppertail coverts and tail are cinnamon. Their lesser wing coverts are cinnamon rufous and the median and greater coverts blackish brown with pale rufous edges. Their flight feathers are dark brown with pale rufous edges. Their chin and throat are white with two black stripes on the latter. The center of their breast is whitish, their sides light gray, their flanks grayish buff, and their undertail coverts light rufous. They have a deep brown or brownish red iris, a dark gray maxilla, a horn-pink mandible, and brownish to pink legs and feet.

== Distribution and habitat ==
The cinnamon-tailed sparrow is found on the Pacific side of southern Mexico's Isthmus of Tehuantepec from the Tehuantepec River basin in eastern Oaxaca to far southwestern Chiapas. It inhabits arid scrublands and the edges of tropical thorn forest. In elevation it ranges from sea level to 950 m (3,100 ft).

== Behavior ==
=== Movement ===
The cinnamon-tailed sparrow is a year-round resident.

=== Feeding ===
The cinnamon-tailed sparrow's diet has not been studied but probably includes "seeds, small insects, spiders, fruit, and nectar ". It usually forages on the ground in pairs or small groups that are thought to be families.

=== Breeding ===
The cinnamon-tailed sparrow's breeding season apparently spans from June to September. Some pairs may raise two broods in a season. The nest and eggs have not been described. The usual clutch, incubation period, time to fledging, and details of parental care are not known.

=== Vocalization ===
The cinnamon-tailed sparrow's song is "a short, chipping series, often with 1-3 introductory notes, bzz, bzz, bzz t-chip-ichip tip-i-see, or tik ssiu chi-chi-chit, or spi spi speen chi-chi-chi-chi, etc. the 2nd part louder and fuller". Its calls are "high, slightly sharp, clear notes, tsit and tsi-tsit, a buzzier ssir or zzri, and fairly loud, excited, rapid, liquid tinkling, at times rhythmic (duetting pairs?)".

== Status ==
The IUCN originally in 1988 assessed the cinnamon-tailed sparrow as being of Least Concern but since 1994 as Near Threatened. It has a small range; its estimated population of at least 20,000 mature individuals is believed to be stable. "The Pan-American Highway has led to fragmentation of habitat within its restricted range." Specific threats include "expansion of agave plantations for production of mezcal, extensive increases in cattle pastures, new sorghum fields, growing industrial complexes linked to the petroleum port of Salina Cruz, and of particular concern, commercial-scale wind energy developments that are further fragmenting and reducing native habitats". It is considered fairly common to common.
