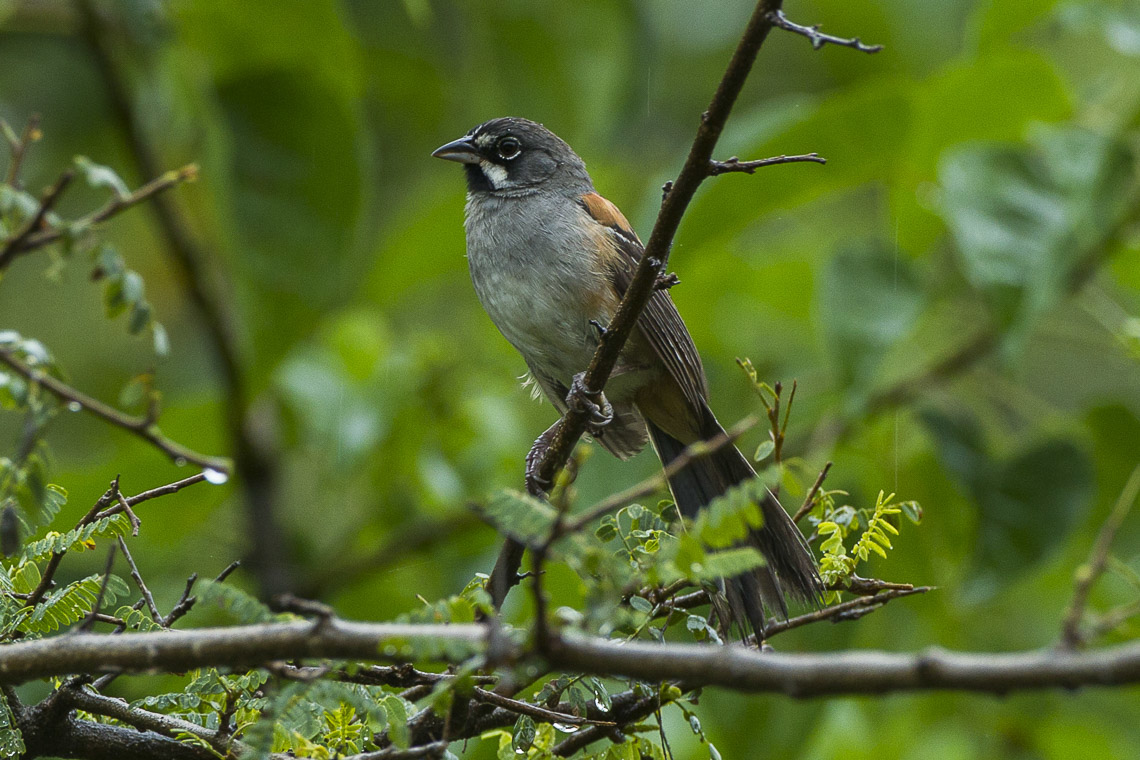

Conservation status
- Least Concern (IUCN 3.1)

Scientific classification
- Kingdom: Animalia
- Phylum: Chordata
- Class: Aves
- Order: Passeriformes
- Family: Passerellidae
- Genus: Peucaea
- Species: P. mystacalis

Binomial name
- Peucaea mystacalis (Hartlaub, 1852)

Synonyms
- See text

= Bridled sparrow =

Species of bird

The bridled sparrow (Peucaea mystacalis) is a species of bird in the family Passerellidae, the New World sparrows. It is endemic to Mexico.

== Taxonomy and systematics ==
The bridled sparrow was formally described in 1852 with the binomial Zonotrichia mystacalis. During the rest of the nineteenth century it was reassigned to several genera and then in the early twentieth to genus Aimophila. Genus Peucaea had earlier been merged into Aimophila; in 2010 taxonomic systems began restoring Peucaea to generic status and moved the bridled sparrow and several other species from Aimophila to it.

The bridled sparrow is monotypic.

== Description ==
The bridled sparrow is 14 to 16.5 cm (5.5 to 6.5 in) long and weighs about 20 to 26 g (0.71 to 0.92 oz). The sexes have the same plumage. Adults have a grayish crown and nape with dusky streaks. Their lores are black with a white spot above them. Their face is dull brownish gray or dusky with a white "moustache" stripe. Their back is brown with black streaks and their scapulars cinnamon rufous. Their rump is also cinnamon rufous. Their tail is dusky with paler feather edges. Their wings are dull black or dusky with paler feather edges. Their middle and greater wing coverts have white tips that show as two wing bars. Their chin is white and their throat black. Their breast is light olive gray or dull ash gray, their belly dull white, and their flanks and undertail coverts cinnamon buff. They have a brown iris, a black maxilla, a pale bluish gray mandible, and pale pinkish or light brown legs and feet. Juveniles have a light grayish brown crown and nape with dusky streaks. Their loral spot, moustache, and wing bars are yellowish or buffy rather than white. The center of their throat is whitish with dusky flecks. Their breast is dull whitish with dusky streaks.

== Distribution and habitat ==
The bridled sparrow is found primarily in south-central Mexico's southern Puebla and northern Oaxaca states. It is also found locally in Morelos and Veracruz. It primarily inhabits arid montane scrublands including thorn forest. It also is found in nearby oak scrub and overgrown clearings. In elevation it ranges between 900 and 1,900 m (3,000 and 6,200 ft).

== Behavior ==
=== Movement ===
The bridled sparrow is a year-round resident.

=== Feeding ===
The bridled sparrow's diet has not been studied. It apparently includes seeds, insects, spiders, fruit, and nectar. It usually forages on and near the ground, in pairs or small groups.

=== Breeding ===
The bridled sparrow's breeding season has not been fully defined but apparently spans at least July to October. Its nest is a cup made from grass lined with rootlets and is typically built in a shrub within about 1 m (3 ft) of the ground. Clutches of up to three eggs have been found; the eggs are plain white or bluish white. The incubation period, time to fledging, and details of parental care are not known.

=== Vocalization ===
The bridled sparrow's song is "a series of hesitant, slightly sneezy, sharp, sweet chips, in full song breaking into an excited liquid chatter: w-sik', w-sik' w-sik', w-sik' w-sik' ... or w-syu', w-syu' .... run into an accelerating, rapid seeu seeuseeuseeuseeuseeu". Its calls include "a sharp, liquid suik; [a] thin, high, wheezy to slightly liquid twittering...a chip, evidently an alarm call; tzee; a chitter series, ...chu; chut; tut; and check".

== Status ==
The IUCN has assessed the bridled sparrow as being of Least Concern. It has a large range; its estimated population of at least 20,000 mature individuals is believed to be decreasing. No immediate threats have been identified. "No effects of human activity on Bridled Sparrow are documented, although it presumably is vulnerable to habitat degradation or loss."
