= John Schnase =

American computer scientist

John L. Schnase is an American computer scientist, whose work on the life history of Cassin's sparrow (Peucaea cassinii) resulted in an early application of computers in avian energetics modeling, currently at NASA, and an Elected Fellow of the American Association for the Advancement of Science.
