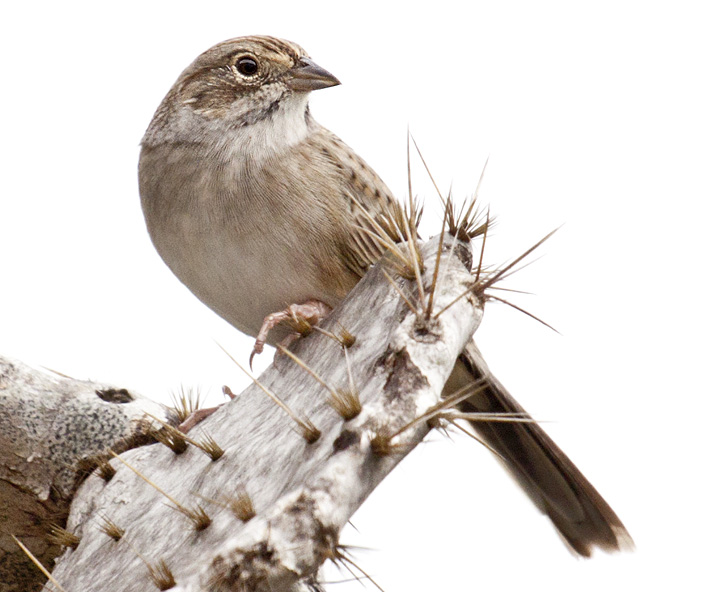
- Cassin's sparrow (Peucaea cassinii)

Scientific classification
- Kingdom: Animalia
- Phylum: Chordata
- Class: Aves
- Order: Passeriformes
- Family: Passerellidae
- Genus: Peucaea; Audubon, 1839

Type species
- Fringilla bachmani Audubon, 1833 (Note: Audubon spelled the specific epithet bachmani on the 1833 plate but bachmanii in the text published in 1834 to accompany the plate.)

Species
- See text

= Peucaea =

Genus of birds

Peucaea is a genus of American sparrows. The species in this genus used to be included in the genus Aimophila.

== Taxonomy and species ==
A molecular phylogenetic study published in 2009 found that the genus Aimophila was polyphyletic. In the resulting reorganization to create monophyletic genera, eight species were moved from Aimophila to the resurrected genus Peucaea. Peucaea had been introduced by the Franco-American ornithologist John James Audubon in 1839. The genus name is from the Ancient Greek peukē meaning "pine-tree". The type species was designated by English zoologist George Robert Gray in 1841 as Fringilla bachmani, a taxon now considered to be a subspecies of Bachman's sparrow with the trinomial name Peucaea aestivalis bachmani. Peucaea is the sister genus to Ammodramus within the family Passerellidae.

The genus contains the following eight species:

Genus Peucaea – Audubon, 1839 – eight species
Common name	Scientific name and subspecies	Range	Size and ecology	IUCN status and estimated population
Rufous-winged sparrow	Peucaea carpalis Coues, 1873 Three subspecies: P. c. carpalis (Coues, 1873): Tucson, Arizona area south to central Sonora; P. c. bangsi (Moore, RT, 1932): north-central Sonora south to northern Sinaloa; P. c. cohaerens (Moore, RT, 1946): northern and central Sinaloa	Sonoran and Sinaloan deserts, from the Tucson, Arizona area in the United States south into Mexico to northern and central Sinaloa	Size: 15 cm (6 in); 12–17 g (0.42–0.60 oz) Habitat: Sonoran and Sinaloan deserts, though shuns the driest parts; mesquite grasslands in Arizona; in Mexico also grassy thorn scrub, riparian areas (including irrigation channels) and, coastally, mangroves Diet: Seeds and larval and adult arthropods, with more seeds in the non-breeding season; mostly on the ground, in summer also in shady shrubs; takes most food by gleaning, occasionally hawking insects	LC Decreasing; about 200,000 mature individuals
Cinnamon-tailed sparrow	Peucaea sumichrasti (Lawrence, 1871)	Pacific side of southern Mexico's Isthmus of Tehuantepec, from the Tehuantepec River basin in eastern Oaxaca to far southwestern Chiapas	Size: 14.5–16.5 cm (5.7–6.5 in); 23–30 g (0.81–1.1 oz) Habitat: Arid scrublands and edges of tropical thorn forest, from sea level to 950 m (3,100 ft) Diet: Diet not studied but probably seeds, small insects, spiders, fruit and nectar; usually forages on the ground in pairs or small groups	NT Stable; at least 20,000 mature individuals
Stripe-headed sparrow	Peucaea ruficauda (Bonaparte, 1853) Four subspecies: P. r. acuminata (Salvin & Godman, 1886): Pacific slope of Mexico from southern Durango and southern Zacatecas south to southeastern Guerrero, and east to Morelos and southern Puebla; P. r. lawrencii (Salvin & Godman, 1886): southern Mexico on the southern edge of the Isthmus of Tehuantepec in Oaxaca and extreme western Chiapas; P. r. connectens (Griscom, 1930): watershed of the Motagua River in eastern Guatemala; P. r. ruficauda (Bonaparte, 1853): southern Guatemala south across El Salvador, western Honduras and western Nicaragua into northwestern Costa Rica to central Puntarenas Province	Disjunct distribution from Mexico to Costa Rica: Pacific slope of Mexico, southern edge of the Isthmus of Tehuantepec, Motagua River watershed in eastern Guatemala, and southern Guatemala south across El Salvador, western Honduras and western Nicaragua into northwestern Costa Rica	Size: 15–19.5 cm (5.9–7.7 in); 25–45 g (0.88–1.6 oz) Habitat: Generally open, mostly dry landscapes: dry grasslands with scattered leguminous trees, rocky hillsides, brushy road and field edges, hedgerows, and deciduous forest in the tropical and lower subtropical zones; sea level to 1,500 m (4,900 ft) Diet: Seeds, insects, spiders and fruits; forages mostly on the ground and otherwise near it in vegetation; usually in small groups of up to about 7, sometimes larger flocks	LC Stable; about 500,000 mature individuals
Black-chested sparrow	Peucaea humeralis (Cabanis, 1851)	Somewhat inland in southwestern Mexico, from southern Jalisco and Colima south to Guerrero and southwestern Oaxaca, and east to Morelos and Puebla	Size: 15–15.5 cm (5.9–6.1 in); 18–28 g (0.63–0.99 oz) Habitat: Arid lowland and montane scrub forest and thorn forest in the tropical and lower subtropical zones; sources differ on elevation: sea level or 300 m (1,000 ft) up to 1,500 m (4,900 ft) Diet: Diet not studied; in breeding season apparently mostly larval and adult insects with some seeds and fruit; forages singly or in pairs, mostly at the tops of trees by gleaning while perched and hovering	LC Decreasing; at least 20,000 mature individuals
Bridled sparrow	Peucaea mystacalis (Hartlaub, 1852)	Primarily south-central Mexico's southern Puebla and northern Oaxaca; locally in Morelos and Veracruz	Size: 14–16.5 cm (5.5–6.5 in); 20–26 g (0.71–0.92 oz) Habitat: Arid montane scrublands including thorn forest, also nearby oak scrub and overgrown clearings; 900–1,900 m (3,000–6,200 ft) Diet: Diet not studied; apparently seeds, insects, spiders, fruit and nectar; usually forages on and near the ground, in pairs or small groups	LC Decreasing; at least 20,000 mature individuals
Botteri's sparrow	Peucaea botterii (Sclater, 1858) Eight subspecies: P. b. arizonae (Ridgway, 1873): southeastern Arizona and southwestern New Mexico south in Mexico to Morelos; P. b. texana (Phillips, AR, 1943): extreme southern Texas south along the Gulf of Mexico to southern Tamaulipas and inland to northern Coahuila; P. b. goldmani (Phillips, AR, 1943): Pacific slope of Mexico from southern Sonora south to southern Nayarit; P. b. botterii (Sclater, PL, 1858): central highlands of Mexico from central Durango, Zacatecas and Nuevo León south to Jalisco, Oaxaca and southern Veracruz; P. b. petenica (Salvin, 1863): Gulf slope from central Veracruz east into the Yucatán Peninsula and south to northern Chiapas, Belize and northern Guatemala; P. b. spadiconigrescens (Howell, TR, 1965): eastern Honduras and northeastern Nicaragua; P. b. vantynei (Webster, JD, 1959): northwestern Guatemala; P. b. vulcanica (Miller, W & Griscom, 1925): Pacific slope in western Nicaragua and northwestern Costa Rica's Cordillera de Guanacaste	Disjunct distribution from the southwestern United States (southeastern Arizona, southwestern New Mexico, southern Texas) south through Mexico to Belize, Guatemala, Honduras, Nicaragua and northwestern Costa Rica; populations in the southern US and far northern Mexico are migratory	Size: 15–17 cm (5.9–6.7 in); 17–26 g (0.60–0.92 oz) Habitat: Northern subspecies: temperate and desert grasslands, savanna, oak woodlands and coastal prairie, sea level to 2,000 m (6,600 ft); southern subspecies also pine forest and lowland pine savanna Diet: Mostly insects and also seeds; primarily on the ground; in breeding season forages mostly alone, in pairs and in family groups	LC Stable; about 170,000 mature individuals
Cassin's sparrow	Peucaea cassinii (Woodhouse, 1852)	Western Nebraska to north-central Mexico; nomadic	Size: 5–6 in (13–15 cm) Habitat: Brushy grassland; requires both a grass component (usually short grass) and a shrub component Diet: Mostly or entirely on the ground; summer diet mainly insects (grasshoppers, caterpillars, beetles); seeds of weeds and grasses in fall and winter	LC
Bachman's sparrow	Peucaea aestivalis (Lichtenstein, MHC, 1823) Three subspecies: P. a. aestivalis: breeds furthest east, from southeast South Carolina to peninsular Florida; P. a. bachmani: west of P. a. aestivalis to Mississippi and north to Kentucky; P. a. illinoensis: westernmost region of the species' range	Southeastern United States, from central peninsular Florida north to southeastern North Carolina and west through portions of Tennessee, Kentucky and Missouri to eastern Oklahoma and eastern Texas	Size: 12.2–16.2 cm (4.8–6.4 in); 18.4–23 g (0.65–0.81 oz) Habitat: Open pine forests, with a dense layer of ground vegetation and open mid-stories with scattered shrubs and saplings, including young clearcuts Diet: Forages on the ground for plant seeds and arthropods; mainly granivorous	NT Declining since 1966
