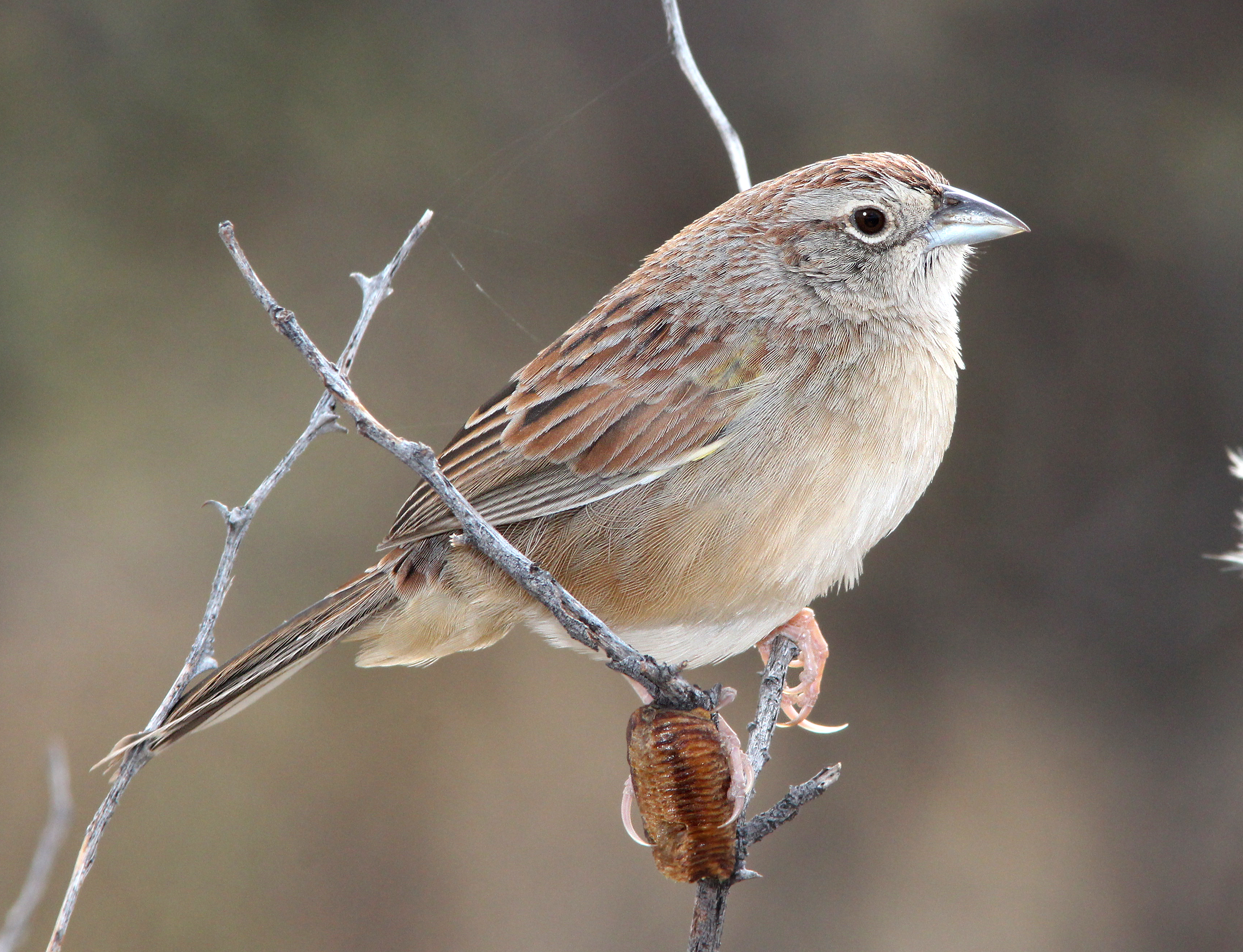

Conservation status
- Least Concern (IUCN 3.1)

Scientific classification
- Kingdom: Animalia
- Phylum: Chordata
- Class: Aves
- Order: Passeriformes
- Family: Passerellidae
- Genus: Peucaea
- Species: P. botterii

Binomial name
- Peucaea botterii (Sclater, PL, 1858)

Synonyms
- See text

= Botteri's sparrow =

Species of bird

Botteri's sparrow (Peucaea botterii) is a species of bird in the family Passerellidae, the New World sparrows. It is found from the southwestern United States to Costa Rica.

== Taxonomy and systematics ==
The Botteri's sparrow was formally described in 1858 with the binomial Zonotrichia botterii. Its specific epithet and eventual English name honor Matteo Botteri, who collected the type specimen. It was later reassigned to genus Aimophila. Genus Peucaea had earlier been merged into Aimophila; in 2010 taxonomic systems began restoring Peucaea to generic status and moved Botteri's sparrow and several other species from Aimophila to it.

The further taxonomy of Botteri's sparrow is unsettled. The IOC and AviList assign it these eight subspecies:

- P. b. arizonae Ridgway, 1873
- P. b. texana (Phillips, AR, 1943)
- P. b. goldmani (Phillips, AR, 1943)
- P. b. botterii (Sclater, PL, 1858)
- P. b. petenica (Salvin, 1863)
- P. b. spadiconigrescens (Howell, TR, 1965)
- P. b. vantynei (Webster, JD, 1959)
- P. b. vulcanica (Miller, W & Griscom, 1925)

However, as of late 2025 the Clements taxonomy and BirdLife International's Handbook of the Birds of the World add a ninth, P. b. mexicana (Lawrence, 1867) that the other systems include within the nominate subspecies P. b. botterii. Clements subdivides the species into the boterii group (P. b. arizonae through P. b. botterii in the list above plus P. b. mexicana) and the petenica group (the other four subspecies).

This article follows the eight-subspecies model.

== Description ==
Botteri's sparrow is about 15 to 17 cm (5.9 to 6.7 in) long and weighs 17 to 26 g (0.60 to 0.92 oz). The sexes have the same plumage. Adults of the nominate subspecies have a reddish brown crown, pale lores, a pale supercilium, and a rusty streak behind the eye on an otherwise gray face. Their upperparts are reddish brown with thin black streaks (wider in the center of the back) and gray edges on the feathers. Their tail is dusky with lighter feather edges and a dark "ladder-shaped" pattern on the middle feathers. Their wings are brown; their greater coverts and most of their secondaries have wide rusty edges. Their chin and throat are rusty to deep buff, their breast grayish buff, their belly buff to whitish, and their sides, flanks, and undertail coverts buffy.

The other subspecies of Botteri's sparrow differ from the nominate and each other thus:

- P. b. arizonae: paler head and back than nominate and pale ochraceous belly
- P. b. texana: paler and grayer upperparts and whiter belly than nominate
- P. b. goldmani: smaller than nominate; darker and redder back, darker more buff-brown or gray-brown breast and flanks
- P. b. petenica: smaller than nominate; much black and little red on the back, and whiter belly
- P. b. spadiconigrescens: upperparts color between nominate and petenica
- P. b. vantynei: upperparts color between nominate and petenica, and brownish belly
- P. b. vulcanica: upperpart blacker than vantynei but less than nominate, and dusky underparts

All subspecies have a brown iris, a dusky maxilla, a bluish mandible, and pinkish legs and feet.

== Distribution and habitat ==
Botteri's sparrow has a disjunct distribution. The subspecies are found thus:

- P. b. arizonae: southeastern Arizona and southwestern New Mexico in the U. S. south in Mexico to Morelos
- P. b. texana: extreme southern Texas in the U. S. south along Gulf of Mexico to southern Tamaulipas and inland to northern Coahuila
- P. b. goldmani: Pacific slope of Mexico from southern Sonora south to southern Nayarit
- P. b. botterii: central highlands of Mexico from central Durango, Zacatecas, and Nuevo León south to Jalisco, Oaxaca, and southern Veracruz
- P. b. petenica: Gulf slope from central Veracruz east into Yucatán Peninsula and south to northern Chiapas, Belize, and northern Guatemala
- P. b. spadiconigrescens: separate from others in eastern Honduras and northeastern Nicaragua
- P. b. vantynei: separate from others in northwestern Guatemala
- P. b. vulcanica: separate from others on Pacific slope in western Nicaragua and northwestern Costa Rica's Cordillera de Guanacaste

The more northerly botterii group of Botteri's sparrow subspecies inhabits temperate and desert grasslands, savanna, oak woodlands, and coastal prairie at elevations from sea level to 2,000 m (6,600 ft). The southerly petenica group inhabits the same landscape types as the botterii group and also pine forest and lowland pine savanna. In northern Central America this group ranges from sea level to 1,500 m (4,900 ft) and in Costa Rica occurs between 500 and 1,100 m (1,600 and 3,600 ft).

Botteri's sparrow was not found in Arizona between the 1890s and the mid-20th century due to excessive grazing of livestock; now it is locally common in its Arizona range due to recovery of vegetation. Juvenile birds apparently need dense vegetation to hide in during fledging; the uncommon native sacaton grass Sporobolus wrightii is preferred, but stands of introduced non-native Lehmann lovegrass (Eragrostis lehmanniana) and Boer lovegrass (E. curvula var. conferta) are also successfully utilized, though at lower population densities.

== Behavior ==
=== Movement ===
Botteri's sparrow is a year-round resident in most of its range. However, the populations in the southern U. S. and adjoining far northern Mexico are migratory. They travel south into the year-round range in September and October and return in May. Their exact routes and overwintering areas are not known.

=== Feeding ===
Most data on the diet of Botteri's sparrow come from Arizona and Texas. There it feeds mostly on insects and also seeds. During the breeding season it forages mostly alone, in pairs, and in family groups. Larger flocks may congregate before fall migration. It primarily feeds on the ground.

=== Breeding ===
The data on the breeding biology of Botteri's sparrow are mostly from Arizona and Texas. There it breeds during the summer rainy season of July to September. Its nest is a cup made from leaves and grass lined with fine grass; it has an entryway made from matted grasses. The nests are typically on the ground concealed under an overhanging clump of grass. Clutches in Arizona range from two to four eggs and those in Texas are three to five. The eggs are plain white. Females alone incubate, at one nest for about 12 days. Fledging occurs about 10 days after hatch. Females alone brood nestlings but both parents provision them.

=== Vocalization ===
Only male Botteri's sparrows sing, a "complex, repetitive pattern". During the breeding season they sing from a perch or in flight. One description is "up to 7 short notes, followed by a trill of increasing tempo, then usually concluded by 1–2 phrases of 1–2 notes". A rendering from northern Central America is "tseet-tseet-pwi'i'i't-pweet-pweet-teu'teu'teu'teu'tuetuetuetue". Both sexes make calls, some of which are a chitter, a churr, and a doubled tsip.

== Status ==
The IUCN has assessed Botteri's sparrow as being of Least Concern. It has a very large range; its estimated population of 170,000 mature individuals is believed to be stable. No immediate threats have been identified.
