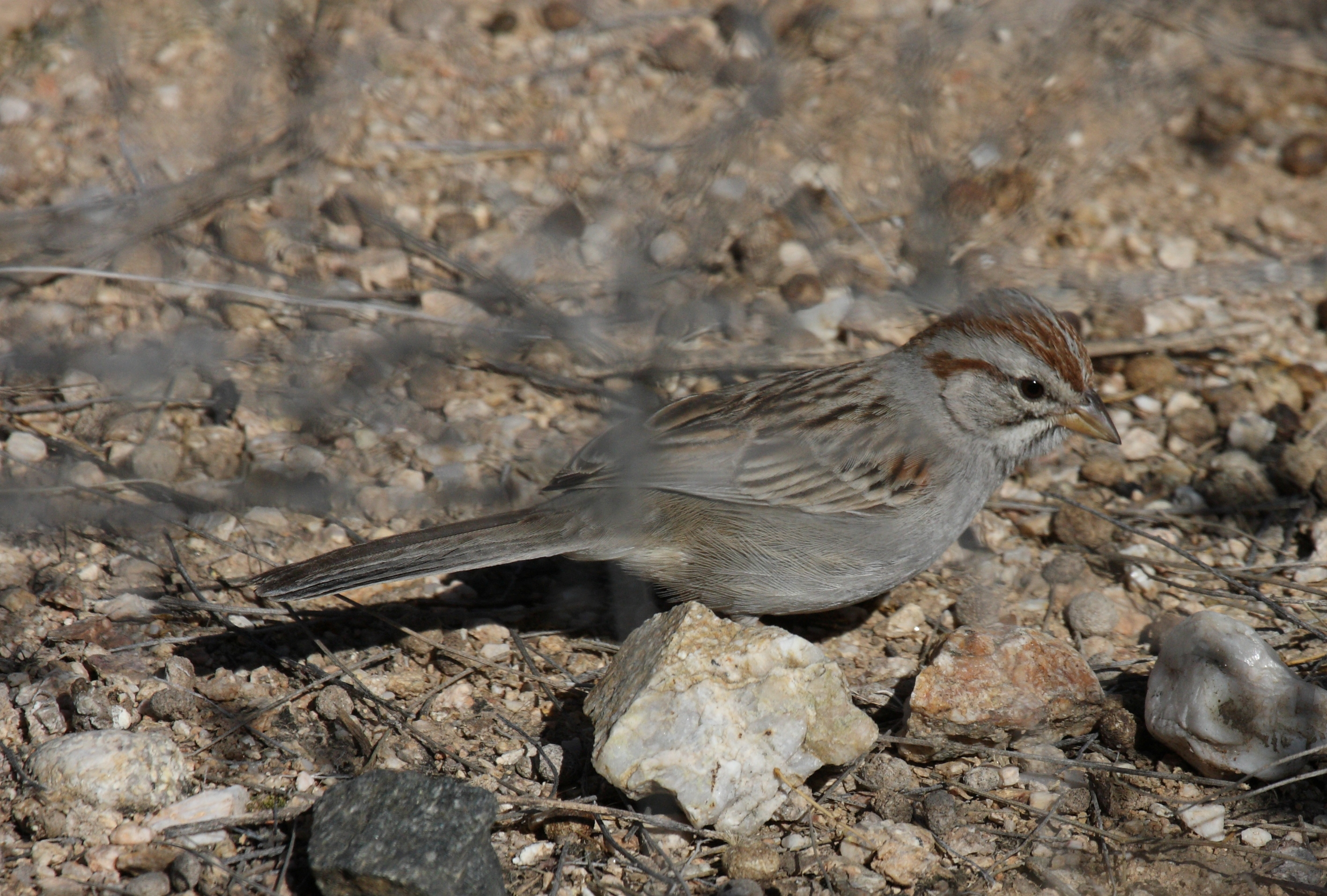

Conservation status
- Least Concern (IUCN 3.1)

Scientific classification
- Kingdom: Animalia
- Phylum: Chordata
- Class: Aves
- Order: Passeriformes
- Family: Passerellidae
- Genus: Peucaea
- Species: P. carpalis

Binomial name
- Peucaea carpalis Coues, 1873

Synonyms
- See text

= Rufous-winged sparrow =

Species of bird

The rufous-winged sparrow (Peucaea carpalis) is a species of bird in the family Passerellidae, the New World sparrows. It is found in Mexico and the United States.

== Taxonomy and systematics ==
The rufous-winged sparrow was formally described in 1873 with its current binomial Peucaea carpalis. Genus Peucaea was later merged into genus Aimophila that had been erected in 1837. In 2010 taxonomic systems began restoring Peucaea to generic status and moved several species from Aimophila to it.

The rufous-winged sparrow has three subspecies, the nominate P. c. carpalis (Coues, 1873), P. c. bangsi (Moore, RT, 1932), and P. c. cohaerens (Moore, RT, 1946).

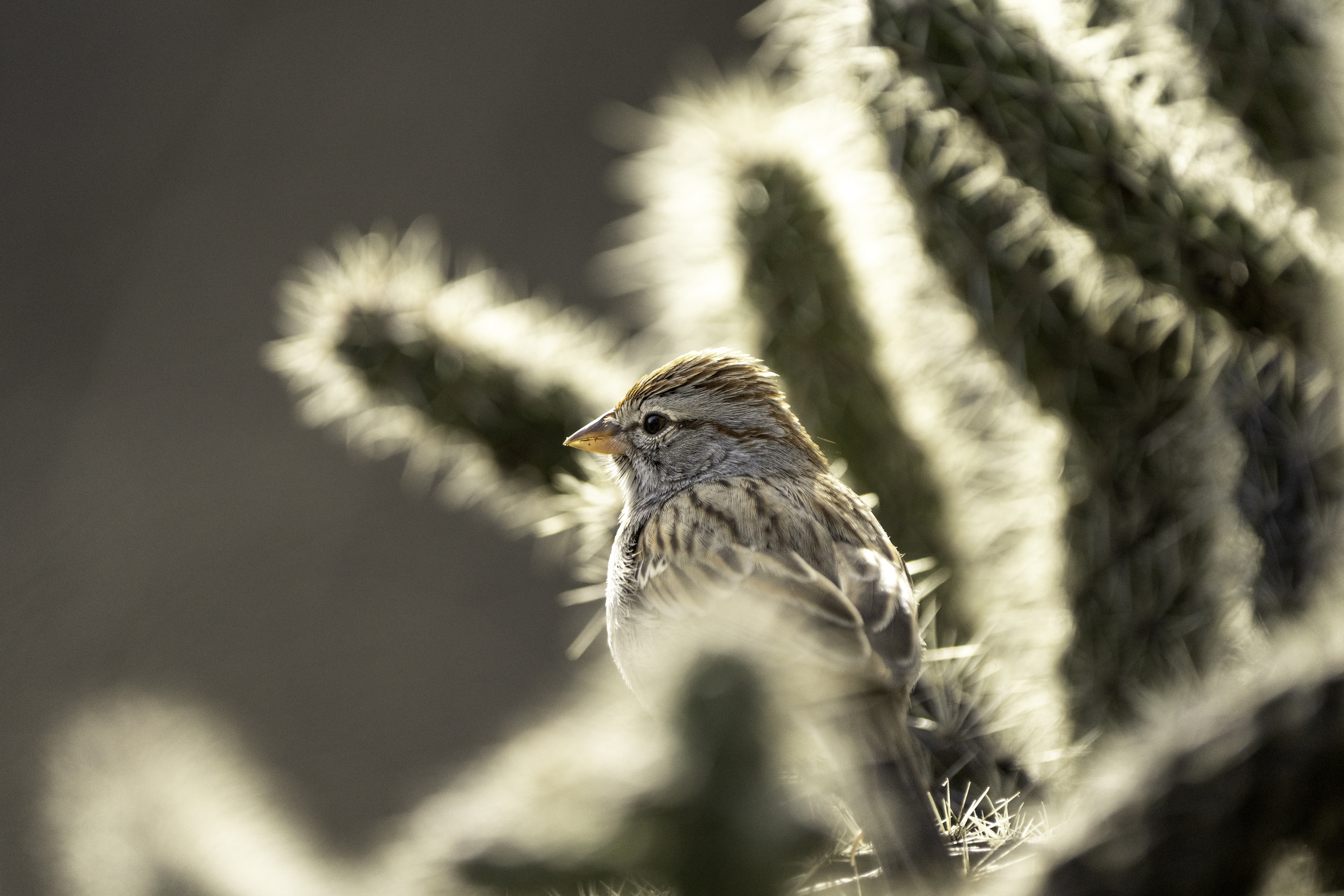
Rufous-winged sparrow in Pima County, Arizona

== Description ==
The rufous-winged sparrow is about 15 cm (6 in) long and weighs about 12 to 17 g (0.42 to 0.60 oz). The sexes have the same plumage. Adults of the nominate subspecies have two wide rufous streaks with a thin grayish line between them on the crown. They have whitish lores that become a wide grayish supercilium, a indistinct whitish eye-ring, a rufous stripe behind the eye, and grayish ear coverts with a black stripe below them. Their nape has a grayish collar that the rufous streaks intrude into. Their upperparts are brownish gray with rufous-edged dark brown streaks on the back and scapulars. Their tail feathers are brown with pale gray edges. Their wing's lesser coverts are the cinnamon-rufous that gives the species its English name. The median and greater coverts are dark brown with wide buff edges and buffy white tips that form two wing bars. Their tertials are brown with wide buffy white to rufous edges; the rest of the flight feathers are brown with thin grayish buff edges on the outer webs. Their throat is whitish with two blackish stripes, their breast and vent grayish to grayish white, their flanks buffy gray or clay-colored, and their undertail coverts pale buff. Subspecies P. c. bangsi is smaller than the nominate and has a browner back. P. c. cohaerens is also smaller than the nominate. Its back and rump are darker and have a rufescent tinge. Its breast and flanks are darker and browner. All subspecies have a brown iris, a brown bill with a paler brown mandible, and light brown legs and feet.

== Distribution and habitat ==
The nominate subspecies of the rufous-winged sparrow is the northernmost. It is found from the area of Tucson, Arizona in the United States south into Mexico to central Sonora. Subspecies P. c. bangsi is found from north-central Sonora south to northern Sinaloa. P. c. cohaerens is found in northern and central Sinaloa. In Mexico the ranges extend from the eastern shore of the Gulf of California (Sea of Cortez) inland. The species is a bird of the Sonoran and Sinaloan deserts though it shuns the driest parts of them. In Arizona it occurs in mesquite grasslands. In Mexico it occurs in similar habitats and also grassy thorn scrub. It often is found in riparian areas including along irrigation channels. Coastally it also occurs in mangroves.

=== History in Arizona ===
The type specimen of the rufous-winged sparrow was collected by Charles Emil Bendire in 1872, near old Fort Lowell, Tucson, Arizona, where he described it as common. Its numbers declined and it was not found in Arizona between 1886 and 1915; numbers again increased beginning in about 1932. It is now considered "uncommon and local" in Arizona.

== Behavior ==
=== Movement ===
The rufous-winged sparrow is primarily a year-round resident though some wandering in search of food has been recorded.

=== Feeding ===
The rufous-winged sparrow feeds on seeds and larval and adult arthropods. It apparently feeds more on seeds in the non-breeding season. It mostly feeds on the ground though in summer it also takes food in shady shrubs. It takes most food by gleaning but has been observed hawking insects.

=== Breeding ===
The rufous-winged sparrow is socially monogamous and pairs mate for life. The species usually breeds during the local summer rainy season, which usually begins in early July in Arizona and mid-June in Mexico. However, nest building often begins as early as March though egg laying usually waits for the rains. Some pairs raise two broods in a season. The female alone builds the nest, a deep cup made mostly from grass that sometimes incorporates horse- or other hair. The nest is placed in a branch fork or crotch in a shrub, typically mesquite, though cactus, hackberry, and palo verde are also used. The clutch is usually four to five eggs though as few as two are often found. The eggs are unmarked pale green or pale bluish white. Females alone incubate, for about 11 days. Fledging usually occurs eight or nine days after hatch. Both parents provision nestlings. The brown-headed cowbird (Molothrus ater) is a brood parasite.

=== Vocalization ===
Only male rufous-winged sparrows sing. They sing year-round but more frequently in the breeding season, and mostly in the morning. The species' primary song is highly variable and generally begins with introductory notes followed by a trill. One description is "an accelerating series of chips and a few chips followed by a rapid trill". The species' calls include "tzeet, tzlip, and pip" notes.

== Status ==
The IUCN has assessed the rufous-winged sparrow as being of Least Concern. It has a large range; its estimated population of 200,000 mature individuals is believed to be decreasing. No immediate threats have been identified. The species is considered uncommon throughout its range. It's "preferred habitat of thornbush and mixed bunchgrass is limited, and grazing appears to have diminished its numbers and distribution".
