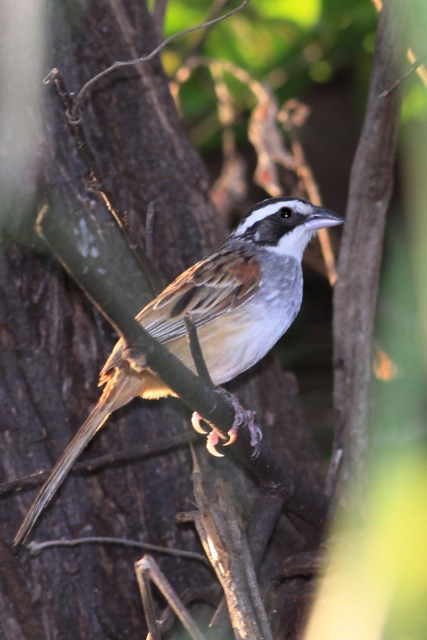

Conservation status
- Least Concern (IUCN 3.1)

Scientific classification
- Kingdom: Animalia
- Phylum: Chordata
- Class: Aves
- Order: Passeriformes
- Family: Passerellidae
- Genus: Peucaea
- Species: P. ruficauda

Binomial name
- Peucaea ruficauda (Bonaparte, 1853)

Synonyms
- See text

= Stripe-headed sparrow =

Species of bird

The stripe-headed sparrow (Peucaea ruficauda) is a species of bird in the family Passerellidae, the New World sparrows. It is found from Mexico to Costa Rica.

== Taxonomy and systematics ==
The stripe-headed sparrow was formally described in 1853 with the binomial Chondestes ruficauda. It was later reassigned to genus Aimophila. Genus Peucaea had earlier been merged into Aimophila; in 2010 taxonomic systems began restoring Peucaea to generic status and moved the stripe-headed sparrow and several other species from Aimophila to it.

The stripe-headed sparrow's further taxonomic history is unsettled. The International Ornithologists' Union, AviList, and BirdLife International's Handbook of the Birds of the World assign it these four subspecies:

- P. r. acuminata (Salvin & Godman, 1886)
- P. r. lawrencii (Salvin & Godman, 1886)
- P. r. connectens (Griscom, 1930)
- P. r. ruficauda (Bonaparte, 1853)

The Clements taxonomy assigns a fifth subspecies, P. r. ibarrorum (Dickerman, 1987), that the others include within P. r. ruficauda. Within the species it calls P. r. acuminata the "stripe-headed sparrow (northern)" and groups the other four subspecies as the "strip-headed sparrow (southern)".

This article follows the four-subspecies model.

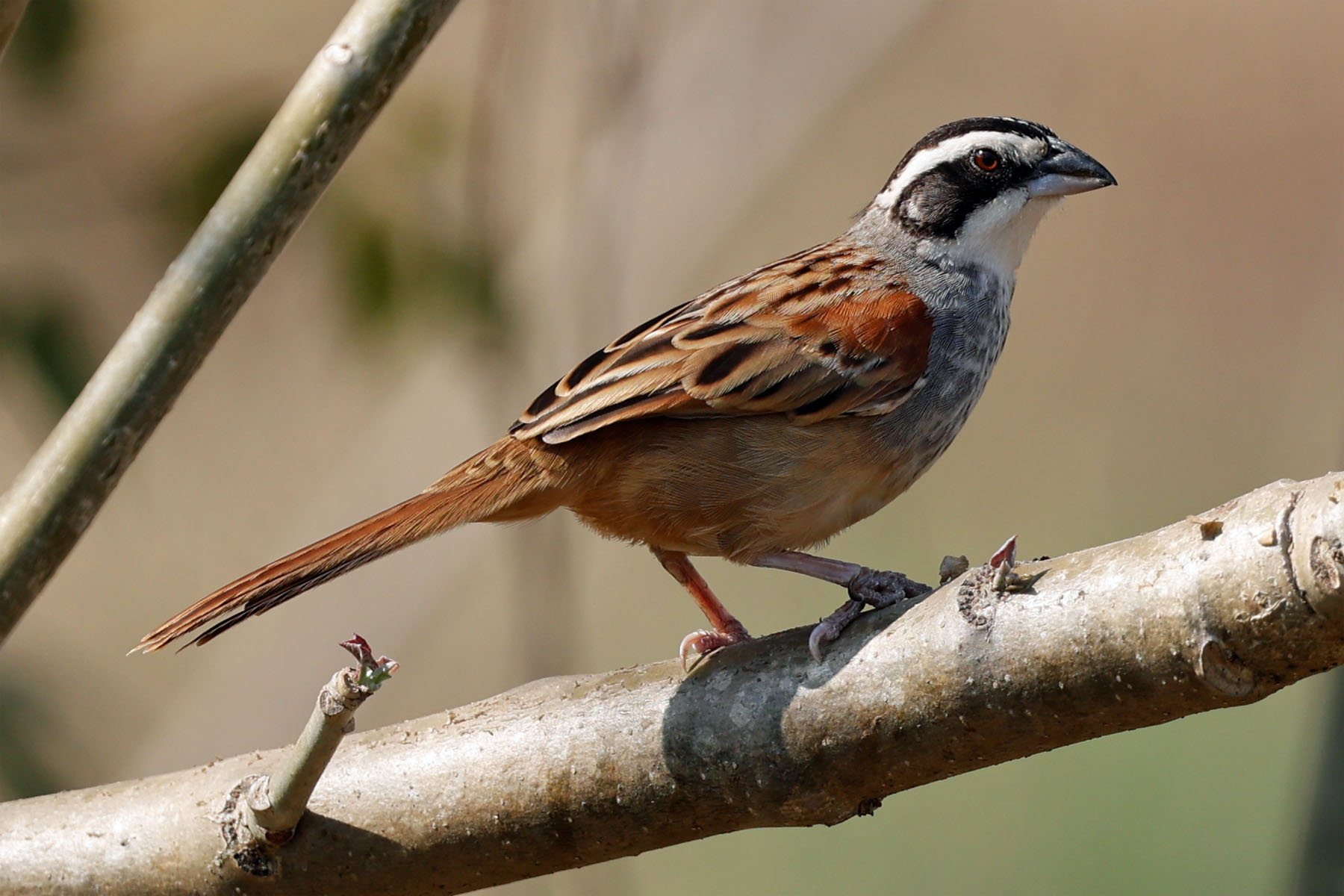
Near Terrero, Costa Rica, 8 March 2024

== Description ==
The stripe-headed sparrow is 15 to 19.5 cm (5.9 to 7.7 in) long and weighs about 25 to 45 g (0.88 to 1.6 oz). It is a medium to large sparrow whose sexes have the same plumage. Adults of the nominate subspecies P. r. ruficauda have a blackish brown crown and nape with a white stripe in the crown's middle. They have a blackish brown triangle from the lores across the ear coverts; the rear of the coverts has a pale spot. The crown and triangle are separated by a wide white supercilium. Their upperparts are mostly rufous-brown with blackish streaks. Their rump and uppertail coverts are brown to cinnamon-brown with obscure darker streaks. Their tail is rufous. Their wing is blackish brown with rufous edges on the secondaries and pale buff edges and tips on the tertials. Their median and greater coverts have rufous edges and buff tips. Their throat is white and their breast and upper flanks pale gray with an indistinct grayish "necklace". Their belly is whitish and their lower flanks and undertail coverts whitish with a cinnamon wash. Juveniles' head markings are blacker than adults'; they have dusky speckles on the throat and a duskier belly.

Subspecies P. r. lawrencii is larger than the nominate. Its head markings are browner, its upperparts grayer and less rufous, and its tail duller. P. r. connectens' size is between those of the nominate and lawrencii but it is otherwise like the nominate. P. r. acuminata is much smaller than the other subspecies. Its head markings are blacker, its ear coverts lack the others' white spot, its upperparts are browner and less rufous, and its underparts paler. All subspecies have a deep brownish red iris, a blackish maxilla, a bluish gray to ivory mandible, and pale pinkish legs and feet.

== Distribution and habit ==
The stripe-headed sparrow has a disjunct distribution; each subspecies has a separate range. The subspecies are found thus:

- P. r. acuminata: Pacific slope of Mexico from southern Durango and southern Zacatecas, south to southeastern Guerrero, and east to Morelos and southern Puebla.
- P. r. lawrencii: southern Mexico on the southern edge of the Isthmus of Tehuantepec in Oaxaca and extreme western Chiapas
- P. r. connectens: the watershed of the Motagua River in eastern Guatemala
- P. r. ruficauda: southern Guatemala south across El Salvador, western Honduras, and western Nicaragua into northwestern Costa Rica to central Puntarenas Province

The stripe-headed sparrow inhabits generally open landscapes, most of which are rather dry. These include dry grasslands with scattered leguminous trees, rocky hillsides, brushy road and field edges and hedgerows, and deciduous forest in the tropical and lower subtropical zones. Overall it ranges from sea level to 1,500 m (4,900 ft) though it reaches only 1,400 m (4,600 ft) in northern Central America and 800 m (2,600 ft) in Costa Rica.

== Behavior ==
=== Movement ===
The stripe-headed sparrow is a year-round resident.

=== Feeding ===
The stripe-headed sparrow feeds on seeds, insects, spiders, and fruits. It forages mostly on the ground and otherwise near it in vegetation. It usually is found in small groups of up to about seven individuals but may also gather in larger flocks.

=== Breeding ===
The stripe-headed sparrow breeds between April and November and is thought to often raise two broods in a season. It is a cooperative breeder with up to seven birds recorded attending a single nest. The nest is a deep cup made from grass and twigs lined with finer grasses and hair. It typically is in a dense spiny bush between about 0.3 and 1.5 m (1 and 5 ft) above the ground. The clutch is two to four pale blue eggs. The incubation period, time to fledging, and details of parental care are not known.

=== Vocalization ===
In northern Central America the stripe-headed sparrow sings "a varied scratchy warble lasting several seconds; also a rapid tip-tip-tip-tip-tip-tip-tip-ti'ti'ti'ti'ti-tip-tip-tip...". Its call there is "a soft, high-pitched seeet!". Another call is "a nasal chuh".

== Status ==
The IUCN has assessed the stripe-headed sparrow as being of Least Concern. It has a very large range; its estimated population of 500,000 mature individuals is believed to be stable. No immediate threats have been identified. It is considered overall "fairly common to common" but "more local in [the] interior". It is uncommon to fairly common in most of northern Central America but local in the Motagua watershed. In Costa Rica it is common in the northwest and uncommon further south.
