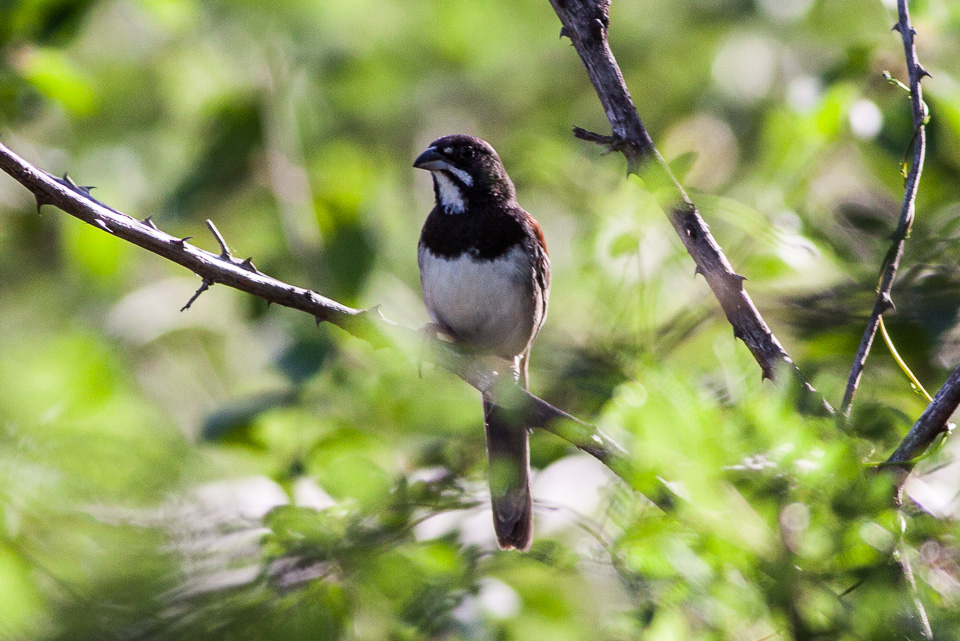

Conservation status
- Least Concern (IUCN 3.1)

Scientific classification
- Kingdom: Animalia
- Phylum: Chordata
- Class: Aves
- Order: Passeriformes
- Family: Passerellidae
- Genus: Peucaea
- Species: P. humeralis

Binomial name
- Peucaea humeralis (Cabanis, 1851)

Synonyms
- See text

= Black-chested sparrow =

Species of bird

The black-chested sparrow (Peucaea humeralis) is a species of bird in the family Passerellidae, the New World sparrows. It is endemic to Mexico.

== Taxonomy and systematics ==
The black-chested sparrow was formally described in 1851 with the binomial Haemophila humeralis. It was later reassigned to genus Aimophila. Genus Peucaea had earlier been merged into Aimophila; in 2010 taxonomic systems began restoring Peucaea to generic status and moved the black-chested sparrow and several other species from Aimophila to it.

The black-chested sparrow is monotypic.

== Description ==
The black-chested sparrow is 15 to 15.5 cm (5.9 to 6.1 in) long and weighs about 18 to 28 g (0.63 to 0.99 oz). The sexes have the same plumage. Adults have a mostly blackish head with a white spot on the lores and a white "moustache". The black of their head extends under their white throat to form a band across the chest. Their scapulars and back are rufous with darker brown mottling and their rump and uppertail coverts are olive-brown. Their tail is blackish brown with paler brown feather edges. Their wings are also blackish brown with paler brown feather edges, except that the greater coverts have white tips that show as two wing bars. Their underparts below the chest band are mostly whitish with a cinnamon wash on the flanks and undertail coverts. They have a brown iris, a black maxilla, a blue-gray mandible, and pale pinkish legs and feet. Juveniles have a grayish head and chest band and a crown streaked with rufous.

== Distribution and habitat ==
The black-chested sparrow is found somewhat inland in southwestern Mexico from southern Jalisco and Colima, south to Guerrero and southwestern Oaxaca, and east to Morelos and Puebla. It inhabits arid lowland and montane scrub forest and thorn forest in the tropical and lower subtropical zones. Sources differ on its elevational range. One states it is sea level to 1,500 m (4,900 ft) and another that it is 300 to 1,500 m (1,000 to 4,900 ft).

== Behavior ==
=== Movement ===
The black-chested sparrow is a year-round resident.

=== Feeding ===
The black-chested sparrow's diet has not been studied. However, in the breeding season it apparently feeds mostly on larval and adult insects with some seeds and fruit. It typically forages singly or in pairs though occasionally in small groups that are apparently families. It forages mostly at the tops of trees by gleaning while perched and while hovering after a brief sortie.

=== Breeding ===
The black-chested sparrow breeds between May and September. It is believed to often raise two broods and sometimes more in a season. Its nest is a cup made from grass and twigs lined with finer grasses and hair; it sometimes has a canopy of grass over it. It usually is placed in dense vegetation on the ground or close to it. Its eggs are bluish white with dark spots. The usual clutch size, incubation period, time to fledging, and details of parental care are not known.

=== Vocalization ===
Pairs of black-chested sparrows sometimes sing in duet. Their song is "a high liquid twittering preceded by one to a few short introductory notes, bzz, bzz, bzz, t-chip ichip tip-i-see". It also has a "chatter-song" and a soft "whisper song". Its calls are "pit-za", a "chip followed by a trill", and a "thin tzeet".

== Status ==
The IUCN has assessed the black-chested sparrow as being of Least Concern. It has a large range; its estimated population of at least 20,000 mature individuals is believed to be decreasing. No immediate threats have been identified. It is considered "[o]ften common or very common in appropriate habitat".
