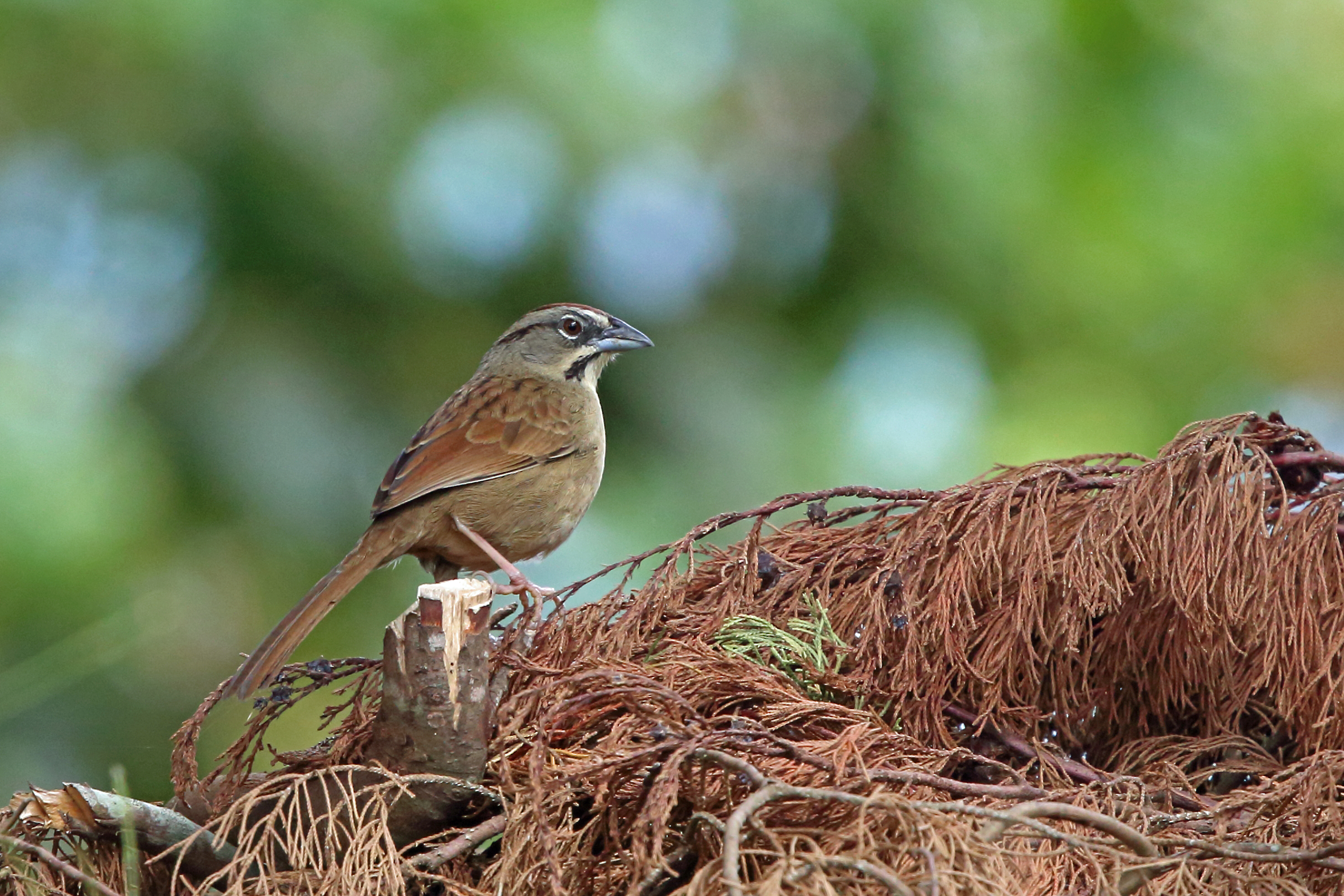

Conservation status
- Least Concern (IUCN 3.1)

Scientific classification
- Kingdom: Animalia
- Phylum: Chordata
- Class: Aves
- Order: Passeriformes
- Family: Passerellidae
- Genus: Aimophila
- Species: A. rufescens

Binomial name
- Aimophila rufescens (Swainson, 1827)

= Rusty sparrow =

Species of bird

The rusty sparrow (Aimophila rufescens) is a species of bird in the family Passerellidae, the New World sparrows. It is found from Mexico to Costa Rica.

== Taxonomy and systematics ==
The rusty sparrow was formally described by William Swainson in 1827 with the binomial Pipilo rufescens, placing it among the towhees. In 1840 it was reassigned to its present genus Aimophila that Swainson had erected in 1837; the now A. rufescens was designated the genus' type species.

The rusty sparrow has these seven subspecies:

- A. r. antonensis Van Rossem, 1942
- A. r. mcleodii Brewster, 1888
- A. r. rufescens (Swainson, 1827)
- A. r. pyrgitoides (Lafresnaye, 1839)
- A. r. discolor Ridgway, 1888
- A. r. pectoralis Dickey & Van Rossem, 1927
- A. r. hypaethra Bangs, 1909

== Description ==
The rusty sparrow is 16.5 to 20 cm (6.5 to 7.9 in) long and weighs 34 to 48 g (1.2 to 1.7 oz). The sexes have the same plumage. Adults of the nominate subspecies A. r. rufescens have a chestnut crown with black streaks and a thin olive gray or buffy stripe in its middle. They have dark brown lores, a whitish streak above the lores, a white eye-ring, and a dusky stripe behind the eye on an otherwise olive grayish face. Their back and scapulars are brown with wide black streaks. Their wings are mostly brown with chestnut secondaries and inner greater coverts. Their tail is chestnut brown. Their chin, throat, and belly are grayish buff with a blackish stripe on the side of the throat. Their flanks are a deeper brownish. Juveniles are overall duller and buffier than adults. Their crown is brown with black streaks, their upperparts are dense with thin dark brown streaks, and their lower throat, breast, and flanks have a pale yellowish wash and thin dark brown streaks.

The other subspecies of the rusty sparrow differ from the nominate and each other thus:

- A. r. mcleodii: less chestnut on crown, thinner streak behind the eye, and grayer upperparts than nominate
- A. r. antonensis: much like mcleodii but paler and grayer sides, flanks, and undertail coverts
- A. r. pyrgitoides: much like nominate
- A. r. discolor: paler overall than nominate
- A. r. pectoralis: throat and breast middle whiter and underparts grayer than nominate; darkish band across the upper breast
- A. r. hypaethra: much like nominate

All subspecies have a dark brown iris, a black maxilla, a grayish blue mandible, and brown to brownish pink legs and feet.

== Distribution and habitat ==
The rusty sparrow has a disjunct distribution; some subspecies have very limited ranges. The subspecies are found thus:

- A. r. antonensis: Sierra de San Antonio in northwestern Mexico's north-central Sonora
- A. r. mcleodii: northwestern Mexico from eastern Sonora and western Chihuahua south to northern Sinaloa and northwestern Durango
- A. r. rufescens: western and southern Mexico from southern Sinaloa south to southwestern Chiapas and east to Guanajuato to southern Puebla.
- A. r. pyrgitoides: eastern and southeastern Mexico from southern Tamaulipas and eastern San Luis Potosí south through Guatemala, Honduras and northern and eastern El Salvador into northwestern Nicaragua
- A. r. discolor: far eastern Honduras and northeastern Nicaragua
- A. r. pectoralis: west of pyrgitoides from Chiapas south through Guatemala into El Salvador and Honduras
- A. r. hypaethra: Pacific slope of northwestern Costa Rica's Cordillera de Guanacaste

The rusty sparrow inhabits pine-oak forest, the edges and shrubby clearings of deciduous forest, scrublands and scrubby secondary forest, and pine savanna in the tropical to lower temperate zones. In Costa Rica it is "confined to grassy slopes dotted with boulders, dense shrubs, and small trees". Overall it ranges in elevation from sea level to 2,700 m (8,900 ft). It reaches 2,600 m (8,500 ft) in northern Central America but is rare there below 300 m (1,000 ft). In Costa Rica it ranges between 500 and 1,100 m (1,600 and 3,600 ft).

== Behavior ==
=== Movement ===
The rusty sparrow is a year-round resident.

=== Feeding ===
The rusty sparrow's diet has not been studied but in Costa Rica is known to include seeds and small invertebrates. Overall it is thought to feed on seeds, insects, spiders, fruits and sometimes nectar. It feeds on the ground, usually singly or in pairs.

=== Breeding ===
The rusty sparrow's breeding season has not been defined but is known to include May to July in southern Mexico and June in Guatemala and El Salvador. One nest was described as being woven from grass and lined with finer grass. The few known nests were on the ground or in shrubs up to about 2.4 m (8 ft) above the ground. The species' eggs are plain pale bluish white. The incubation period, time to fledging, and details of parental care are not known.

=== Vocalization ===
In northern Central America the rusty sparrow sings "a rich, liquid cheet-cheet-swing-you! or sweet-sweet-to'you!. It also makes "an agitated, sputtering scold, seeeee!-peu'peu'peu'peu'peu'peu'peu...". In Costa Rica it sings "resolutely with a bright cheet, chee-chee-chee-chee yew". The species' calls include "a gruff, dry scolding chrrr-rrr-rrr or grrr-grr-grrr and tzee, chip, and tzeek.

== Status ==
The IUCN has assessed the rusty sparrow as being of Least Concern. It has a very large range; its estimated population of at least 500,000 mature individuals is believed to be stable. No immediate threats have been identified. It is considered common to fairly common in Mexico. It is fairly common above 300 m (1,000 ft) in northern Central America and rare in Costa Rica.
