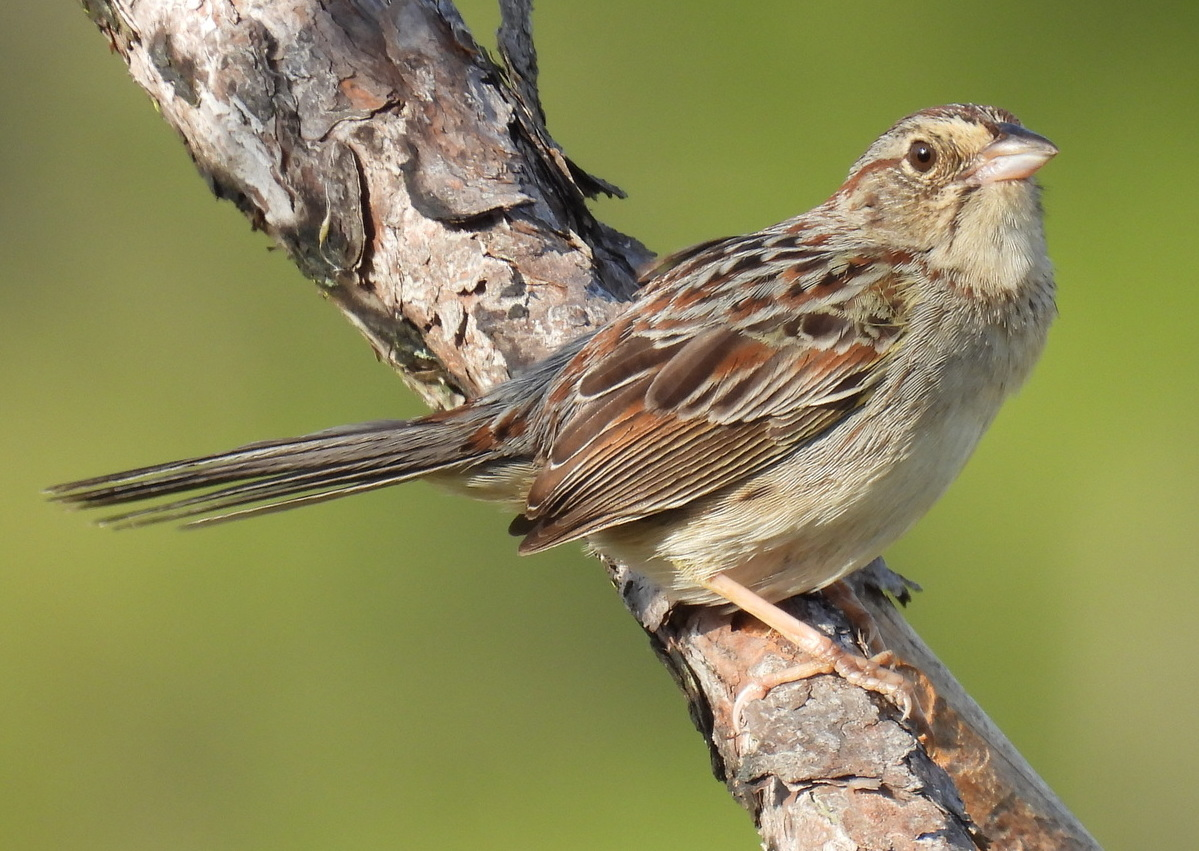

Conservation status
- Near Threatened (IUCN 3.1)

- Vulnerable (NatureServe)

Scientific classification
- Kingdom: Animalia
- Phylum: Chordata
- Class: Aves
- Order: Passeriformes
- Family: Passerellidae
- Genus: Peucaea
- Species: P. aestivalis

Binomial name
- Peucaea aestivalis (Lichtenstein, MHC, 1823)

Subspecies
- Peucaea aestivalis aestivalis Peucaea aestivalis bachmani Peucaea aestivalis illinoensis
- Breeding Year-round

Synonyms
- Aimophila aestivalis (Lichtenstein, MHC, 1823); Fringilla aestivalis Lichtenstein, MHC, 1823

= Bachman's sparrow =

Species of bird

Bachman's sparrow (Peucaea aestivalis), also known as the pinewoods sparrow or oakwoods sparrow, is a small American sparrow that is endemic to the southeastern United States. This species was named in honor of Reverend John Bachman.

Adults have rufous brown upperparts and crown with gray and black streaking on the nape, back and primaries. The face is gray with a rufous brown eyestripe. It has a buff colored breast and whitish belly. These are mid-sized New World sparrows, measuring 12.2–16.2 cm (4.8–6.4 in) and weighing 18.4–23 g (0.65–0.81 oz).

Their breeding habitat is open pine forests. The domed nest is usually built on the ground near a clump of grass or a bush. Females lay three to five eggs.

Bachman's sparrow is primarily a non-migratory resident, but it may retreat from some of the most northerly territories. The species is mainly a granivore, but it will also take some insects.

This bird is considered near threatened by the IUCN, with habitat loss one of the major factors often cited in its decline. Habitat degradation due to later stages of forest succession has also been attributed to the decline of this species. Prescribed forest burns may assist in recovery.

The primary song begins as a clear whistle, followed by a short trill.

== Distribution ==
Bachman's sparrows occur primarily in the southeastern United States from the central region of peninsular Florida north to southeastern North Carolina and west through portions of Tennessee, Kentucky and Missouri to eastern Oklahoma and eastern Texas. Following forest conversion and the spread of agricultural fields up into the early 1900s, Bachman's sparrows rapidly expanded their range and began breeding in Illinois, Indiana, Ohio, West Virginia, Virginia, Maryland, and parts of Pennsylvania. However, this trend reversed during the 1930s as much of the eastern deciduous forest recovered. Bachman's sparrows are thought to have been extirpated from Virginia in the early 2000s, and North Carolina is now the northern periphery of their eastern range.

Among the three subspecies of Bachman's sparrow, Peucaea aestivalis aestivalis breeds furthest east, from southeast South Carolina to peninsular Florida. Peucaea a. bachmanii occurs west of P. a. aestivalis to Mississippi and north to Kentucky. P. a. illinoensis occurs in the westernmost region of the species' range.

== Timing of major life events ==
=== Migration ===
Reviews and a field guide summarize the limited information available on Bachman's sparrow migration. Bachman's sparrows in the southern portion of their range are resident, while those in Missouri, Arkansas, eastern Oklahoma, Tennessee, Virginia, parts of North Carolina, and extreme northern Mississippi and Alabama have been thought to migrate south during winter. Historical records suggest that Bachman's sparrows that once bred from Illinois to Pennsylvania did migrate to the south. Records of Bachman's sparrow occurrence on breeding grounds and specimens of subspecies collected outside their normal breeding range suggest that spring migration occurs from mid-March to May and fall migration occurs from late August through to late October. However, migration of Bachman's sparrows in the northern part of their current range is not well understood and it may be that suitable habitat conditions do not necessitate migration. Because of their secretive nature, determining the presence of Bachman's sparrows is difficult outside of the breeding season, when individuals rarely sing and perch visibly. However, examination of eBird data from recent decades suggests that several populations of Bachman's sparrows remain in North Carolina for the winter.

=== Breeding ===
Bachman's sparrows' breeding season typically begins in April and continues through August. The earliest date for Bachman's sparrow eggs in Florida is 14 April and the latest date is 4 August. The earliest Bachman's sparrow nest found during a study in longleaf pine habitat of South Carolina was 10 April, while the latest nest found was early in the incubation stage on 5 August. In a study of Bachman's sparrow reproduction in shortleaf and loblolly pine plantations of Arkansas, egg laying started as early as 17 April and continued until 26 August. However, 85% of clutches were started in May, June, or July.

Bachman's sparrows typically raise two broods per breeding season and will renest after failed attempts. In shortleaf and loblolly pine plantations of Arkansas, the average time between fledging of the first brood and starting the second brood was 12.3 days. This was not significantly (p=0.39) different from the 9.7-day average period between a failed nest and a subsequent nest attempt. On average, females attempted 3.1 nests per season. The maximum number of attempts per season was five. The maximum number of nests attempted in longleaf pine habitat of South Carolina was also five. After two successful nests, a female attempted three times to raise a third brood. Limited evidence suggests that three broods per season may occur occasionally.

Bachman's sparrow nests are constructed on the ground by females and are primarily made of grasses. All nests (n=71) found in a study in shortleaf and loblolly pine plantations of Arkansas were built on the ground. Most nests (70%) were built at the base of bluestem clumps (Andropogon spp.), although nests were found at the base of small trees, forbs, and other grass species. Bachman's sparrow nests are dome-shaped with an opening typically oriented to the north. However, there is some variation in nest shape and on the Arkansas study site above, only 7% of nests were not either partially or completely domed. Bachman's sparrow nest shape may vary geographically, as nests found farther north in their historic range were infrequently domed.

Clutch size varies from three to five. Average clutch size on a site in Arkansas was 3.9, while in a longleaf pine community in South Carolina mean clutch size was 3.6. Both of these studies found significant (p≤0.02) decreases in clutch size as the breeding season progressed. On a dry prairie site in Florida (n=9) average clutch size was 3.44 and on another (n=5) it was 3.6. In shortleaf and loblolly pine plantations of Arkansas, females laid an average of 11.6 eggs (n=20) over the course of the breeding season.

In shortleaf and loblolly pine plantations in Arkansas, females incubated eggs for 13 to 14 days. The average nestling period was 9 days, and the average period between fledging and independence was 25 days. Both parents care for the young during these periods. A review suggests that Bachman's sparrows probably breed the year after hatching.

Bachman's sparrows exhibit some fidelity to breeding sites. Over a two-year period in shortleaf and loblolly pine plantations of central Arkansas, 6 of 34 adults returned to areas where they had a territory in a previous year. This varied across years, with a 29% return rate of adult birds banded in 1983 and none of the adults banded in 1984 returning to the site in 1985. No juveniles (n=60) returned to the site.

=== Nesting success ===
Values of nest success reported for Bachman's sparrows vary. Daily nest survival rate of Bachman's sparrow ranged from 0.89 to 0.96 across sites and years in the dry prairie of central Florida. On average 3.13 birds were fledged per successful Bachman's sparrow nest. Estimates of productivity ranged from 1.21 to 4.16 offspring per pair per year across sites and years. In a South Carolina longleaf pine community, daily survival rate of Bachman's sparrow nests in 1995 was 0.952, which was significantly (p=0.04) higher than the 1996 daily nest survival rate of 0.889. Earlier nesting attempts (before June 15, n=15) had significantly (p=0.05) higher survival rates than those started later in the year (n=11). Daily nest survival rate was 0.922 during incubation and 0.973 during the nestling stage. In central Arkansas, daily success rate during the incubation period was 0.965, while in the nestling period it was 0.919. In the glades of south-central Missouri, 8 female Bachman's sparrows fledged an average of 1.5 young per season over 2 years. Predation accounted for 80% of egg loss on study sites in Arkansas and 94% of nest failures on sites in central Florida. Daily survival rates of nests in the Sandhills of North Carolina were 0.947 and 0.951. Nest survival in North Carolina and South Carolina declined significantly later in the breeding season.

Information on Bachman's sparrow nest predators can be found in the Predators section of this summary. Cowbirds, nest abandonment, and prescribed fire are other known causes of nest failure. There are several accounts of Bachman's sparrow exhibiting nest defense behavior. One study recorded video evidence of a Bachman's sparrow successfully leading a cottonmouth away from its nest. In the same study, three individuals used ptiloerection and two individuals chased away an approaching cotton rat. There have also been some reports of Bachman's sparrows which feign injury or imitate the movement of a snake, even emitting a hissing noise, at the approach of danger.

=== Survival ===
Survival of Bachman's sparrows during the breeding season has been investigated in a South Carolina study area dominated by longleaf pine. Recapture of banded birds resulted in a monthly survival rate during the breeding season of 0.94. Using radio telemetry, average survival of Bachman's sparrows from 20 April to 26 July was 80.0%. In another radio telemetry study, four mortalities out of 38 Bachman's sparrows were documented over two years. The overall breeding season survival rate was estimated as 0.893. According to a literature review, Bachman's sparrows have been captured that were at least three years old.

== Preferred habitat ==
Bachman's sparrows inhabit areas with a dense layer of ground vegetation and open mid-stories with scattered shrubs and saplings, including young clearcuts and open pine (Pinus spp.) forests.

=== Habitat characteristics ===
Bachman's sparrows' selection of a dense layer of herbaceous vegetation is widely documented. Vegetation density was greater below 3 feet (0.9 m) than above 3 feet (0.9 m) and percent ground cover and percent grass cover were consistently higher (>58%) on sites occupied by Bachman's sparrow than unoccupied sites in Arkansas, Alabama, Florida, South Carolina and North Carolina. In 17- to 28-year- old slash pine plantations of northwestern Florida that had been burned within 4 years, Bachman's sparrow abundance was significantly (p=0.043) correlated (r=0.46) with relative volume of grass. In longleaf and loblolly pine stands of varying ages and under different management in South Carolina, areas occupied by Bachman's sparrows consistently had high vegetation volumes ≤3 feet (1 m) above ground. Sites occupied by Bachman's sparrows in longleaf pine woodlands of Florida managed for the red-cockaded woodpecker (Picoides borealis) had significantly (p=0.007) higher vegetation densities ≤ 2 feet (0.5 m) than unoccupied sites in the study area. Grass density, primarily bluestems (Andropogon spp. and Schizachyrium spp.) ≤ 2 feet (0.5 m) above ground, was also significantly (p=0.004) greater on occupied compared to unoccupied sites. Bachman's sparrows were significantly (p≤0.01) more abundant in mixed pine-grassland restoration stands in Mississippi, which had greater understory, grass, and forb cover, than traditionally managed stands. In 1- to 6-year-old loblolly pine stands of eastern Texas, herbaceous ground cover (p=0.003) was greater in study areas occupied by Bachman's sparrows. In south-central Missouri, glades occupied by Bachman's sparrows had significantly more grass (p=0.03) and forb cover (p=0.0005) than unoccupied glades. However, vegetation densities below 3 feet (0.9 m) and percent ground and grass cover in areas occupied by Bachman's sparrow did not differ significantly (p>0.05) from unoccupied areas of loblolly and shortleaf pine plantations in Arkansas.

Despite an emphasis on grass and herbaceous vegetation under 3 feet, recent studies have shown that Bachman's sparrows show a threshold level response to grass density and actually decline in regions where grass is too dense. Because Bachman's sparrows often walk across the ground instead of flying, grass that is too dense may impede movement. Further, though Bachman's sparrows select home ranges with a relatively low density of woody vegetation, individual birds seem to select microhabitat within their range with greater density of woody vegetation. This may be due to the importance of woody song perches for males and woody vegetation as escape cover.

Factors such as the patchiness of vegetation and species composition of the ground layer may affect habitat suitability by influencing foraging success and the availability of food and nesting material. In Georgia, Bachman's sparrows did not occur in open areas with uniformly dense herbaceous vegetation, despite these sites having a similar volume of vegetation ≤3 feet (1 m) above ground as recently burned pineland sites that were occupied by Bachman's sparrow. Although measurements were not taken, observations of Bachman's sparrow in clearcuts in eastern Texas suggest they may favor tall grass in clumpy rather that uniform distribution. In loblolly and shortleaf pine plantations of Arkansas, explanations suggested for a lack of evidence of ground layer features influencing selection of breeding territories included importance of habitat characteristics that were not measured, such as patchiness of the herbaceous layer and species composition. In a predominantly longleaf pine forest in Georgia, Bachman's sparrows were significantly (p=0.04) more abundant in areas where ground cover was primarily Beyrich threeawn (Aristida beyrichiana), compared to relatively disturbed communities of bluestems (Andropogon spp.) and silkgrass (Pityopsis spp.).

Amount of litter and debris on a site may influence Bachman's sparrow habitat selection. Percent litter cover was consistently high (>58%) on sites occupied by Bachman's sparrow in Arkansas, Alabama, Florida, South Carolina and North Carolina. Although statistical significance was not tested due to small sample size, Bachman's sparrows occurred at higher densities in control plots (1.5 territories/40 ha) than plots that had downed coarse woody debris >4 inches (10 cm) in diameter removed (0.4 territories/40 ha) in a loblolly pine forest of South Carolina. Haggerty suggests that litter may provide habitat for Bachman's sparrow prey, but that too much litter could interfere with foraging. In loblolly and shortleaf pine plantations of Arkansas, litter cover (78%) and depth (0.5 inches (1.2 cm) on sites occupied by Bachman's sparrows were significantly (p≤0.01) lower than litter cover (88.9%) and depth (1.6 inches (4.2 cm)) on unoccupied sites.

Bachman's sparrow inhabits areas with open overstories. In sites in eastern Texas of varying age since clearcutting, study areas occupied by Bachman's sparrows had significantly (p<0.01) fewer short (≤ 10 feet (3m)) and tall (>10 feet (3m)) trees than unoccupied study areas. In longleaf and loblolly pine stands of varying ages and under different management in South Carolina, plots occupied by Bachman's sparrows consistently had low volumes of vegetation from 7 to 13 feet (2–4 m) above ground compared to unoccupied sites. In middle-aged and mature forests of Georgia composed primarily of loblolly pine, Bachman sparrow densities were negatively associated with tree/shrub volume and vegetation volume from 7 to <16 feet (3 to <5 m). In loblolly and shortleaf pine plantations of Arkansas, Bachman's sparrow breeding areas had significantly lower percent canopy cover (p<0.001), shorter woody vegetation (p≤0.01) and fewer trees (p<0.001) and shrubs (p≤0.05) than unoccupied sites. In south-central Missouri, Bachman's sparrows occurred in glades with less than 30% woody cover, and occupied glades had significantly (p≤0.05) lower percentages of deciduous and coniferous saplings, deciduous and coniferous trees, and total woody vegetation. Mid-story density was marginally (p=0.055) greater on unoccupied sites, and Bachman's sparrow abundance was significantly (p=0.043) negatively correlated (r= –0.446) with mid-story density in longleaf pine woodlands of northwestern Florida. However, relative abundance of Bachman's sparrows was not significantly (p=0.107) associated with canopy cover and there were no significant (p=0.133) differences in canopy cover between occupied and unoccupied sites.

There is evidence that Bachman sparrow may select sites with some tall vegetation. In north-central Florida, densities of Bachman's sparrows in young (2–4 years) slash pine plantations with artificial snags added (n=3) was 31.4 pairs/km^{2}, while in similar vegetation without snags (n=3) Bachman's sparrow density was 22.3 pairs/km^{2} [8]. In an area in South Carolina composed of longleaf and loblolly pine, Bachman's sparrow occurred at significantly (p=0.002) higher density in clearcuts than middle-aged (22–50 years) stands, while in another area clearcuts had relatively low densities of Bachman's sparrows. Vegetation differences between the 2 sites are likely to explain the difference. The site with relatively low densities of Bachman's sparrows had been rolled with a drum chopper, which resulted in a lower volume of vegetation from 3 to 7 feet (1–2 m) above ground. The authors suggest that the lack of vegetation in this height range may have limited perches, resulting in fewer birds on the site. An investigation of Bachman's sparrow habitat characteristics in 1- to 6-year-old loblolly pine stands of eastern Texas led to recommendations that 2 to 5 tall (>39 feet (12 m)) trees/100 ha remain on a clearcut for Bachman sparrow singing perches. In Georgia, the lack of vegetation from 10 to <16 feet (3 to <5 m) was suggested as a possible reason for the absence of Bachman's sparrows from open field vegetation. However, across the southeast, vegetation density from 3 to 6 feet (0.91–1.8 m) above ground varies widely on sites occupied by Bachman's sparrows, suggesting their requirements for the density of this vegetation layer are comparatively flexible.

In the dry prairie of central Florida, Bachman's sparrows used clumps of saw-palmetto that had "natural" burrows significantly (p<0.001) more than would be expected based on availability. The authors suggest that Bachman's sparrows in prairie habitat use burrows as areas of refuge from predators.

=== Landscape level effects ===
Several studies have investigated the importance of landscape attributes on Bachman's sparrows. For a discussion of the possible importance of patchiness of vegetation within a site see the habitat characteristics section.

The ability of the Bachman's sparrow to detect and colonize areas before they are no longer suitable may depend on the size and isolation of the habitat. In south-central Missouri, only glades ≥ 29 acres (11.7 ha) were occupied by Bachman's sparrows. The probability of Bachman's sparrow occupying pine-grassland restoration stands in Mississippi increased as size of areas with long burning rotations, short-harvest rotations, and no removal of hardwoods decreased (p=0.05) and as the perimeter to area ratio of these areas increased (p=0.02). In South Carolina, distance from source populations significantly (p≤ 0.05) influenced the ability of Bachman's sparrows to colonize recent clearcuts in both years on one study area and in 1 of 2 years in another study area. The authors suggest that the presence of corridors in the latter study area may have resulted in distance being less influential.

Time since fire is an important factor in Bachman's sparrow habitat use. In Florida, Bachman's sparrows abandoned sites that were greater than 5 years post fire. In North Carolina, occupancy of Bachman's sparrows decreased with years since fire. Several studies suggest that optimal sites are those that have been burned within the previous 3 years, which highlights the importance of frequent fire regimes for the successful conservation of Bachman's sparrow.

Bachman's sparrows' association with edge habitat is uncertain. In eastern Texas clearcuts with relatively abundant loblolly pine, sites with Bachman's sparrow territories were significantly (p<0.01) closer to the edge of the study area and the number of Bachman's sparrows was significantly (p<0.05) correlated (r=–0.22) with distance to edge. However, in dry prairie of central Florida the difference in Bachman's sparrow densities in edge and core habitat was not significant (p≥0.36), and both edge and core habitat were considered population sinks. In North Carolina, Bachman's sparrow occupancy increased at intermediate distances (~250 meters) from wildlife openings.

Bachman's sparrows may be dependent on landscape level factors at a large scale. An occupancy study in North Carolina used repeated point counts (n=232 points) to examine the impact of patch fragmentation and size on occupancy. They found that occupancy was very strongly correlated to percent of habitat within 3 kilometers. This sensitivity to habitat in the surrounding landscape may be related to dispersal but is not yet understood.

=== Territory and density ===
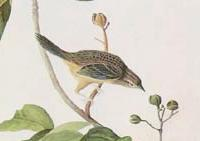

Territory size of Bachman's sparrows varies. In Missouri glades, reports of average Bachman's sparrow breeding territory range from 1.5 acres (0.62 ha, n=13) to 7 acres (2.9 ha, n=7). In loblolly and shortleaf pine plantations of central Arkansas, mean home range size (n=25) during the breeding season was 6 acres (2.5 ha). In a south-central Florida site with saw palmetto and scrub palmetto (Sabal etonia) interspersed amongst threeawn (Aristida spp.), Bachman's sparrow territories (n=6) averaged 12.5 acres (5.1 ha). In winter (November–January), the average home range size of 8 Bachman's sparrows was 1.6 acres (0.65 ha) in the dry prairie of central Florida.

Bachman's sparrow density during the breeding season has been estimated in several habitats. On clearcuts of various ages with relatively abundant loblolly pine in eastern Texas, maximum Bachman sparrow density was 1.9/10 ha. In South Carolina, Bachman's sparrow densities ranged from 0 to 0.48/ha across sites of different ages and management regimes. In Georgia, Bachman sparrow densities ranged from 0 to 0.92 birds/ha on sites ranging from an open field to middle-aged and mature forests composed primarily of loblolly pine. In a south-central Florida community composed of saw palmetto, scrub palmetto, and threeawn, Bachman's sparrow density averaged 1 male/33 ha. In dry prairie of central Florida, Bachman's sparrow densities varied from 0.92 to 3.24 territories/10 ha across sites and years. Bachman's sparrow densities calculated from breeding bird censuses in longleaf pine forests was >15 territories/40 ha, while densities from winter bird population studies were from 6 to 10 individuals/40 ha.

== Food habits ==
Bachman's sparrows forage on the ground for plant seeds and arthropods. In a predominately loblolly and shortleaf pine habitat of eastern Texas, all Bachman's sparrow foraging observations were on the ground and a literature review states that Bachman's sparrows rarely forage in shrubs.

Reviews and an investigation of the Bachman sparrow's diet in eastern Texas summarize the species that comprise the Bachman's sparrow's diet. A variety of grass seeds such as panicgrasses, bristlegrasses (Setaria sp.), crowngrasses (Paspalum spp.), and threeawns are eaten by Bachman's sparrows as well as seeds of several other taxa, including blueberries (Vaccinium spp.), pines, and sedges (Carex spp). Arthropods in the Bachman's sparrow's diet include grasshoppers and crickets (order Orthoptera), spiders (order Araneae), beetles (order Coleoptera), caterpillars (order Lepidoptera), wasps (order Hymenoptera), and leafhoppers (family Cicadellidae). Insects comprise more of the Bachman's sparrow diet in spring and fall than in winter. Stomach contents of Bachman's sparrow collected in eastern Texas in summer (n=5) and fall (n=11) had a greater abundance of insects than those collected in winter (n=4).

== Predators ==
Data demonstrating which species prey on Bachman's sparrow are lacking. However short-tailed hawks (Buteo brachyurus) [48] and possibly American kestrels (Falco sparverius) prey on adult Bachman's sparrows. Species responsible for nest predation are not generally known. Evidence in some studies suggest mammalian predators and snakes eat Bachman's sparrow nestlings.

A 2019 study in Florida video-monitored 65 nests and recorded 37 individual depredation events by 12 total species. Most (51%) of nest predation was caused by snakes (black racer, corn snake, gray rat snake, cottonmouth, and coachwhip), followed by mesomammals (coyote and bobcat; 19%), rodents (hispid cotton rat, cotton mouse, and eastern woodrat; 16%), and fire ants and blue jays (14%). Predators were not identified for 17 additional depredation events.

Bachman's sparrow nests are occasionally parasitized by brown-headed cowbirds (Molothrus ater). In shortleaf and loblolly pine plantations of central Arkansas, 5% of 38 nest failures were due to brown-headed cowbird parasitism.

== Conservation ==
The Bachman's sparrow is considered to be near threatened by the IUCN and vulnerable to extinction by NatureServe as of 2023. North American Breeding Bird Survey data suggest that the species has declined since the survey began in 1966. The species' dependence on seral communities for habitat complicates conservation management.
