= Thomas Raymond Howell =

American ornithologist

- Thomas Raymond Howell, Date Unknown.
- Born: July 17, 1924; New Orleans, Louisiana, United States
- Died: December 14, 2004 (aged 80); North Chatham, Massachusetts, United States
- Other names: Thomas R. Howell, T. R. Howell
- Occupation: Ornithologist
- Spouses: Marjorie Cade Caldwell (m. 1951; died 1958) Trudi H. Gubler (m. 1959; div. 1970) Eleanor Standal Dammann (m. 1981)
- Children: Thomas R. Howell, Jr.; Yvonne; Heidi
- Parents: W. Lyall Howell; Frances Raymond Howell

Thomas Raymond Howell (July 17, 1924 – December 14, 2004) was an American ornithologist. He was a fellow of the American Ornithological Union from 1959 until his death, and was president of it from 1982 to 1984. He was a prominent figure in ornithology during the latter part of the 20th century.

He studied at Louisiana State University beginning in 1941, but his studying was interrupted by service in World War II from 1943 to 1946. He graduated in 1946. His mentor was George Lowery (a prominent ornithologist in his own right) under whom Howell studied birds for his PhD, which he graduated with in 1951. His dissertation was on the "Natural history and geographic variation of the Yellow-bellied Sapsucker", which would be published in The Condor. The dissertation examined how gene flow is kept very low between subspecies as a result of differential migration, habitat, and color based dimorphism.

He lectured at the University of California, Los Angeles from 1951 until 1986, retiring as a full professor. He chaired the biology department from 1963 to 1966. He was lifelong friends with and taught alongside George A. Bartholomew.

His work in ornithology took him to Central America to study indigenous birds, Midway atoll to study seabird nesting energetics, as well as South Africa to study the sociable weaver. His most important contributions were in studying thermoregulation in birds, which he frequently accomplished in the hot deserts of North Africa. The Auk cites his study on Egyptian plovers as the most important of those works, discovering that the birds carry water in their feathers to transfer to the sand around their buried eggs to keep them cool in the desert heat. His studies in Central America were his other main body of work, especially in Nicaragua. Between 1951 and 1967 he repeatedly visited Nicaragua, resulting in improvements to the taxonomy of birds in Adriaan Joseph van Rossem's collection, and the discovery of a number of atypically small subspecies of temperate zone birds.

Outside of direct research he wrote the section on the Carduelinae in the 1968 version of Checklist of Birds of the World, as well as the AOU's 1983 and 1998 bird checklists. He served as president of the Cooper Ornithological Society from 1964 to 1967. Howell was a board member of the Western Foundation of Vertebrate Zoology for much of his career. He was given the Elliott Coues award in 1985. In 1995, the Pacific Seabird Group presented him with a lifetime achievement award for his "pioneering work on seabird ecology". His papers are preserved in UCLA manuscripts collection 576.

He was married three times, first in 1951 to Marjorie Cade Caldwell with whom he had one son; Caldwell died in 1958. He was married to Trudi Gubler from 1959 to 1970 when they divorced – they had two daughters. He married again in 1981 to Eleanor Dammann, whom survived him at his death in 2004.
