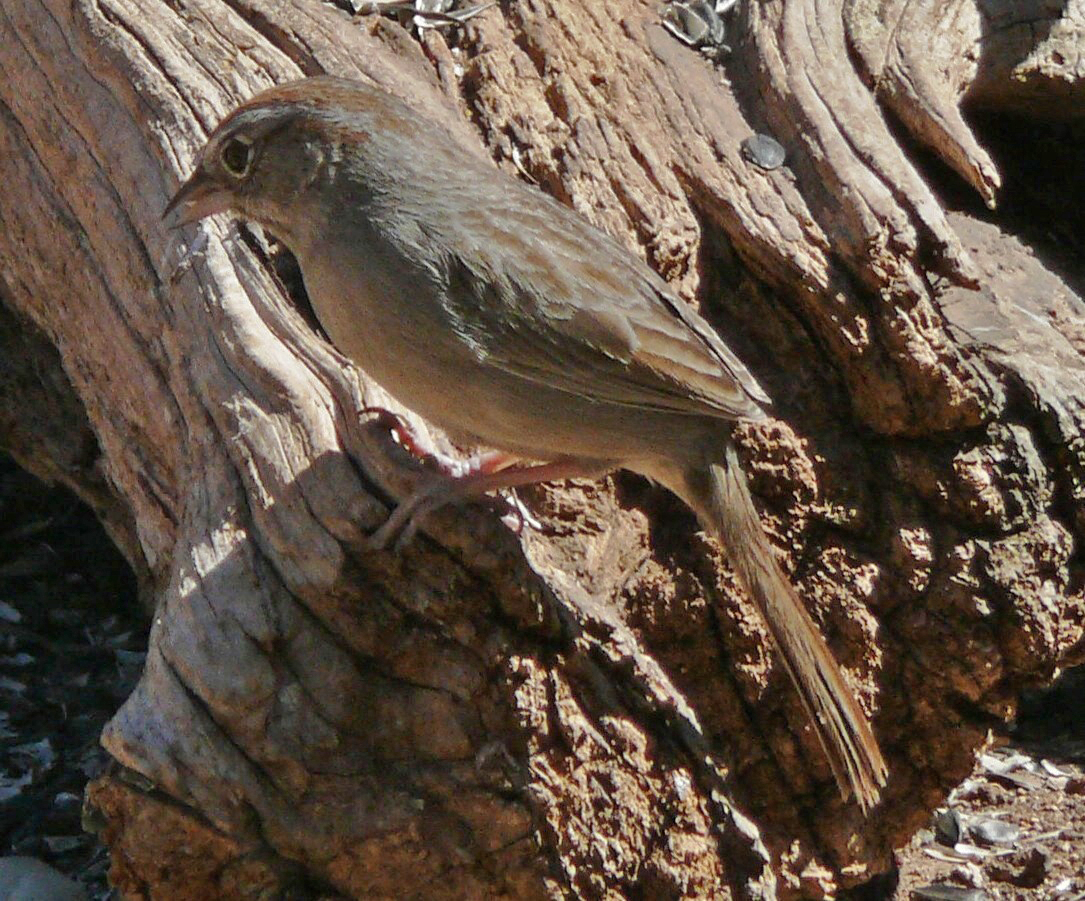
- Rufous-crowned sparrow (Aimophila ruficeps)

Scientific classification
- Kingdom: Animalia
- Phylum: Chordata
- Class: Aves
- Order: Passeriformes
- Family: Passerellidae
- Genus: Aimophila; Swainson, 1837

Type species
- Pipilo rufescens Swainson, 1827

Species
- See text

= Aimophila =

Genus of birds

Aimophila is a genus of American sparrows. The derivation of the genus name is from aimos/αιμος "thicket" and phila/φιλα "loving".

Some species that were formerly classified in Aimophila are now considered to be in the genus Peucaea.

== Species in taxonomic order ==
Genus Aimophila – Swainson, 1837 – three species
Common name	Scientific name and subspecies	Range	Size and ecology	IUCN status and estimated population
Rufous-crowned sparrow	Aimophila ruficeps (Cassin, 1852) Twelve subspecies: A. r. ruficeps; A. r. canescens; A. r. obscura; A. r. sanctorum; A. r. sororia; A. r. scottii; A. r. rupicola; A. r. simulans; A. r. eremoeca; A. r. fusca; A. r. boucardi; A. r. australis	southwestern United States and Mexico	Size: Habitat: Diet:	LC
Oaxaca sparrow	Aimophila notosticta (Sclater, PL & Salvin, 1868)	Mexico	Size: Habitat: Diet:	LC
Rusty sparrow	Aimophila rufescens (Swainson, 1827)	Belize, Costa Rica, El Salvador, Guatemala, Honduras, Mexico and Nicaragua.	Size: Habitat: Diet:	LC
