= Leioproctus chrysopsis =

Scientific classification
- Kingdom: Animalia
- Phylum: Arthropoda
- Clade: Pancrustacea
- Class: Insecta
- Order: Hymenoptera
- Family: Colletidae
- Genus: Leioproctus
- Species: L. chrysopsis

Binomial name
- Leioproctus chrysopsis Batley, 2025

Species of bee

Leioproctus chrysopsis, or Leioproctus (Euryglossidia) chrysopsis, is a species of bee in the family Colletidae and subfamily Colletinae. It is endemic to Australia. It was described by entomologist Michael Batley in 2025.

== Etymology ==
The specific epithet chrysopsis (Latin: "golden in appearance") refers to the clypeal hair of the male.

== Description ==
The male body length is 7.7 mm, female body length 10.5 mm. Integumental colouration is mainly iridescent blue on black, with a brassy sheen and brown markings. The hair is white to gold and brown.

== Distribution and habitat ==
The species occurs in inland Western Australia. The type locality is 6 km east-north-east of Warriedar in the Mid West region.

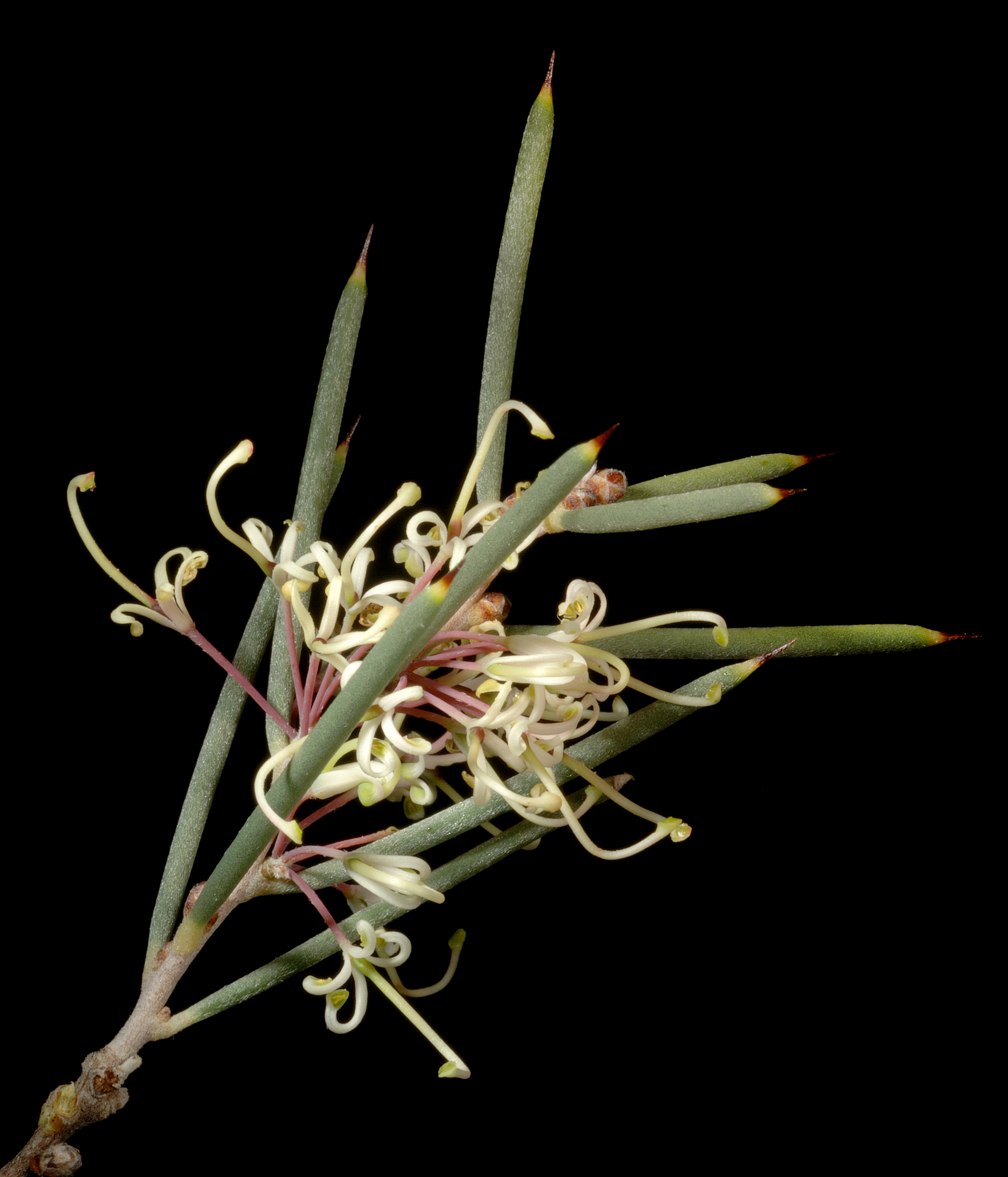
Flowers of Hakea preissii

== Behaviour ==
The adults are flying mellivores. Flowering plants visited by the bees include Grevillea erectiloba, Grevillea teretifolia, Hakea preissii and Hakea francisiana.

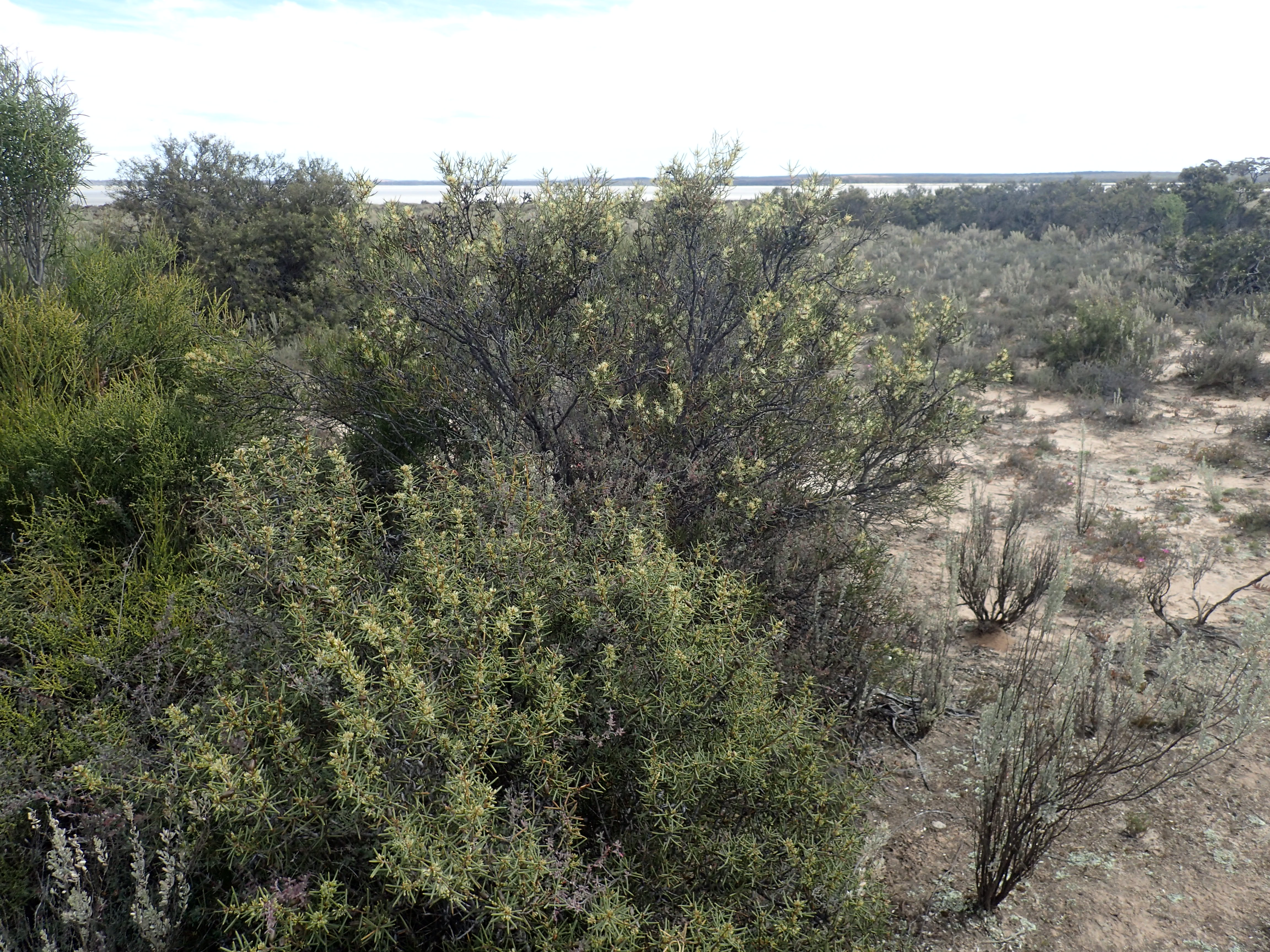
Hakea preissii (needle bush), a forage plant of the bees
