= Teotitlán del Valle =

Teotitlán del Valle Xaguixe
- Town and municipality
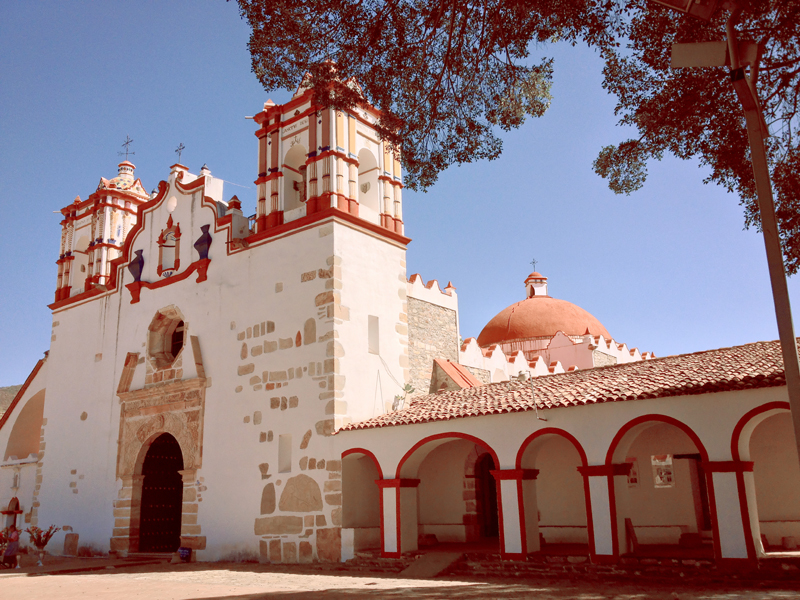
- Preciosa Sangre de Cristo Church

- Location in Mexico
- Coordinates: 17°01′45″N 96°31′12″W
- Country: Mexico
- State: Oaxaca
- Founded: 1465

Area
  - Municipality: 81.54 km^{2} (31.48 sq mi)
- Elevation: 1,670 m (5,480 ft)

Population (2005)Municipality
  - Municipality: 5,601
  - Seat: 4,427
- Time zone: UTC-6 (Central (US Central))

Teotitlán del Valle is a small village and municipality located in the Tlacolula District in the east of the Valles Centrales Region, 31 km from the city of Oaxaca in the foothills of the Sierra Juárez mountains. It is part of the Tlacolula Valley district. It is known for its textiles, especially rugs, which are woven on hand-operated looms, from wool obtained from local sheep and dyed mainly with local, natural dyes. They combine historical Zapotec designs with contemporary designs such as reproductions of famous artists' work. Artists take commissions and participate in tours of family-owned workshops. The name Teotitlán comes from Nahuatl and means "land of the gods." Its Zapotec name is Xaguixe, which means "at the foot of the mountain." Established in 1465, it was one of the first villages founded by Zapotec peoples in this area and retains its Zapotec culture and language.

== History ==
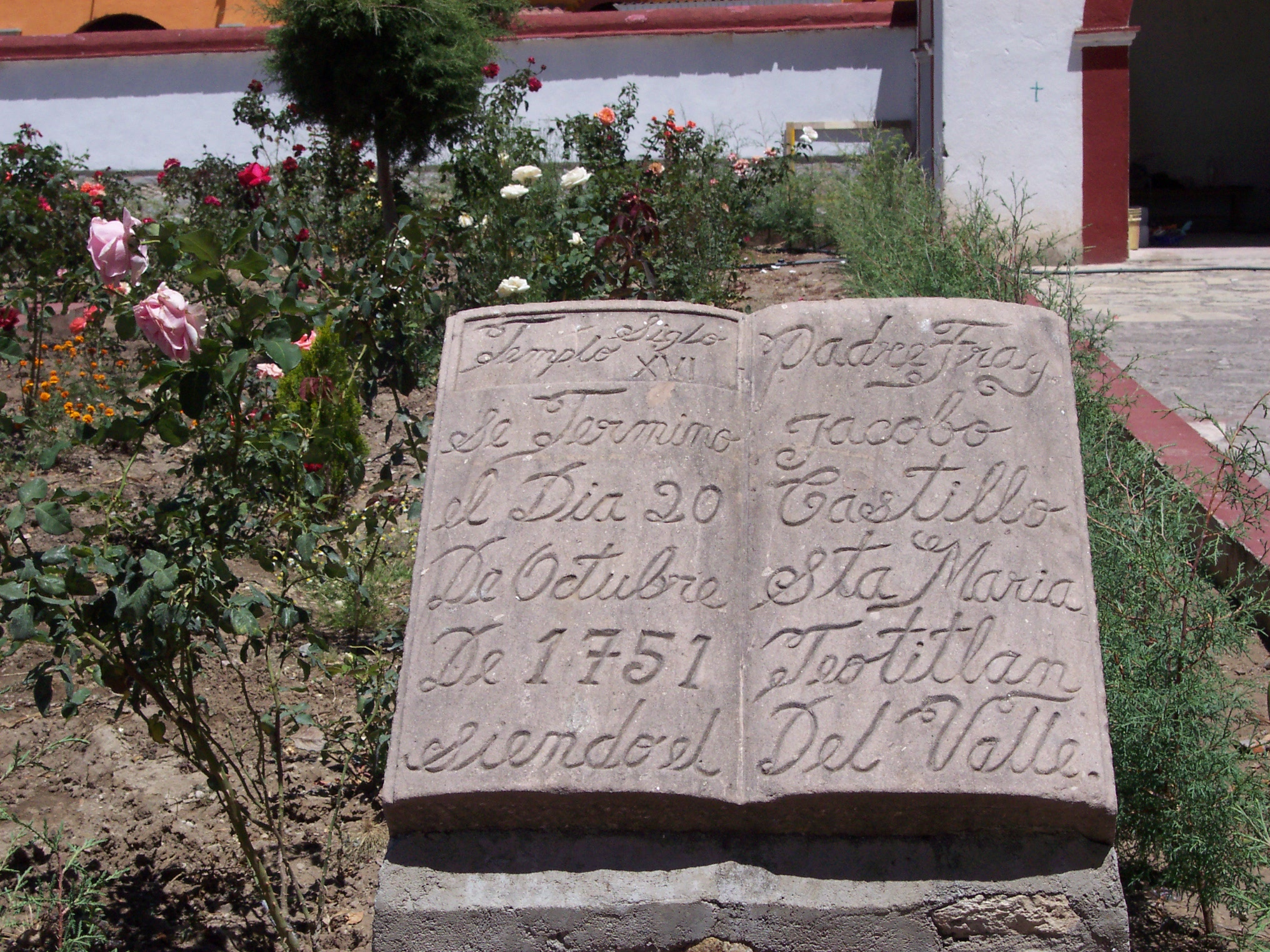
Plaque at church citing establishment date

This village is considered to be one of the first that was founded by the Zapotecs around 1465. It was originally named Xaquija, which means “celestial constellation”. According to research done by Manuel Martínez Gracida, there was a large stone split in half with the name of the Stone of the Sun. It was the first idol of the Zapotecs here. It was believed that a god came from the heavens in the form of a bird, accompanied by a constellation of stars to found the temple here. Teotitlán del Valle was refounded as a Spanish village in 1527. It is believed that the father of one of the Niños Heroes, by the name of Agustín Melgar, was from here, due to village records bearing his name.

== The town ==
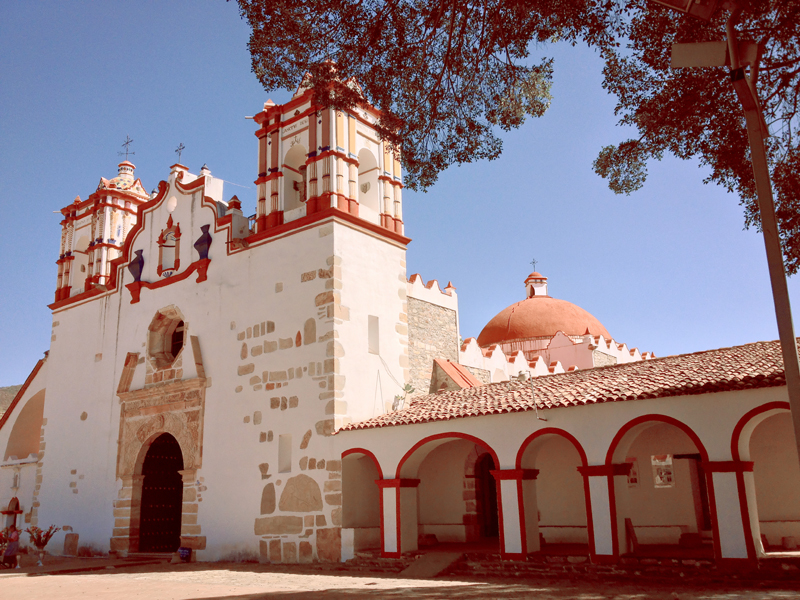
Preciosa Sangre de Cristo Church

Teotitlán del Valle is a rural town that maintains its Zapotec culture. In the municipal market, people gather at seven in the morning to buy foodstuffs and craft materials for their homes and businesses. Most people here retain ancient customs; a majority of the inhabitants speak Zapotec.

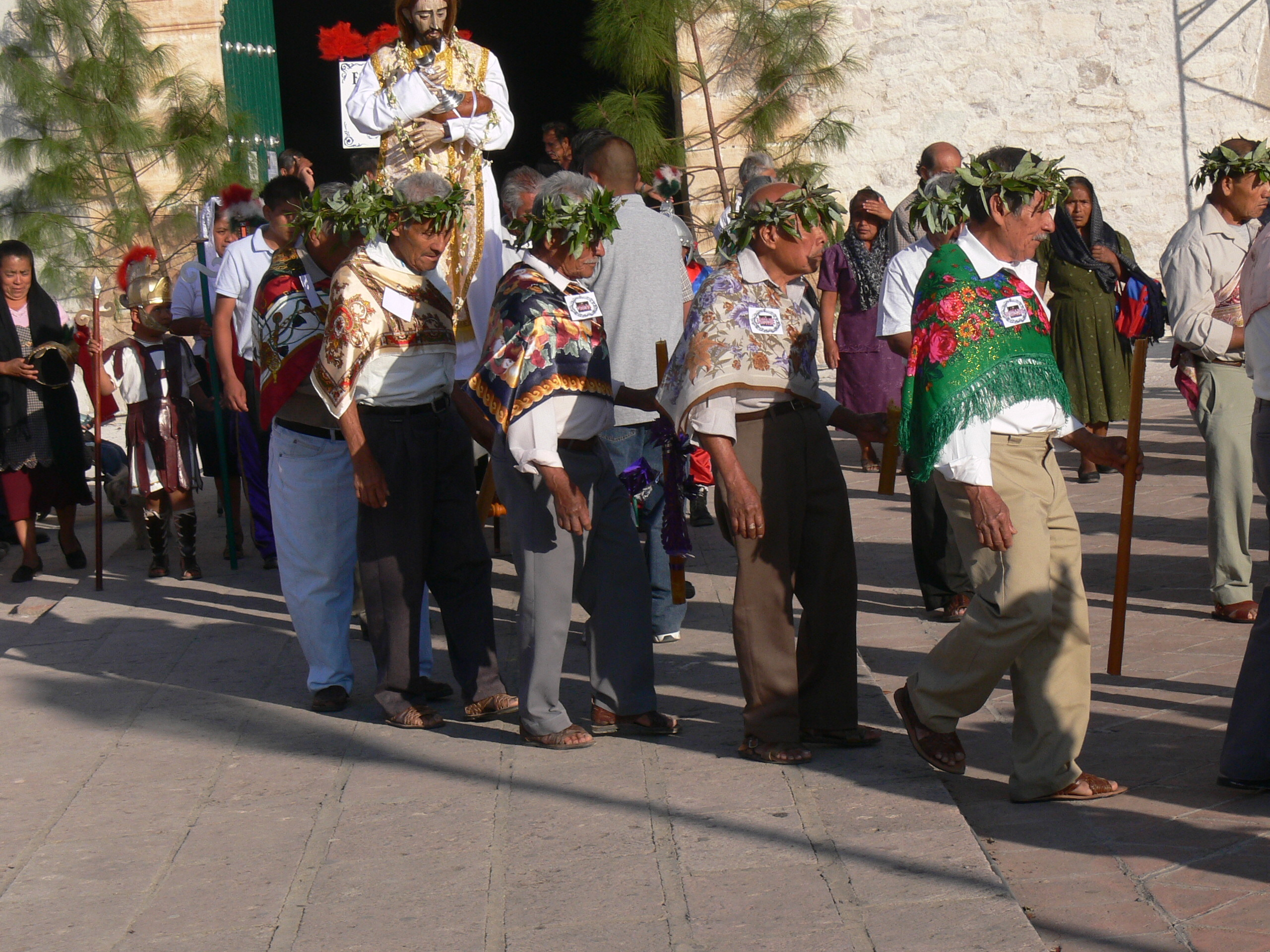
Maundy Thursday procession in front of the church

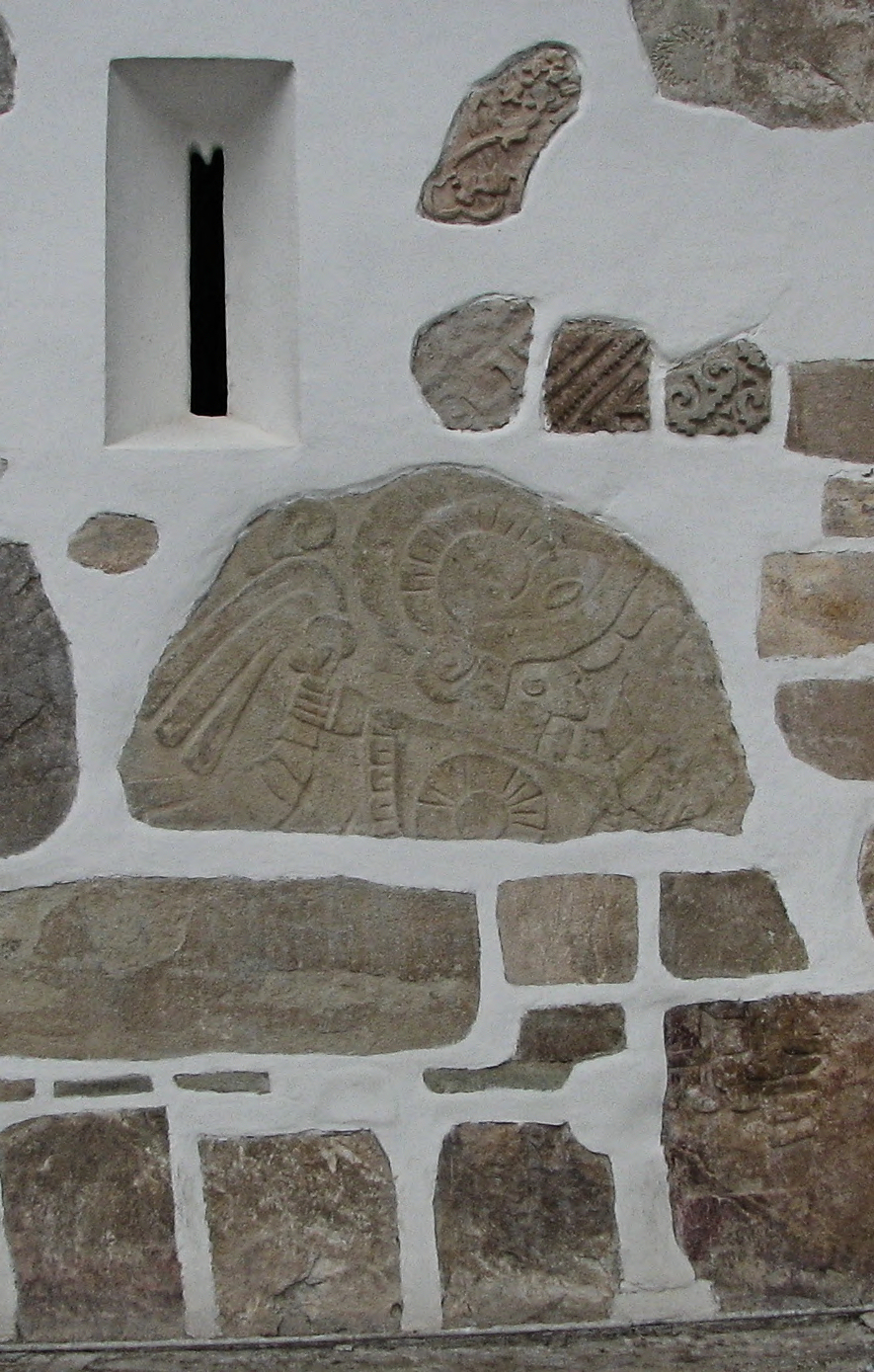
Stone from the Zapotec temple that was incorporated into the foundation of the Preciosa Sangre de Cristo church.

The two main landmarks in the town are the Preciosa Sangre de Cristo Church and the Community Museum. The Preciosa Sangre de Cristo Church is the main church of the town and municipality and was begun in 1581, although not completed until 1758. The facade of the church is made of quarried stone called cantera with decorative stonework in the main entrance and choir window. This church was built on the site of a local Zapotec temple, which was destroyed when the Spanish arrived, replacing it with this church. In the foundations of the church, some of the construction of the original temple can be seen. On the side of the church is a small archeological area. Inside there are traces of 16th century decoration with pre-Hispanic motifs. The interior is also notable for a large number of colonial-era santos or statues of saints, many executed in fine polychrome that is well preserved to the present day. Another religious attraction is the Chapel of Cristo Grande located in a private home on Aquiles Serdan Street.

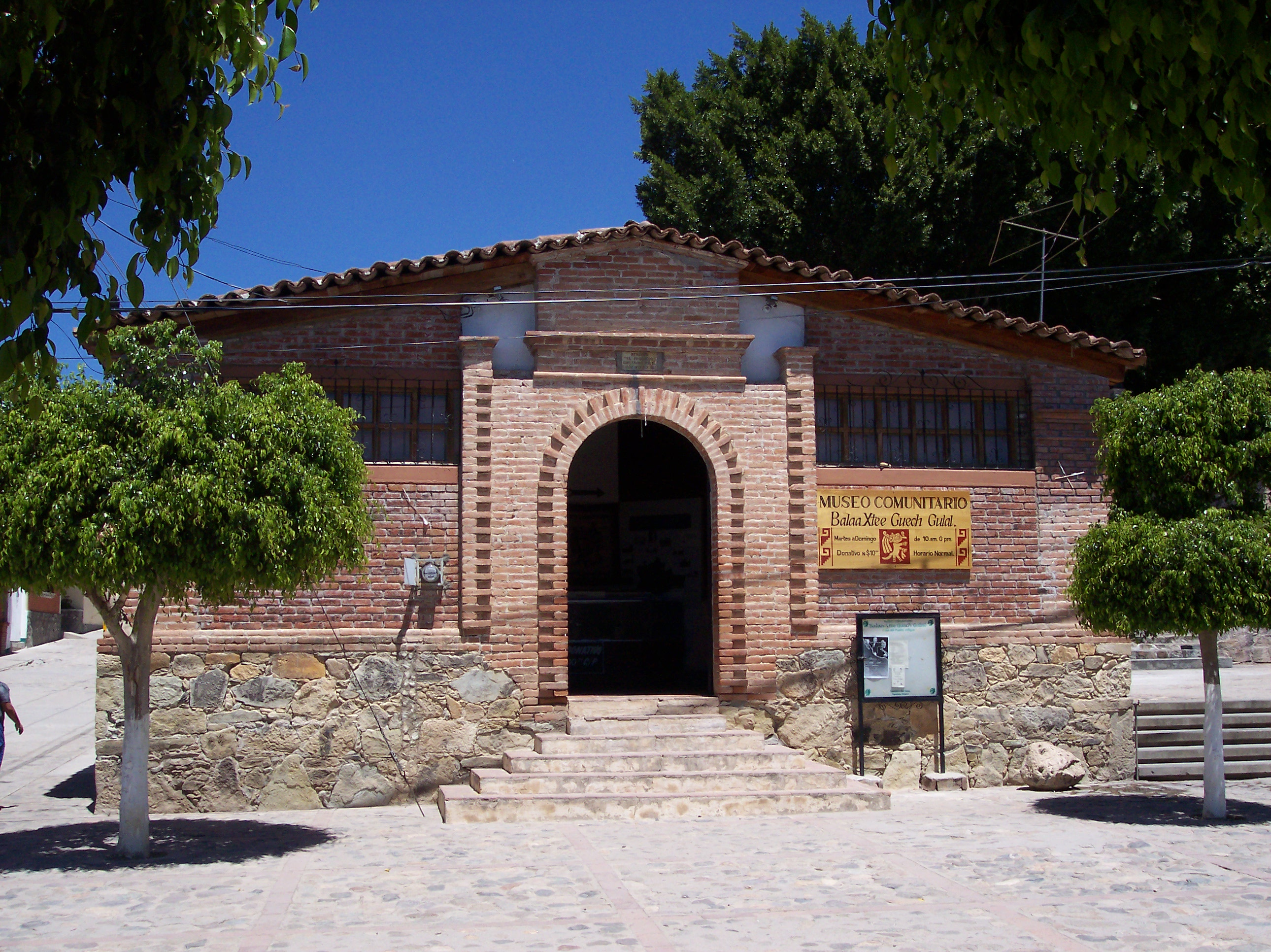
Community museum

The name of the community museum is Balaa Xtee Guech Gulal, which means “in the shadow of the old village/people.” The museum opened in 1995 and the most recent addition is a display dedicated to the Danza de la Pluma (Feather Dance). The museums contains sign in Spanish, English and Zapotec. There are three main halls, one dedicated to the archaeology of the municipality, one to crafts, and one to traditional weddings. The archeological hall contains mostly etched stones and ceramic items, which visitors can touch. A number of the pieces show signs of Olmec visitation to the area around 500 BCE. The crafts room contains items such as old photographs, looms, exhibits on how wool is processed and dyes are made and used to make textiles. The wedding hall contains a recreation of the groom performing his customary, ceremonial obligations, such as gifts. There is also a wedding mural.

According to the Enciclopedia de los Municipios de Mexico, one custom of betrothal involves the prospective groom going to the prospective bride's parents, bringing gifts such as bread, candles, decorations, chocolate and fruit. Another is to “rob” the girl (quotes in the original), then find someone to negotiate a wedding with the parents. This person generally is someone with a good reputation in the community and usually is a senior citizen. She or he communicates the intentions of the boy and states where the girl is, often with fireworks to indicate the location. After negotiations, the parents set a wedding date and all come together to arrange the wedding.

The town's major festival is the Feast of the Precious Blood of Christ which occurs each year on the first Wednesday of July and lasts about a week. The event has carnival rides and a basketball tournament but the main feature is “Danza de la Pluma” or Feather Dance (called Guyach in Zapotec). Dancers wear elaborate headdresses made from painted feathers, giving rise to the name in Spanish. The dance commemorates the conquest of the Aztec by the Spanish.

The town has a tour service called Tourist Yú'ù which brings and orients visitors to such locations as the community museum, the archeological zone, the municipality dam and two natural formations called Picacho and Cuevitas.

The most characteristic dishes here include mole negro, mole amarillo, liver with eggs and tamales, which can be filled with mole, corn, cheese, or chicken. Popular local beverages include hot chocolate, atole, atole with pulque, and mezcal. Some of these can be tasted at Zapotec chef Abigail Mendoza Ruiz's famous restaurant Tlamanalli.

== Textiles of Teotitlán del Valle ==
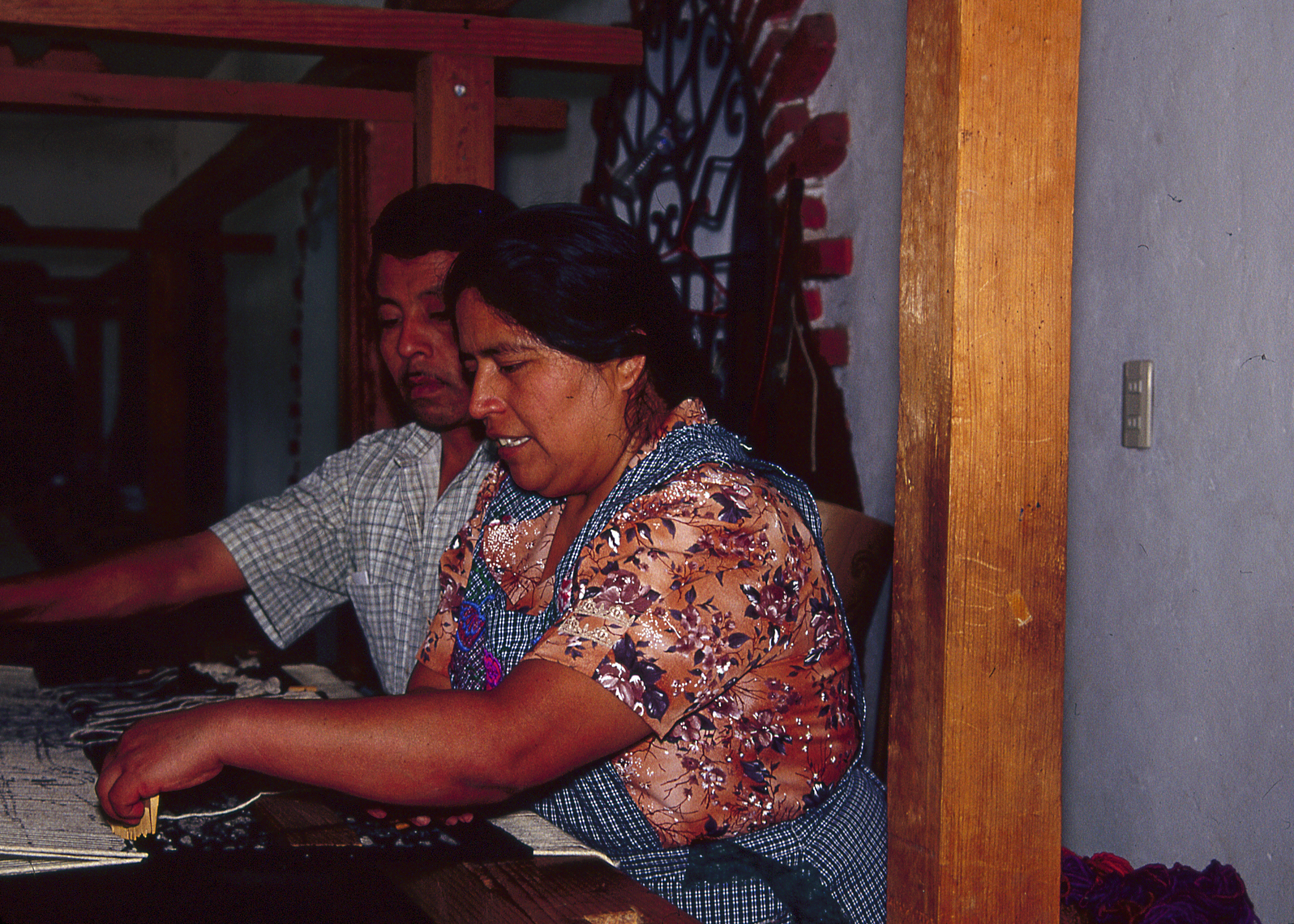
Artisan Aida Vasquez Gutierrez and her husband Manuel working on loom

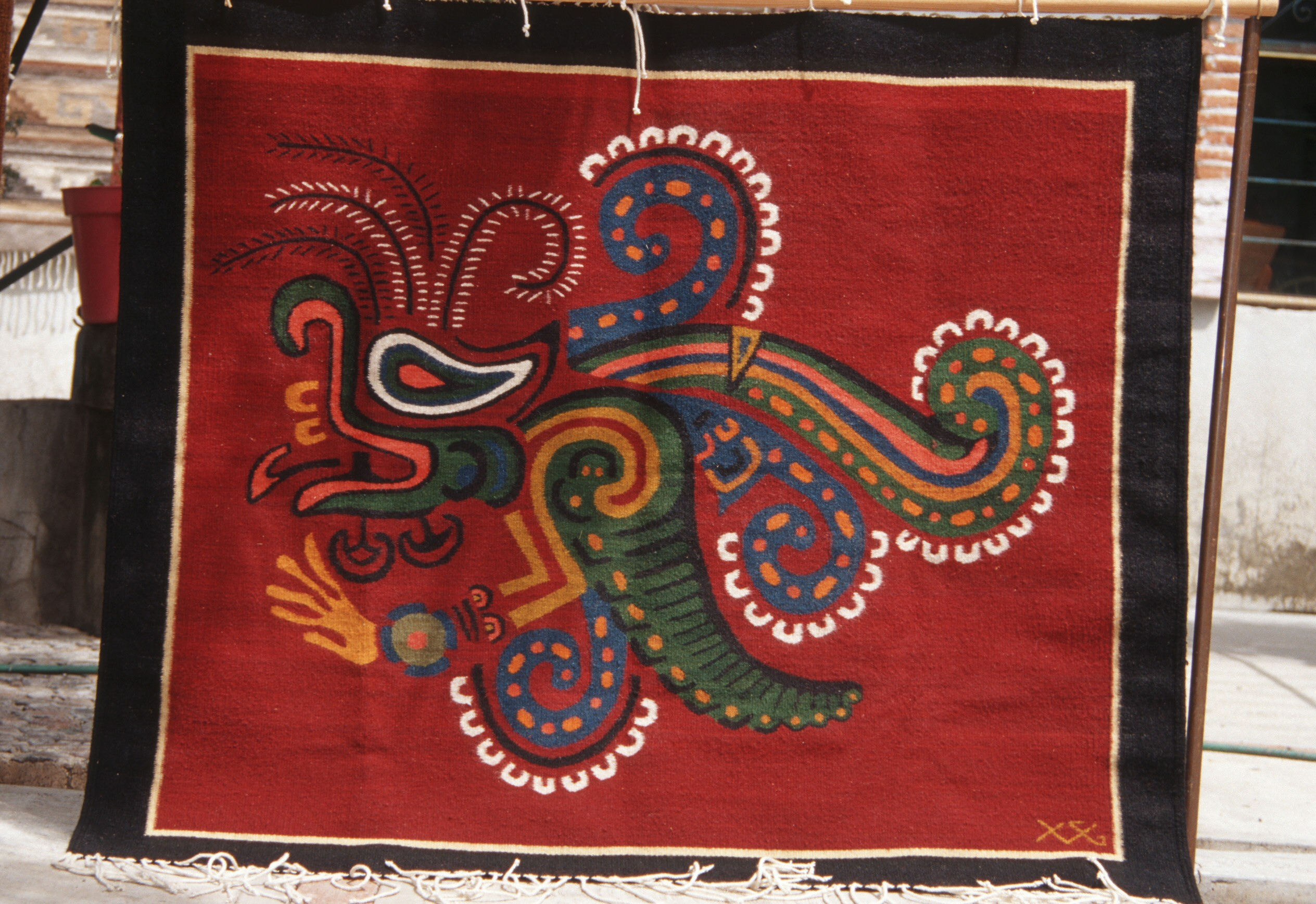
Olmec Butterfly by Isaac Vasquez Garcia

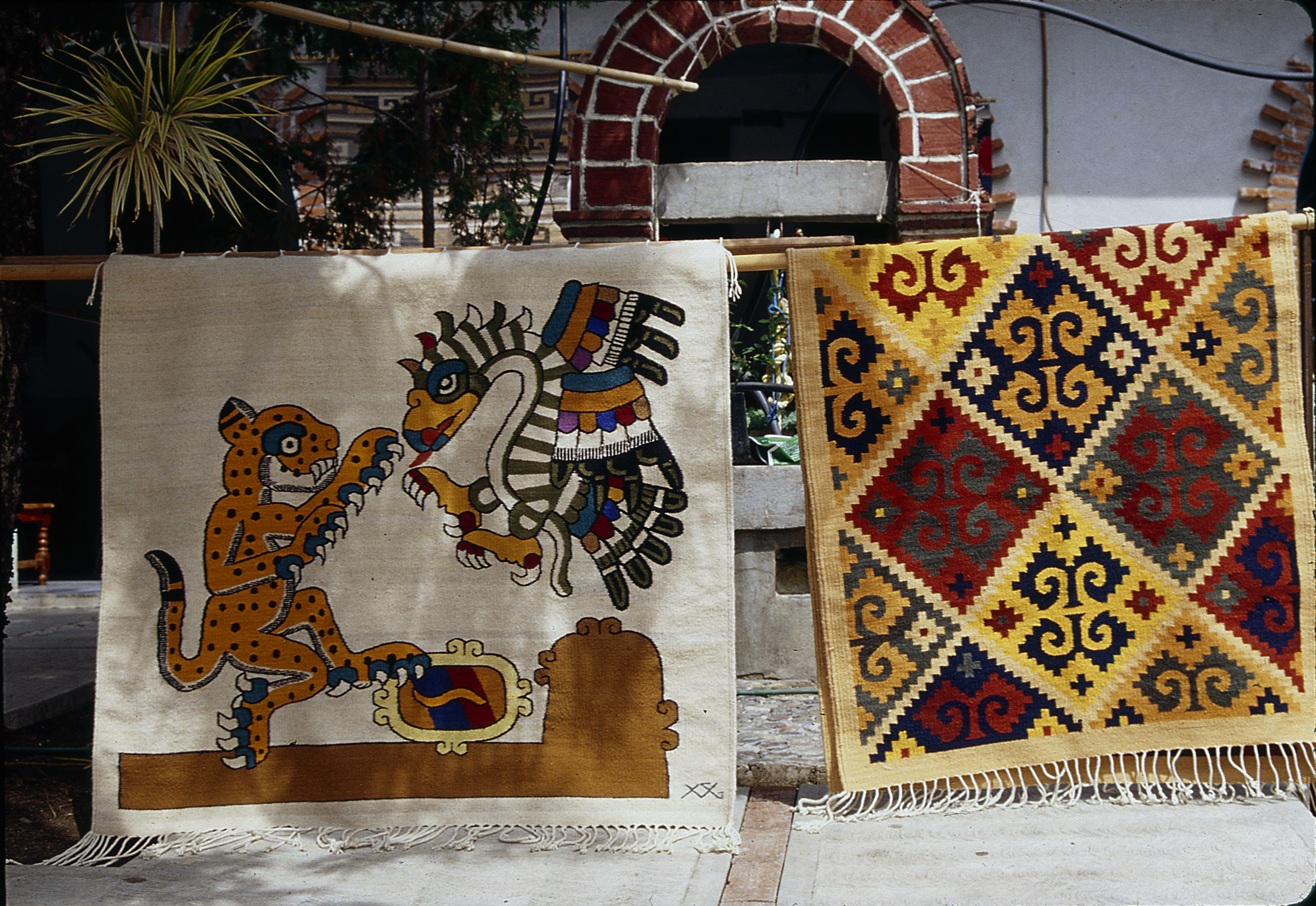
Codice and Zapotec diamond rugs by Isaac Vásquez García

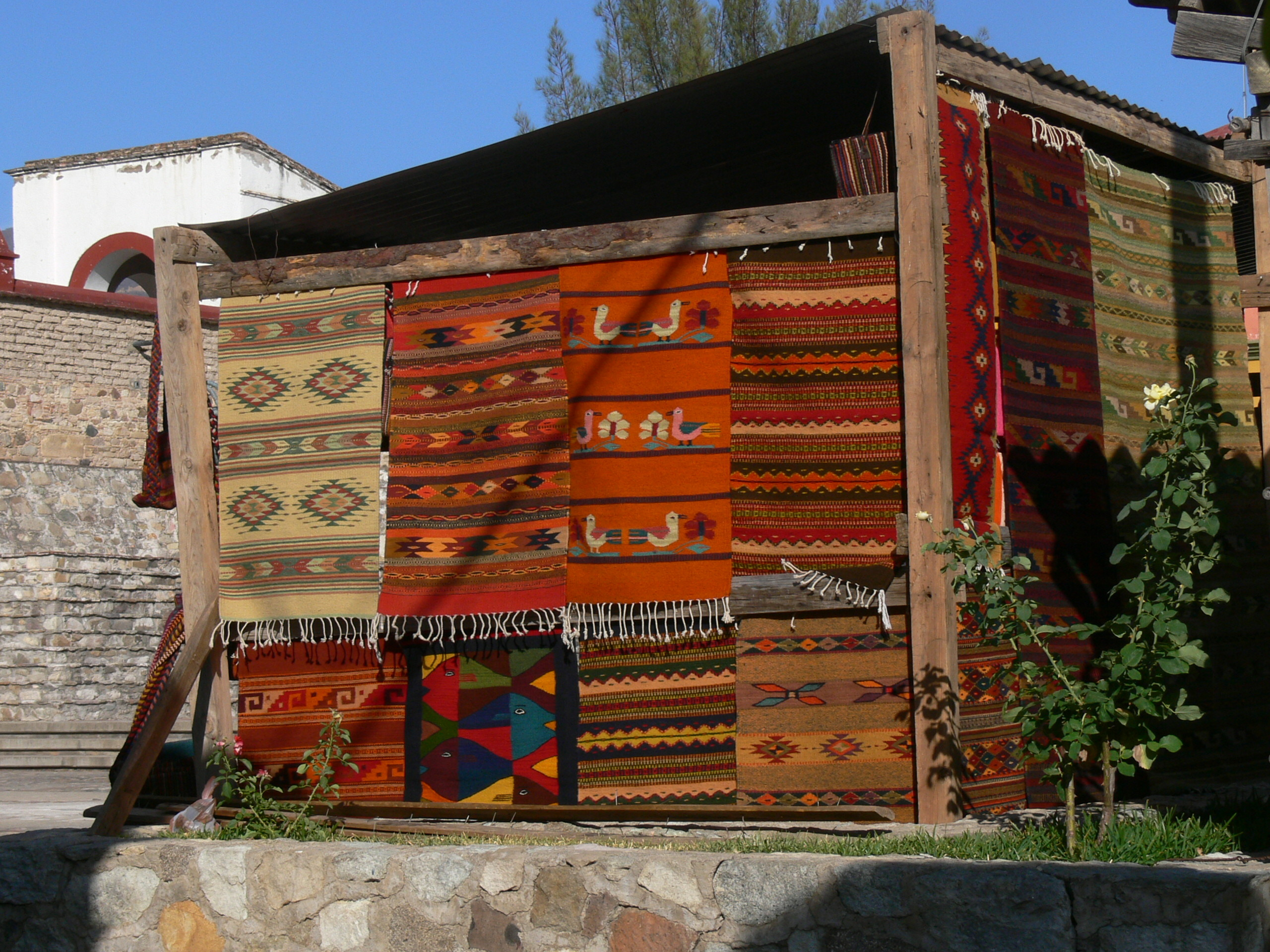
Finished rugs for sale

The community is famous for its weavings called “laadi” in the local language, with textiles as the main economic activity. This community is known for its woven wool rugs which use natural dyes such as those obtained by the cochineal insect. These rugs can have native indigenous motifs or more modern designs. The other main economic activity is agriculture.

Weaving in this village dates back at least until 500 BCE. The earliest weavings used cotton and ixtle and utilized the backstrap loom. Teotitlán would pay its financial tribute to the Aztecs in weavings. More modern weaving was introduced here by Dominican bishop Juan López Dezárate around 1535 when the bishop brought sheep and treadle looms to the area. The new materials and looms allowed for the weaving a large, heavy duty items such as rugs, serapes and blankets. Over time the village grew and began specializing solely in rugs to be used for trade or sale in markets of other towns in the other parts of the state. With the completion of the Pan-American Highway in the late 1940s, the area was connected with Mexico City, opening up markets. In the 1950s with air travel, tourists began coming to Oaxaca and taking interest in the crafts. A famed Zapotec weaver was Arnulfo Mendoza of Casa Serra Sagrada in Teotitlan, owner of La Mano Majica gallery in Oaxaca City.

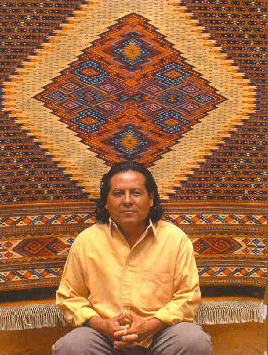
Arnulfo Mendoza

The rugs are handcrafted from wool and most of the designs are woven from the craftsmen's memory. Designs include Zapotec and Mixtec glyphs and fretwork, Navajo designs (a contentious issue) and more contemporary designed including reproductions of works by famous artists such as Picasso, Joan Miró, Matisse, Diego Rivera or Rufino Tamayo. The making of the rugs begins the washing of the raw wool to rid it of dirt and residues. Next it is carded then spun into yarn. The yarn is wound into large balls to prepare for dying with natural dyes such as those obtained from the needle bush, indigo, cochineal, “musgo de roca”, Brazilwood, Mexican marigold and others. some workshops use chemical dyes. The looms are hand-operated.

Weaving is done by both sexes in family workshops in which artisans of all ages participate in the work. About 150 families are involved in the craft, as well as several families that specialize in candle-making. One such workshop is the Artesanía Casa Santiago, located on the town's main street since 1966. Most weavers work in agriculture as well as weaving but increasing consumer demand has prompted some to spend more time weaving. Workshops such as these even take custom orders with images of modern items such as a request for a wall hanging promoting Pentax cameras.

Many of the workshops permit visitors to enter and see how the rugs and other textiles are made. Some of the workshops have broadened their offerings to include wall hangings, handbags, pillow covers, jackets, ponchos and dresses.

== The municipality ==
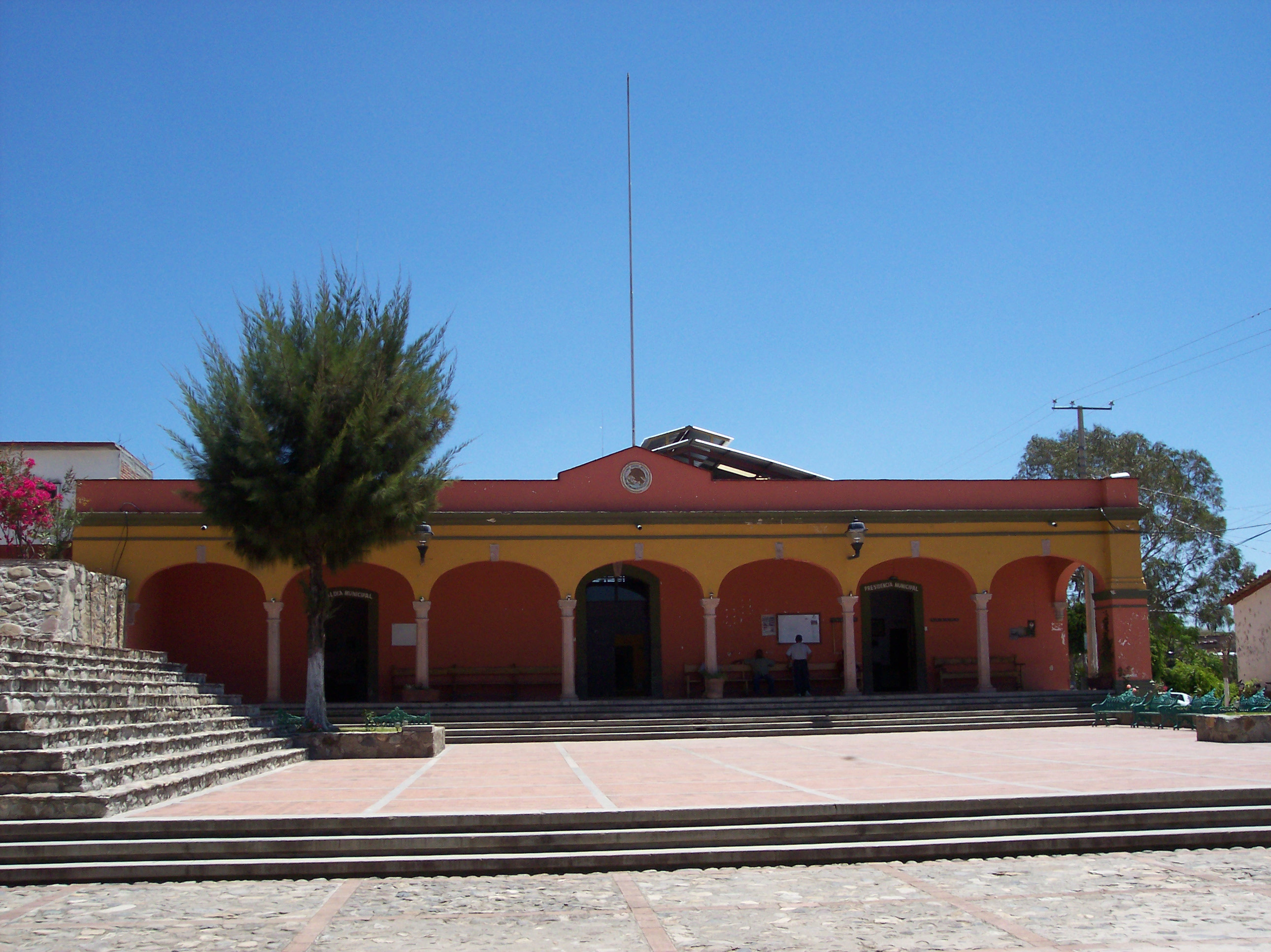
Municipal Palace

As the seat of a municipality, the town of Teotitlán del Valle is the governing authority over nine other named communities, which covers a territory of 81.54 km^{2}. The total municipal population is 5,601 of which 4,427 or 79% live in the town proper. The municipality is located in the Central Valleys region of Oaxaca, 31 km from the city of Oaxaca in the foothills of the Sierra Juárez mountains and the seat in located in a small level area in the same. The municipality borders the municipalities of Santa Catarina Lachatao, Santa Catarina Ixtepeji (Ixtlán District) San Jerónimo Tlacochahuaya, San Francisco Lachigoló, Santa María del Tule, Tlalixtac de Cabrera, Santo Domingo Tomaltepec and Villa Díaz Ordaz. Principle elevations include the Gueliaa, Cerro Grande Quiea Less and Dai-N Nizz. Rivers include the Grande, the Gueu-Liaa, Guen-Dzu, Gue Duin, La Tchuvi, the Gue Ve-U and Gue Ya with one dam called the Piedra Azul. It has a temperate climate similar to that of the city of Oaxaca. Vegetation here is mixed with a number of tree species. Wildlife is dominated by various bird species such as falcons, owls and ravens as well as small mammals such as opossums, skunks, and rabbits.

Most of the municipalities land is dedicated to agriculture, almost all of which is for local or family consumption. Sixty eight percent of the population is dedicated also to the elaboration of crafts, especially of wool rugs in Zapotec designs.

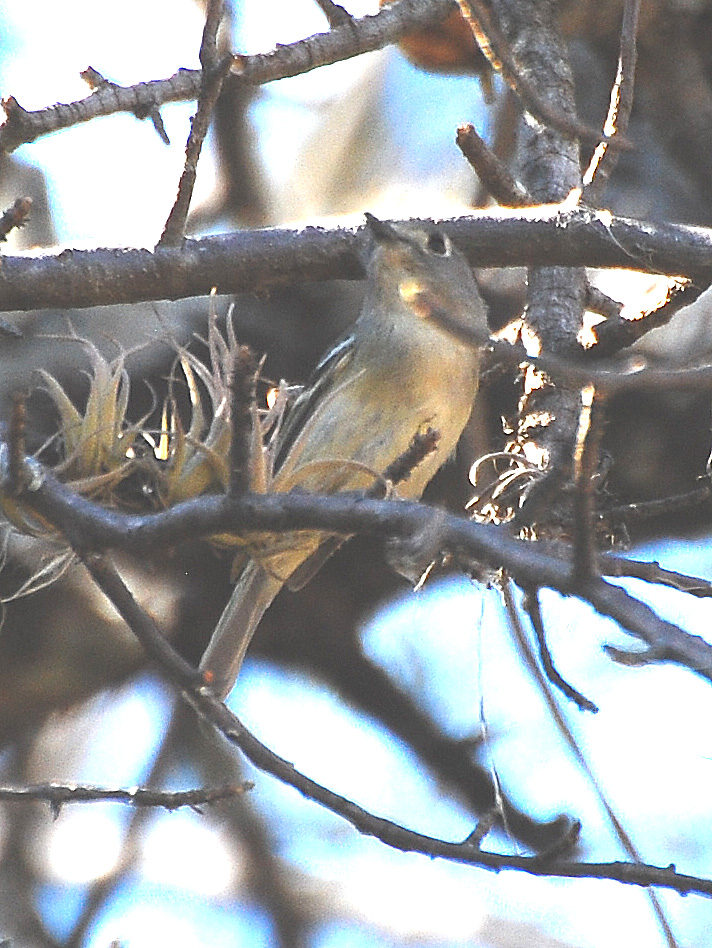
Dwarf vireo seen at Teotitlán

Many birders come to view birds, especially above the Piedra Azul Dam. They are mostly targeting the "dry interior" endemics, like ocellated thrasher, bridled sparrow, dwarf vireo, Oaxaca sparrow, Boucard's wren, gray-breasted woodpecker, slaty vireo, dusky hummingbird, and Sumichrast's scrub-jay. Birds can also been seen at the Benito Juárez dam when it fills during the rainy season in the summer. Winter months (November–March) are the best time to see migratory birds, including herons and kingfishers.

In addition to birdwatching, other activities available in the mountain areas include hiking, horseback riding and mountain biking.(inforamador) The two main attractions in the mountains are El Pichacho Peak, or Cerro Gie Bets (“stone brother” in Zapotec) and the Cuevita del Pedimento caves. Both are within hiking distance but permission is required and can be obtained from the community museum. El Picacho is considered to be sacred, and its peaks offers a wide view of the Tlacolula Valley. The Cuevita del Pedimento is a set of three caves that are customarily visited on New Year's in order to petition the image of the Virgin Mary there for favors for the following year.

One custom in this municipality is the concept of tequio or the performance of administrative duties without monetary compensation as a type of community service. These duties include acting as municipal president, which is a full-time commitment of three years.

== In media ==
Teotitlán del Valle is the setting for the Gideon Oliver novel Skull Duggery by Aaron Elkins.
