= Leioproctus criniventris =

Scientific classification
- Kingdom: Animalia
- Phylum: Arthropoda
- Clade: Pancrustacea
- Class: Insecta
- Order: Hymenoptera
- Family: Colletidae
- Genus: Leioproctus
- Species: L. criniventris

Binomial name
- Leioproctus criniventris Batley, 2025

Species of bee

Leioproctus criniventris, or Leioproctus (Euryglossidia) criniventris, is a species of bee in the family Colletidae and subfamily Colletinae. It is endemic to Australia. It was described by entomologist Michael Batley in 2025.

== Etymology ==
The specific epithet criniventris (Latin: "hairy venter") is an anatomical reference to the ventral metasoma.

== Description ==
The male body length is 10.5 mm, female body length 10.4 mm. Integumental colouration is mainly black and weakly iridescent, with brown and orange markings. The hair is white.

== Distribution and habitat ==
The species occurs in inland south-west Western Australia. The type locality is 5 km south-east of Thundelarra in the Murchison region.

== Behaviour ==
The adults are flying mellivores. Flowering plants visited by the bees include Hakea preissii, Leptospermopsis erubescens and Grevillea paniculata, as well as Acacia species.

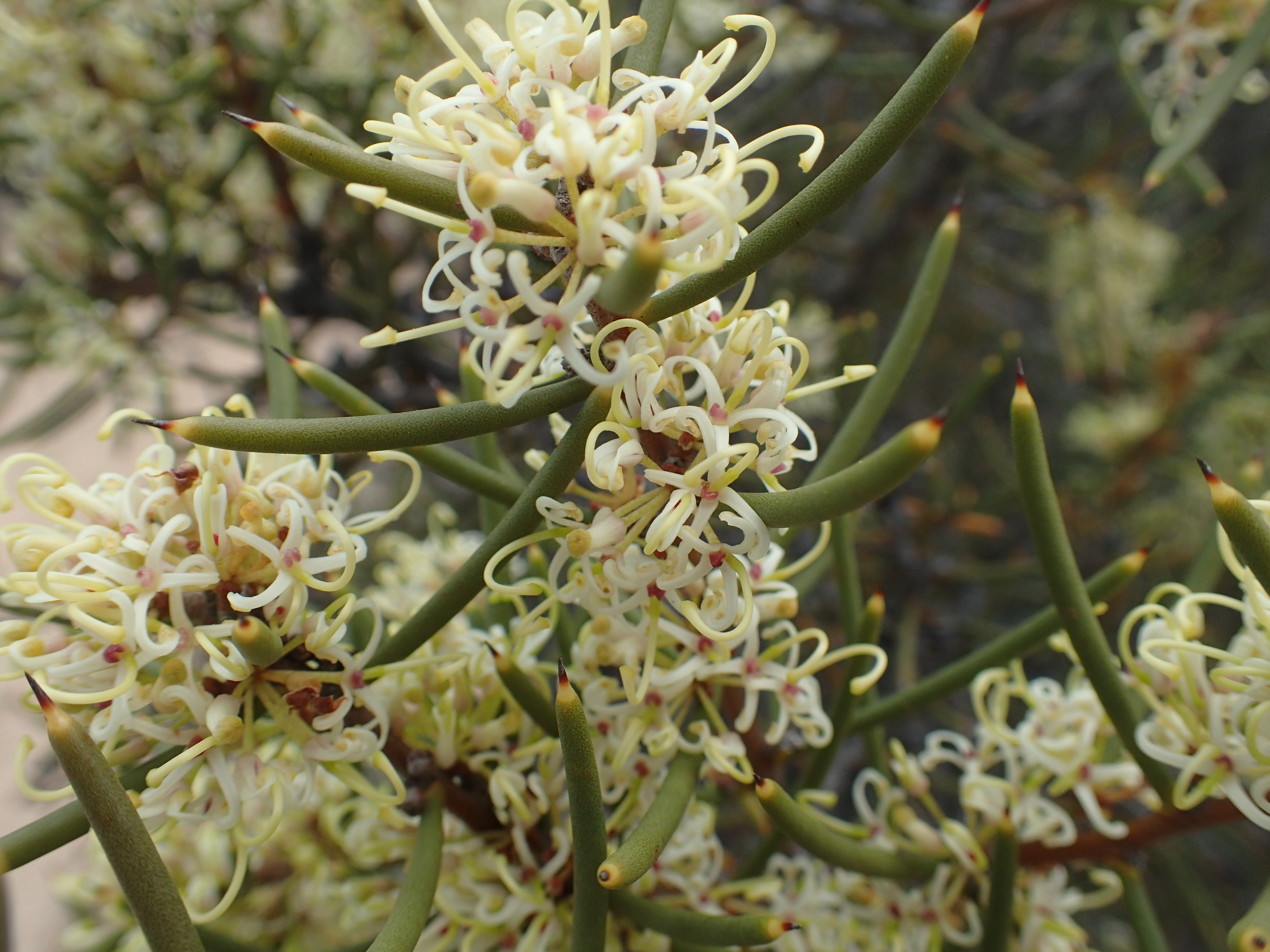
Flowers of Hakea preissii

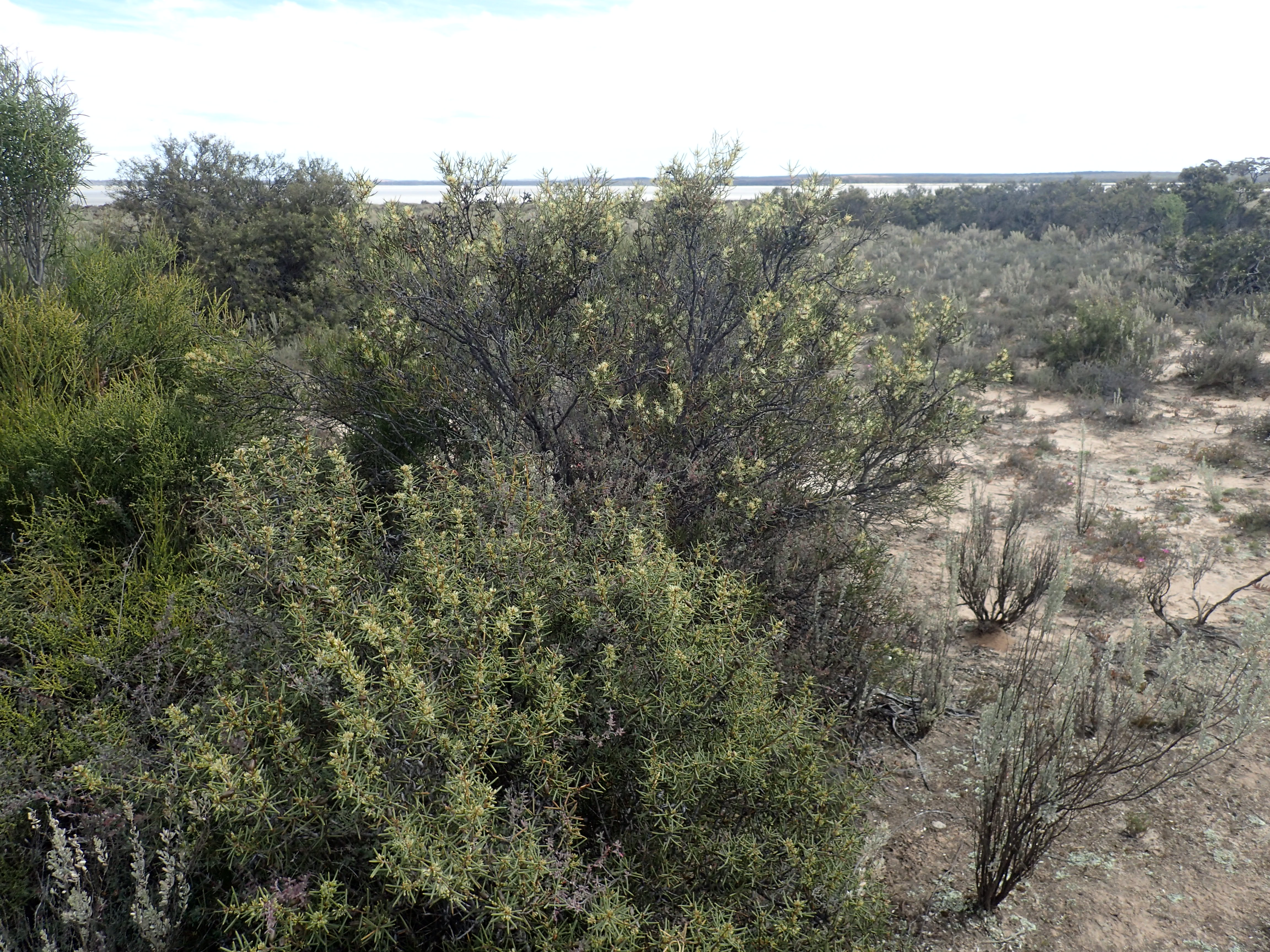
Hakea preissii (needle bush), a forage plant of the bees
