= Leioproctus pachyramus =

Scientific classification
- Kingdom: Animalia
- Phylum: Arthropoda
- Clade: Pancrustacea
- Class: Insecta
- Order: Hymenoptera
- Family: Colletidae
- Genus: Leioproctus
- Species: L. pachyramus

Binomial name
- Leioproctus pachyramus Batley, 2025

Species of bee

Leioproctus pachyramus, or Leioproctus (Euryglossidia) pachyramus, is a species of bee in the family Colletidae and subfamily Colletinae. It is endemic to Australia. It was described by entomologist Michael Batley in 2025.

== Etymology ==
The specific epithet pachyramus (Latin: "thick-branched") is an anatomical reference to the inner tooth of the claws.

== Description ==
The female body length is 6.6 mm. Integumental colouration is mainly black, with a dark brown metasoma. The hair is white to brown.

== Distribution and habitat ==
The species occurs in south-west Western Australia. The type locality is 15 km north of Westonia in the Wheatbelt.

== Behaviour ==
The adults are flying mellivores. Flowering plants visited by the bees include Grevillea teretifolia.

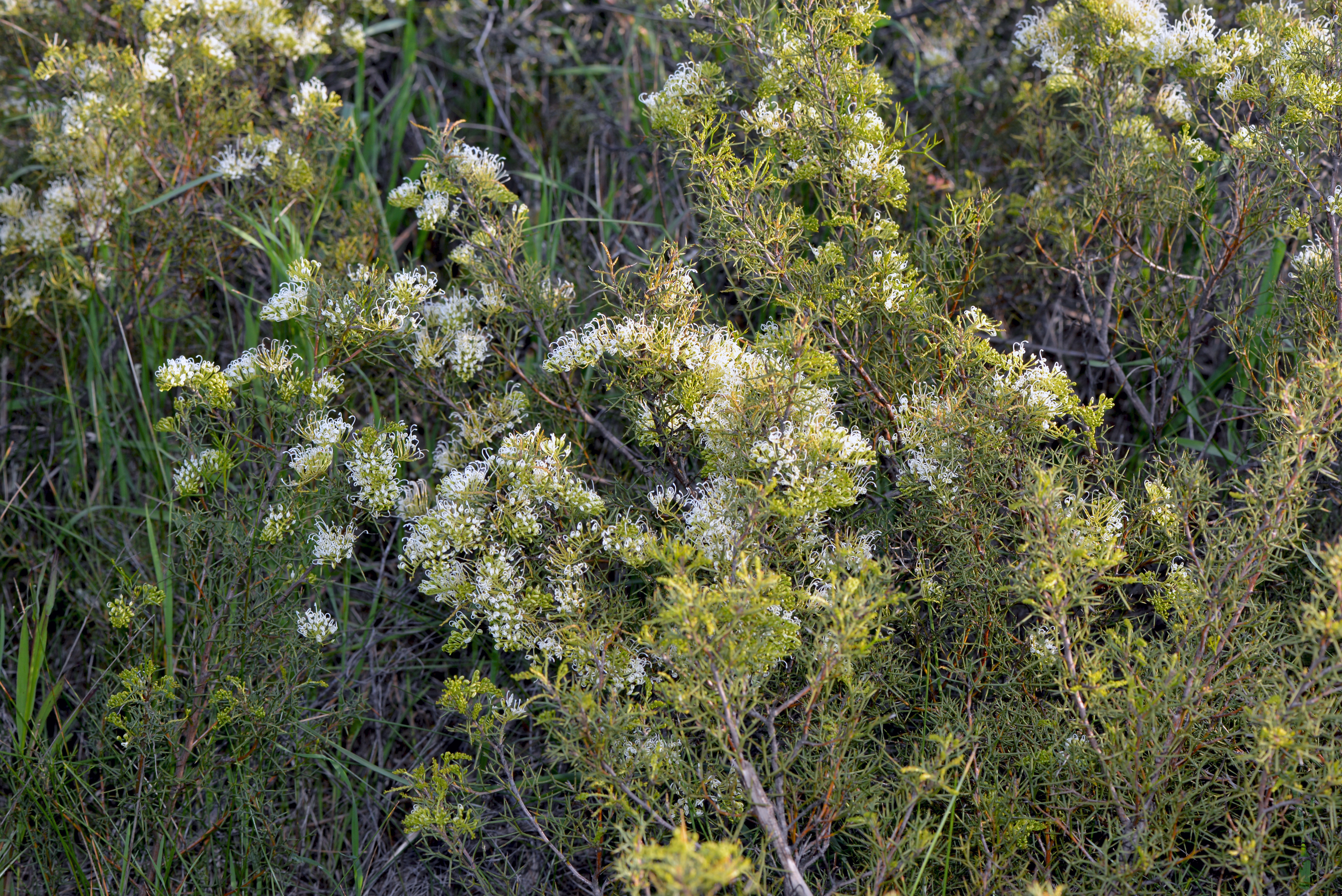
Grevillea teretifolia (round-leaf grevillea), a forage plant of the bees

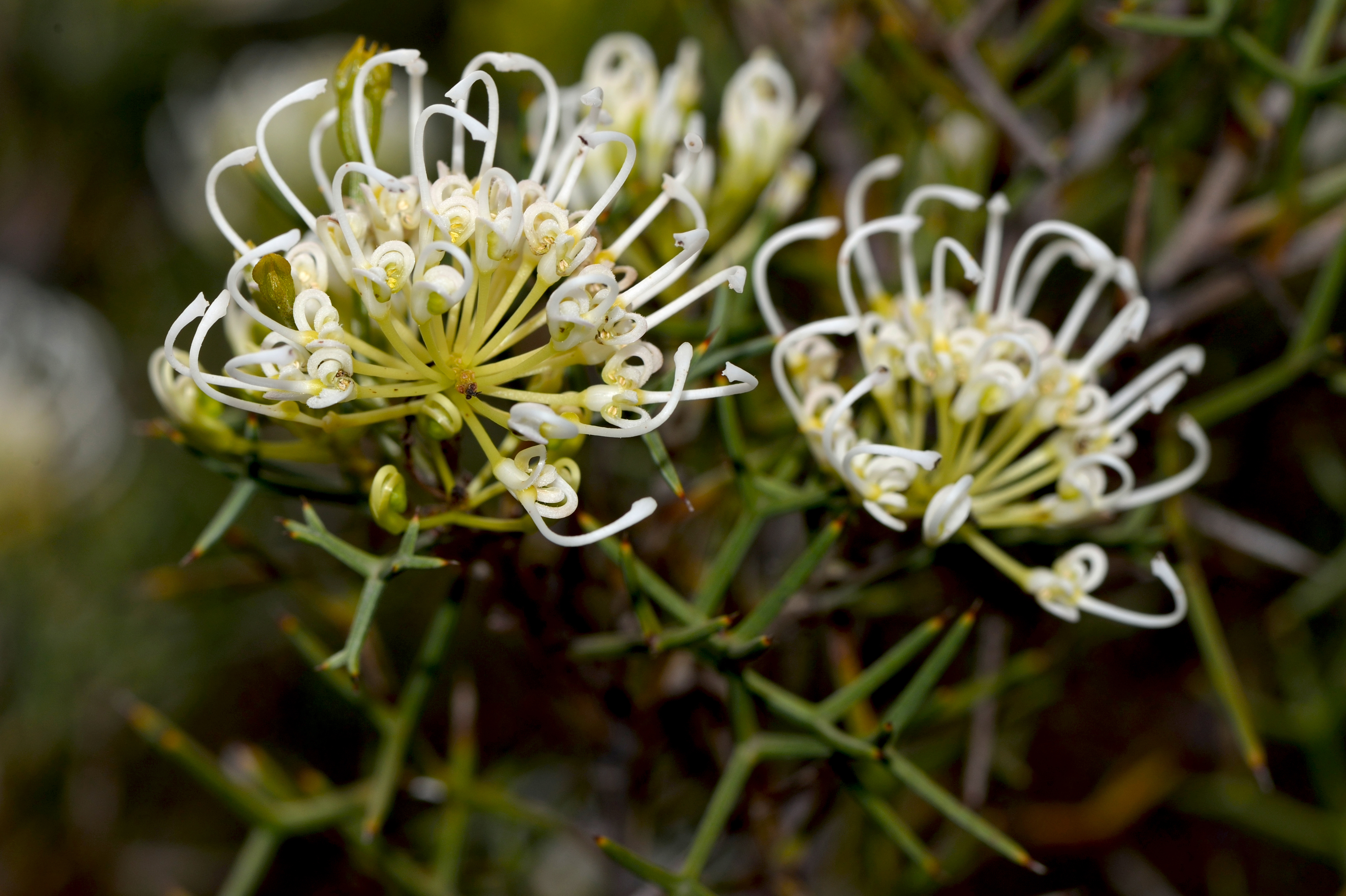
Flowers of Grevillea teretifolia
