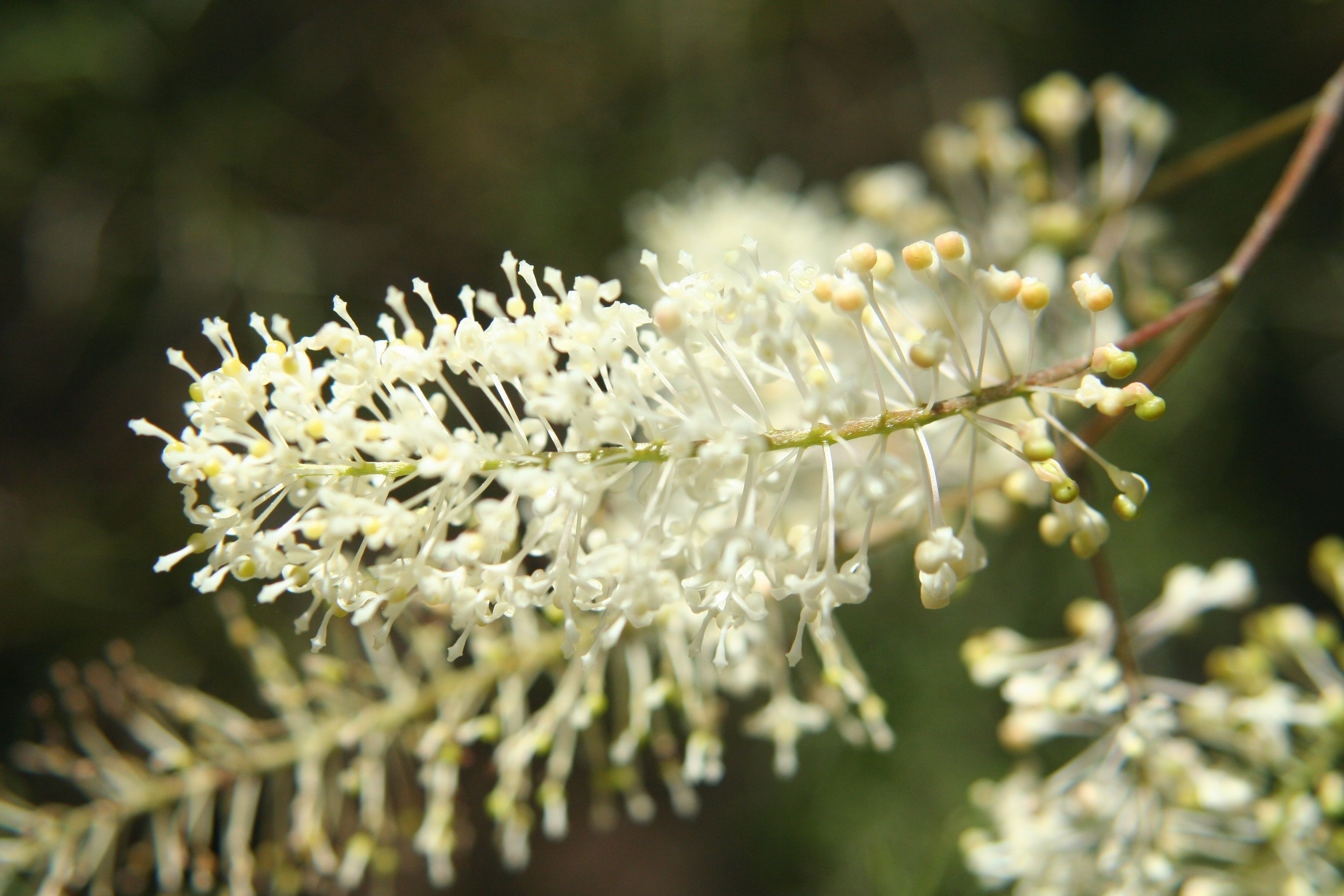

Conservation status
- Least Concern (IUCN 3.1)

- Priority Three — Poorly Known Taxa (DEC)

Scientific classification
- Kingdom: Plantae
- Clade: Embryophytes
- Clade: Tracheophytes
- Clade: Angiosperms
- Clade: Eudicots
- Order: Proteales
- Family: Proteaceae
- Genus: Grevillea
- Species: G. leptopoda

Binomial name
- Grevillea leptopoda McGill.

= Grevillea leptopoda =

Species of shrub endemic to Western Australia

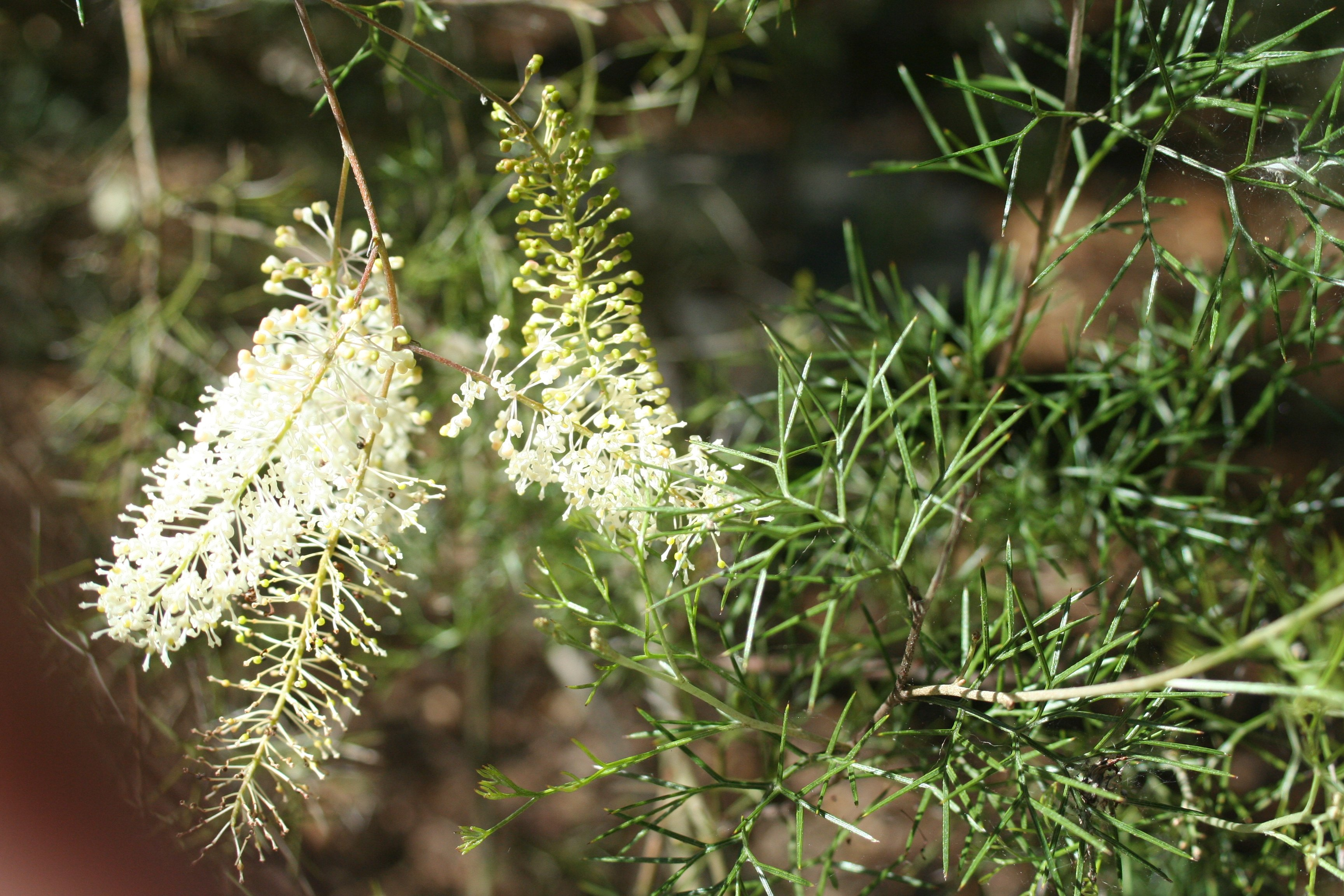
Flowers and leaves

Grevillea leptopoda is a species of flowering plant in the family Proteaceae and is endemic to the south-west of Western Australia. It is a spreading to erect shrub with divided leaves, the lobes further divided, the end lobes linear, and clusters of white to cream-coloured flowers.

== Description ==
Grevillea leptopoda is a spreading to erect shrub that typically grows to a height of 0.6–1.5 m (2 ft 0 in – 4 ft 11 in), its branchlets silky-hairy. The leaves are 40–80 mm (1.6–3.1 in) long and divided with three to five lobes, the side lobes usually further divided three times, the end lobes linear or tapered, 5–45 mm (0.20–1.77 in) long and 0.6–1.2 mm (0.024–0.047 in) wide. The flowers are arranged on the ends of branches and in leaf axils in sometimes branched clusters on a rachis 40–60 mm (1.6–2.4 in) long. The flowers are white to cream-coloured, the pistil 7.5–9 mm (0.30–0.35 in) long. Flowering occurs from August to November and the fruit is an oblong follicle 9–10.5 mm (0.35–0.41 in) long.

This grevillea is similar to G. teretifolia which has a rachis 10–30 mm (0.39–1.18 in) long and pistil 10–17 mm (0.39–0.67 in) long.

== Taxonomy ==
Grevillea leptopoda was first formally described in 1986 by Donald McGillivray in his New Names in Grevillea (Proteaceae) from specimens collected near the Brand Highway north of Carnamah in 1953. The specific epithet (leptopoda) means "slender foot", referring to the thin flower pedicels.

== Distribution and habitat ==
This grevillea is found from Kalbarri south to Moora, growing among medium to low trees in tall shrubland, mallee or heathland. It will grow in rocky, stony or sandy lateritic soils.

== Conservation status ==
Grevillea leptopoda is listed as 'Priority Three' by the Government of Western Australia Department of Biodiversity, Conservation and Attractions, meaning that it is poorly known and known from only a few locations but is not under imminent threat, but as 'Least Concern' in the IUCN Red List.

== Use in horticulture ==
This species has heavily scented flowers and is used in domestic gardens in warmer areas.

== See also ==
- List of Grevillea species
