= Leioproctus bracteatus =

Scientific classification
- Kingdom: Animalia
- Phylum: Arthropoda
- Clade: Pancrustacea
- Class: Insecta
- Order: Hymenoptera
- Family: Colletidae
- Genus: Leioproctus
- Species: L. bracteatus

Binomial name
- Leioproctus bracteatus Batley, 2025

Species of bee

Leioproctus bracteatus, or Leioproctus (Euryglossidia) bracteatus, is a species of bee in the family Colletidae and subfamily Colletinae. It is endemic to Australia. It was described by entomologist Michael Batley in 2025.

== Etymology ==
The specific epithet bracteatus (Latin: "gilt") refers to the colour of the scutal integument.

== Description ==
Female body length is 7.7 mm. Integumental colouration is mainly black, with the scutum iridescent gold. The hair is white, golden-brown and dark brown.

== Distribution and habitat ==
The species occurs in inland southern Western Australia. The type locality is 30 km north of Bullfinch in the eastern Wheatbelt region.

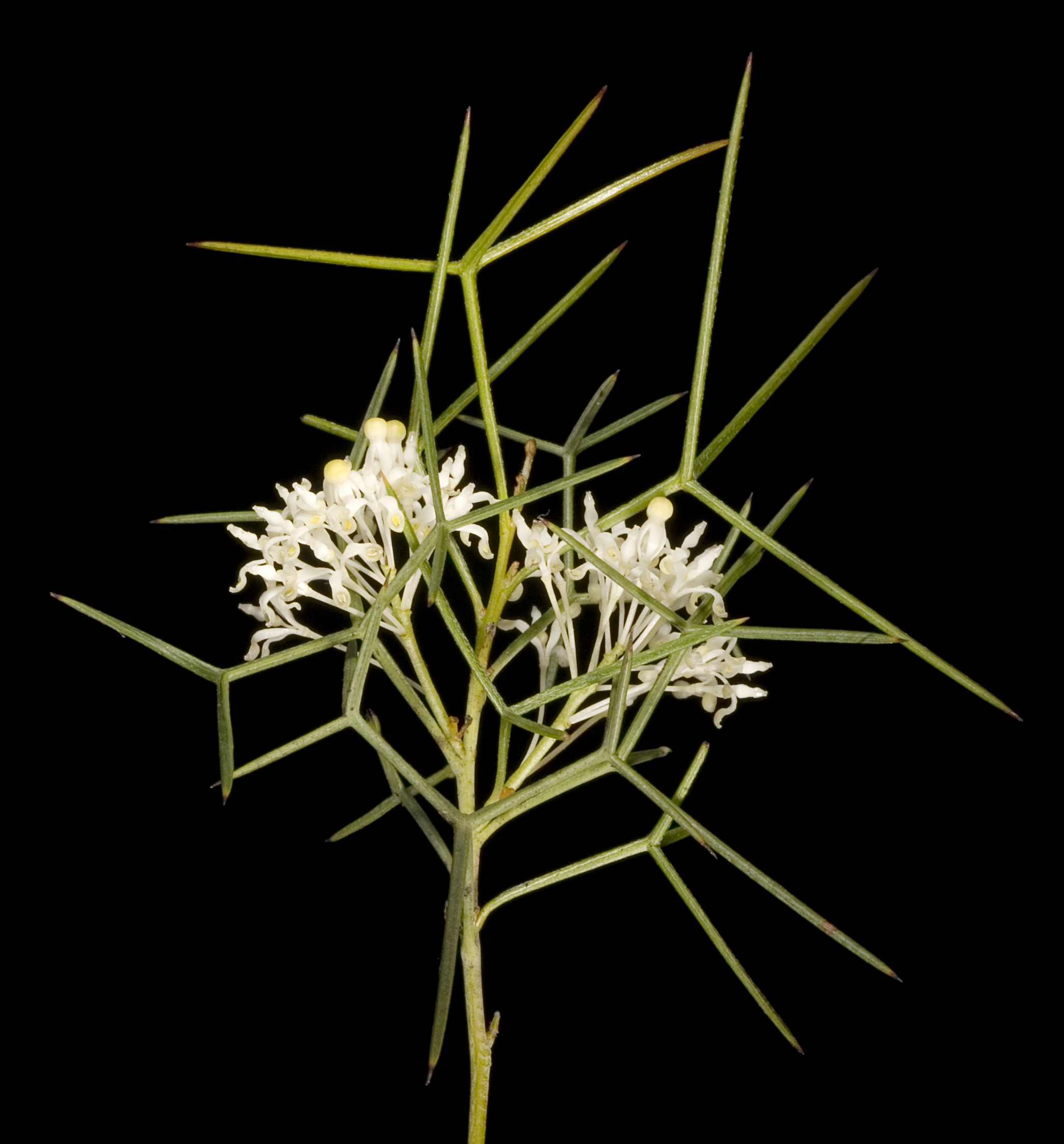
Flowers of Grevillea paniculata

== Behaviour ==
The adults are flying mellivores. Flowering plants visited by the bees include Grevillea paniculata.

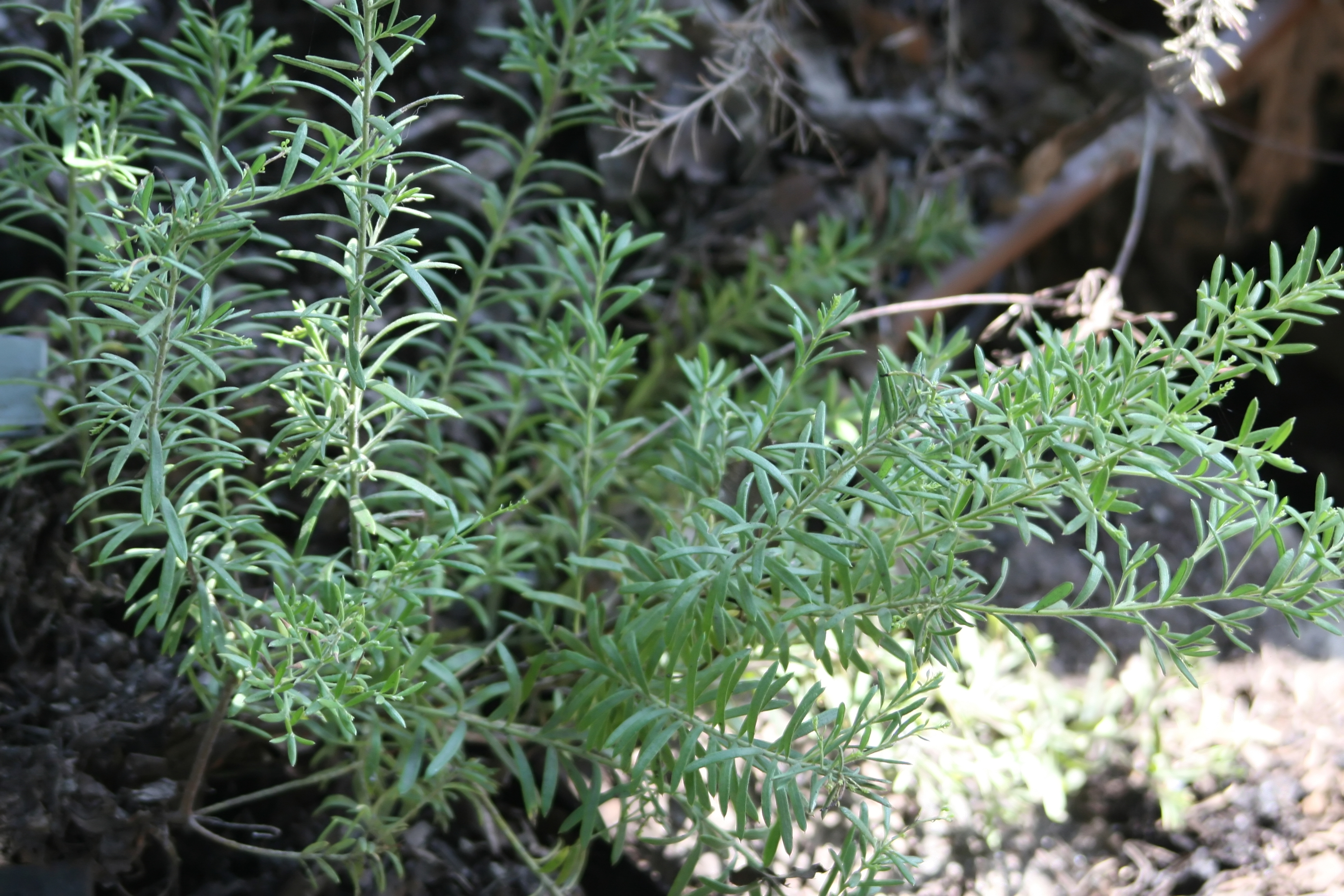
Grevillea paniculata (kerosene bush), a forage plant of the bees
