= Leioproctus flavipedatus =

Scientific classification
- Kingdom: Animalia
- Phylum: Arthropoda
- Clade: Pancrustacea
- Class: Insecta
- Order: Hymenoptera
- Family: Colletidae
- Genus: Leioproctus
- Species: L. flavipedatus

Binomial name
- Leioproctus flavipedatus Batley, 2025

Species of bee

Leioproctus flavipedatus, or Leioproctus (Euryglossidia) flavipedatus, is a species of bee in the family Colletidae and subfamily Colletinae. It is endemic to Australia. It was described by entomologist Michael Batley in 2025.

== Etymology ==
The specific epithet flavipedatus (Latin: "yellow-footed") is an anatomical reference to the yellow-brown fore basitarsus.

== Description ==
The male body length is 5.8 mm, female body length 6 mm. Integumental colouration is mainly black, yellow-brown ventrally. The hair is mostly white.

== Distribution and habitat ==
The species occurs in south-west Western Australia. The type locality is Durokoppin Nature Reserve in the Wheatbelt.

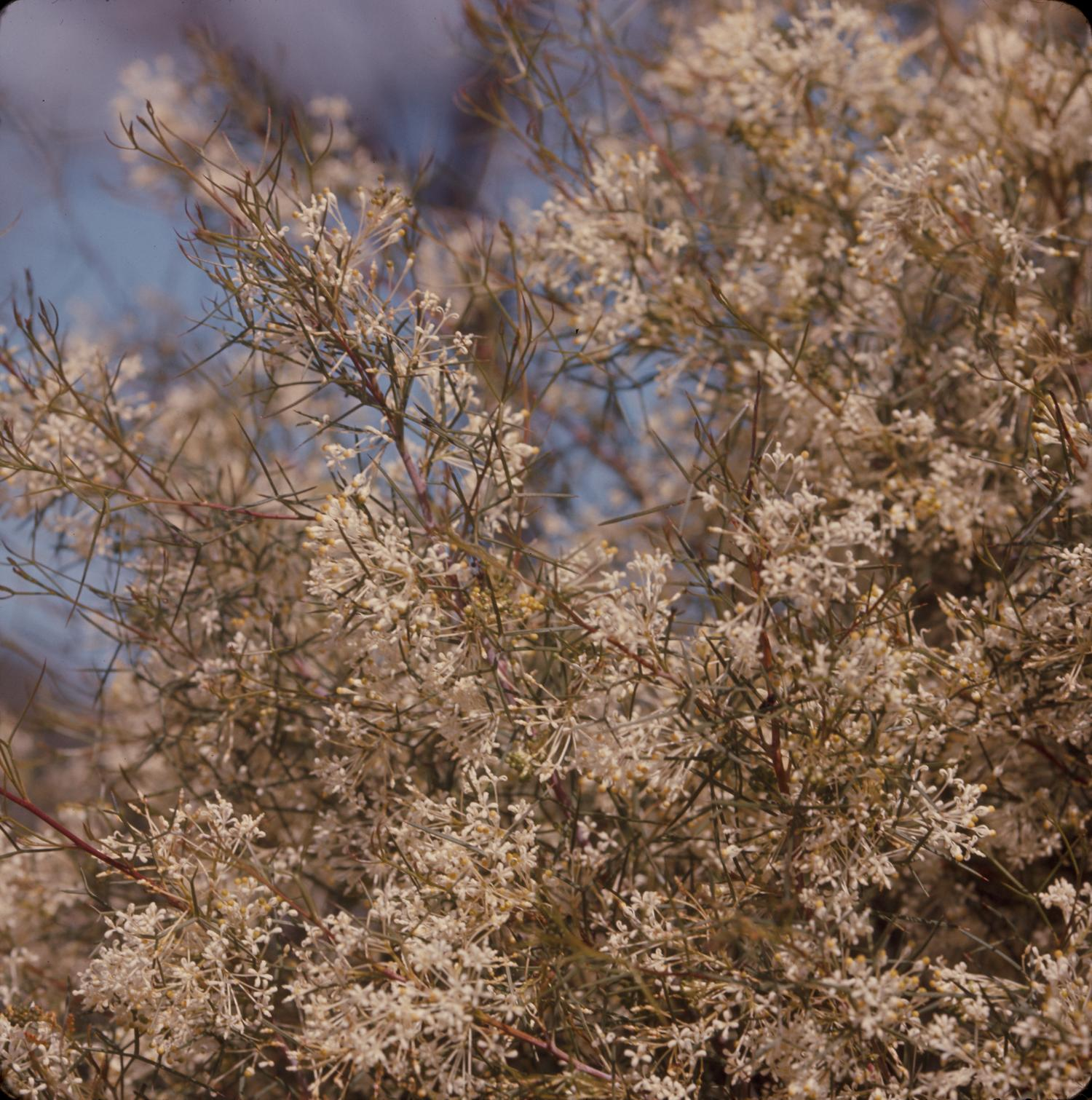
Grevillea paniculata (kerosene bush), a forage plant of the bees

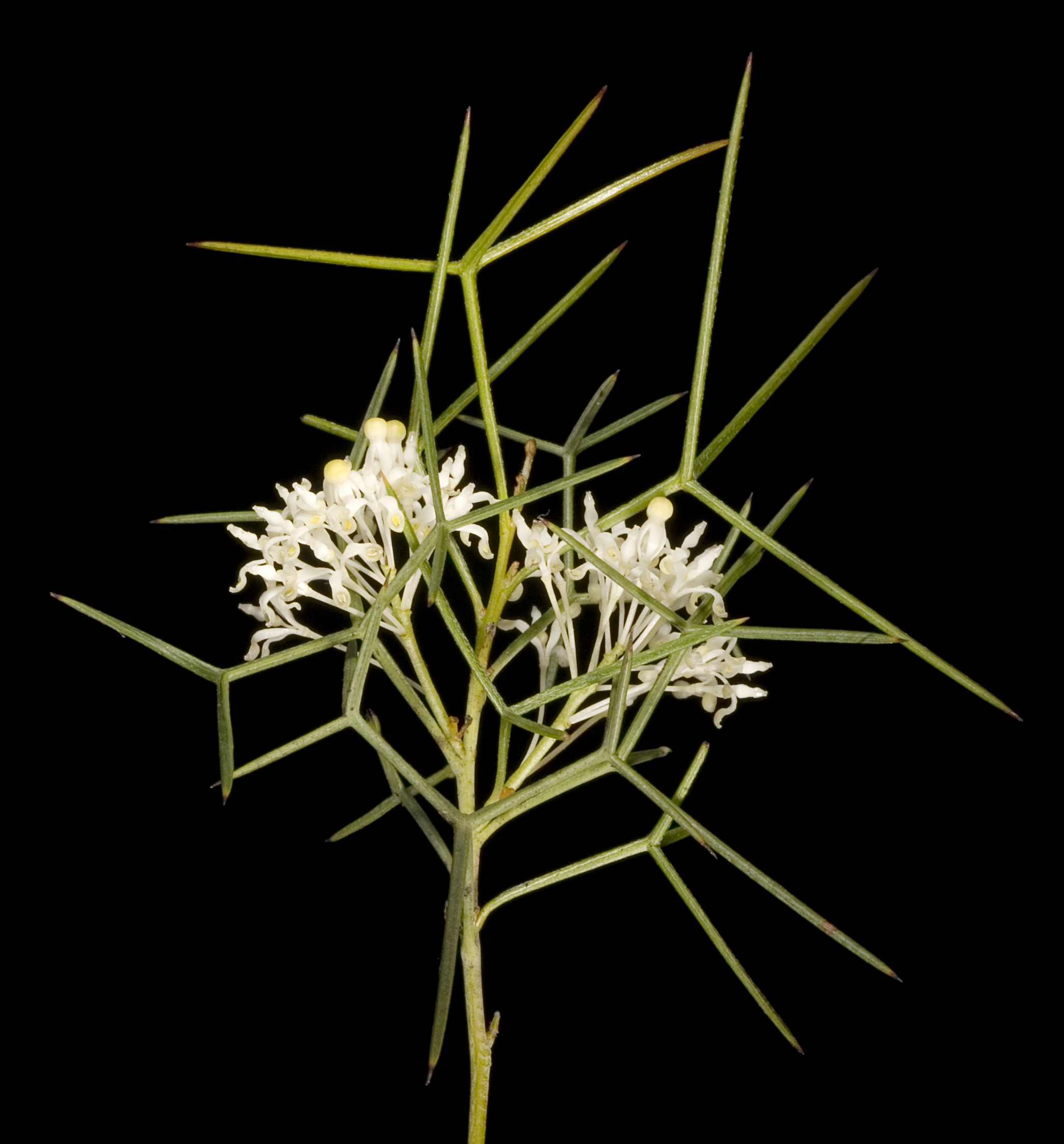
Flowers of Grevillea paniculata

== Behaviour ==
The adults are flying mellivores. Flowering plants visited by the bees include Grevillea paniculata and Hakea species.
