= Abigail Mendoza Ruiz =

Zapotec chef and restaurateur

Abigail Mendoza in 2023

Abigail Mendoza Ruiz (also known as Abigail Mendoza) is a Zapotec chef and co-owner of restaurant Tlamanalli, which she runs with her sisters, in Teotitlán del Valle, Mexico, near Oaxaca. She opened Tlamanalli in February 1990 in order to serve traditional Zapotec cuisine such as mole and squash blossom soup. The restaurant was soon featured in Gourmet magazine. In 1993, her restaurant received a write-up by food critic Molly O'Neill in the New York Times.

Mendoza Ruiz has since traveled to France to demonstrate Zapotec cooking. She was profiled in Anthony Bourdain's series Anthony Bourdain: Parts Unknown, featured in a documentary about British food writer Diana Kennedy, and shown on a digital cover of Vogue Mexico and Latin America for the magazine's 20th anniversary.

Mendoza Ruiz was born in the 1960s and learned to cook by watching her mother and aunt in the kitchen.

In 2023 the Mexican Federal Government awarded her the National Prize for Arts in the Popular Arts and Traditions category.
