= Needle bush =

Needle bush is a common name for several plants and may refer to:

- Hakea lissosperma, native to Tasmania and southeastern Australia
- Hakea preissii native to Western Australia
- Vachellia farnesiana, native to the Americas but widely naturalized in tropical regions

== See also ==
- Pincushion tree
