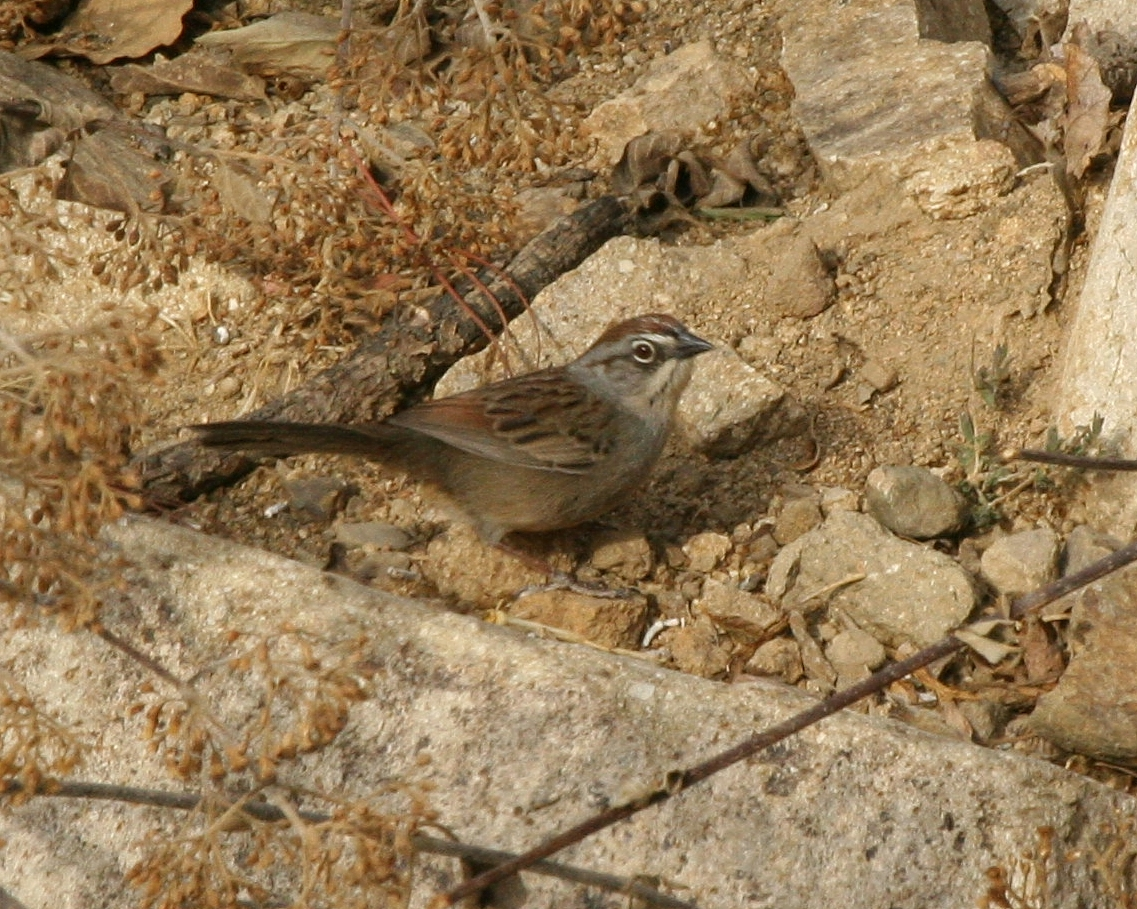

Conservation status
- Least Concern (IUCN 3.1)

Scientific classification
- Kingdom: Animalia
- Phylum: Chordata
- Class: Aves
- Order: Passeriformes
- Family: Passerellidae
- Genus: Aimophila
- Species: A. notosticta

Binomial name
- Aimophila notosticta (Sclater, PL & Salvin, 1868)

= Oaxaca sparrow =

Species of bird

The Oaxaca sparrow (Aimophila notosticta) is a species of bird in the family Passerellidae, the New World sparrows. It is endemic to southern Mexico.

== Taxonomy and systematics ==
The Oaxaca sparrow was formally described in 1868 with the binomial Peucaea notosticta. It was later reassigned by some authors to genus Ammodramus and then in 1901 to its present Aimophila.

The Oaxaca sparrow is monotypic.

== Description ==
The Oaxaca sparrow is 15 to 16.5 cm (5.9 to 6.5 in) long and weighs 26 to 30 g (0.92 to 1.1 oz). The sexes have the same plumage. Adults have a reddish brown crown with thin black streaks and a thin gray stripe in its middle. They have dark brown lores, a white streak above the lores, a white eye-ring, and a dark brown stripe behind the eye on an otherwise brownish gray to light gray face. Their back is grayish brown with wide black streaks. Their wings are mostly grayish brown with chestnut brown or rufous edges on the secondaries and tertials. Their wing's greater coverts are dark brown with paler outer edges. Their tail is dark brown. Their chin, throat, and belly are buffy whitish with a blackish stripe on the side of the throat. They have a dark brown iris, a black bill with sometimes a pale gray mandible, and pinkish legs and feet. Juveniles are overall duller and buffier than adults. Their crown and nape have thin black streaks, their upperparts are dense with thin dark brown streaks, and their lower throat, breast, and flanks have a pale yellowish wash and thin dark brown streaks. They have a paler bill than adults.

== Distribution and habitat ==
The Oaxaca sparrow is known from several individual sites in central and northwestern Oaxaca. Though some sources say that it is not known (but possible to probable) in adjoining southwestern Puebla, there are several eBird records with photographs from that state. The species inhabits arid and semi-arid oak scrub, oak-thorn scrub, and open woodland. Sources differ slightly on its elevational range. A twentieth century one places it between 1,500 and 1,900 m (4,900 and 6,200 ft), a 2006 field guide between 1,500 and 2,000 m (4,900 and 6,600 ft), and a 2020 source between 1,600 and 1,900 m (5,200 and 6,200 ft).

== Behavior ==
=== Movement ===
The Oaxaca sparrow is a year-round resident.

=== Feeding ===
The Oaxaca sparrow's diet has not been studied but is believed to be seeds, insects, spiders, and fruits. It feeds on the ground, usually singly or in pairs.

=== Breeding ===
The Oaxaca sparrow's breeding season is not known but apparently spans at least May to August. Nothing else is known about the species' breeding biology.

=== Vocalization ===
The Oaxaca sparrow's song is an "ultra high sharp tsjéeh-wehwehwehweehweeh". Another rendering is "swi chi-chi-chi-chi-chi chu-chu-chut". Its calls include "a slightly nasal, dry scolding chatter shasha ... or chehcheh ... [a] prolonged chattering chii-i-i-i-i-i-ir, accelerating and slowing, and a high, thin tik".

== Status ==
The IUCN originally in 1994 assessed the Oaxaca sparrow as Near Threatened but since 2013 as being of Least Concern. Its estimated population of at least 20,000 mature individuals is believed to be decreasing. "Significant tracts of dry forest and arid scrub remain, but are under pressure from cutting of vegetation for timber and firewood, as well as from clearance for cattle-ranching. However, most of the species's habitat is situated on very steep slopes, thus limiting the impact of these threats." It has been described with abundances ranging from very uncommon through fairly common to common.
