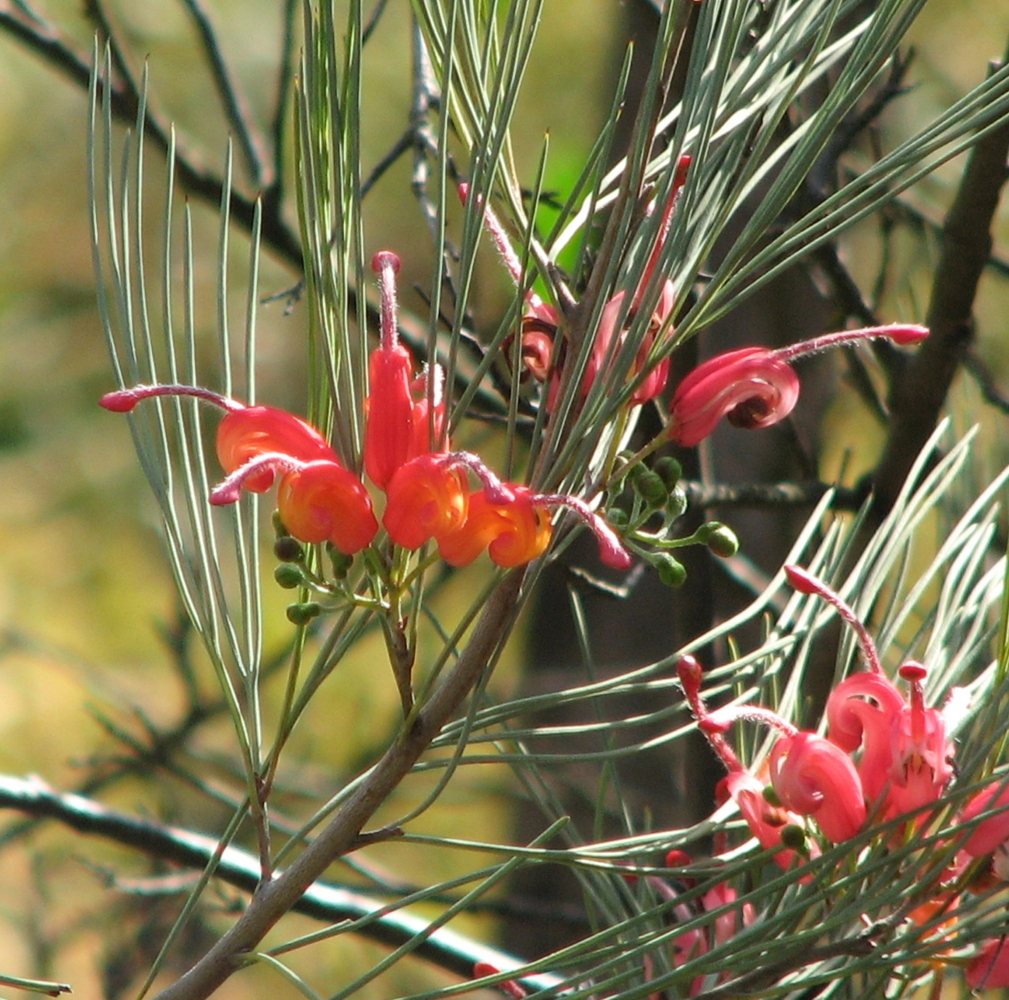
- In Maranoa Gardens

Conservation status
- Vulnerable (IUCN 3.1)

- Priority Four — Rare Taxa (DEC)

Scientific classification
- Kingdom: Plantae
- Clade: Embryophytes
- Clade: Tracheophytes
- Clade: Spermatophytes
- Clade: Angiosperms
- Clade: Eudicots
- Order: Proteales
- Family: Proteaceae
- Genus: Grevillea
- Species: G. erectiloba

Binomial name
- Grevillea erectiloba F.Muell.

= Grevillea erectiloba =

Species of shrub endemic to Western Australia

Grevillea erectiloba is a species of flowering plant in the family Proteaceae and is endemic to inland areas of south-west of Western Australia. It is dense, rounded shrub with divided leaves with up to fifteen linear lobes, and groups of bright red flowers that are green in the bud stage.

== Description ==
Grevillea erectiloba is a dense, rounded shrub that typically grows to a height of 1–3 mm (0.039–0.118 in). Its leaves are 50–120 mm (2.0–4.7 in) long and deeply divided with five to fifteen erect, linear lobes 30–75 mm (1.2–3.0 in) long and 0.6–0.9 mm (0.024–0.035 in) wide with two longitudinal grooves near the edges. The flowers are arranged in groups of four to ten on a rachis 2–8 mm (0.079–0.315 in) long and are bright green in the bud stage, turning red as the flowers open, the pistil 25.5–35 mm (1.00–1.38 in) long. Flowering occurs from September to November and the fruit is an elliptic follicle 8–11 mm (0.31–0.43 in) long.

== Taxonomy ==
Grevillea erectiloba was first formally described in 1876 by Ferdinand von Mueller in Fragmenta Phytographiae Australiae, based on plant material collected between Mount Jackson and Ullaring by Jess Young. The specific epithet (erectiloba) means "upright-lobed".

== Distribution and habitat ==
This grevillea grows in semi-arid shrubland between Mount Jackson and Lake Barlee in the Coolgardie and Murchison biogeographic regions of inland south-western Western Australia.

== Conservation status ==
Grevillea erectiloba is listed as vulnerable on the IUCN Red List of Threatened Species, as the population is estimated to consist of fewer than 1,000 mature individuals. However, its population is believed to be stable within its small range and it can be locally common. There are no known threats currently affecting this species, though there is the potential future threat of habitat destruction and species mortality through mining, which occurred in the past near Mt. Jackson. This mine is currently no longer in operation. Though the species does not currently occur within any protected areas, there is a proposal for a national park that would encompass much of the species' distribution.

It is also classified as priority four by the Government of Western Australia Department of Biodiversity, Conservation and Attractions, meaning that it is rare or near threatened.
