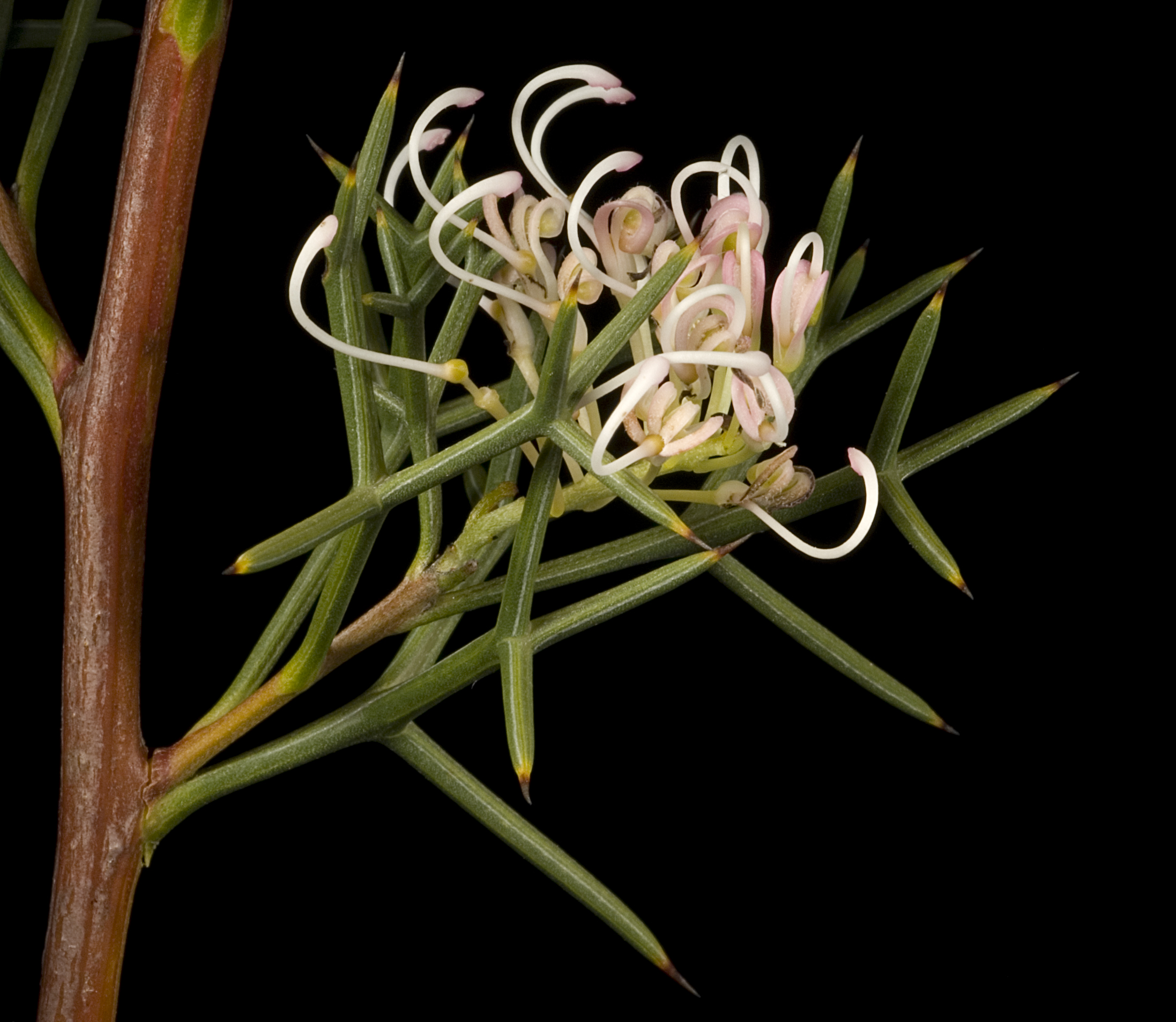
- Grevillea teretifolia

Scientific classification
- Kingdom: Plantae
- Clade: Tracheophytes
- Clade: Angiosperms
- Clade: Eudicots
- Order: Proteales
- Family: Proteaceae
- Genus: Grevillea
- Species: G. teretifolia

Binomial name
- Grevillea teretifolia Meisn.

= Grevillea teretifolia =

Round leaf grevillea

Species of shrub endemic to Western Australia

Grevillea teretifolia, commonly known as round leaf grevillea, is species of flowering plant in the family Proteaceae and is endemic to the southwest of Western Australia. It is an erect to spreading shrub with many stems, divided leaves, the end lobes sharply pointed and more or less cylindrical, and clusters of white or pale pink flowers.

== Description ==
Grevillea teretifolia is erect to spreading shrub that typically grows to a height of 0.6–2 m (2 ft 0 in – 6 ft 7 in) and has many stems. Its leaves are 25–50 mm (0.98–1.97 in) long and divided with 3 lobes, each lobe often divided again, the end lobes linear to more or less cylindrical, 5–30 mm (0.20–1.18 in) long, 0.7–1.3 mm (0.028–0.051 in) wide and sharply pointed. The flowers are arranged in sometimes branched clusters on the ends of branches or in leaf axils on a rachis usually 10–20 mm (0.39–0.79 in) long, the flowers at the base of the rachis flowering first. The flowers are usually white, sometimes pink, the pistil 10–17 mm (0.39–0.67 in) long. Flowering mostly occurs from June to November, and the fruit is a wrinkled, oblong to oval follicle 9–13.5 mm (0.35–0.53 in) long.

== Taxonomy ==
Grevillea teretifolia was first formally described by the botanist Carl Meissner in 1848 in Lehmann's Plantae Preissianae, the type specimen collected by James Drummond in the Swan River Colony. The specific epithet (teretifolia) means "terete-leaved".

== Distribution and habitat ==
Round leaf grevillea grows in a range of habitats from dense heath to open shrubland and is widespread in the area between Mullewa, Albany, Peak Charles and Coolgardie in the Avon Wheatbelt, Coolgardie, Esperance Plains, Geraldton Sandplains, Jarrah Forest, Mallee and Yalgoo bioregions of south-western Western Australia.

== Conservation status ==
Grevillea teretifolia is listed as "not threatened" by the Government of Western Australia Department of Biodiversity, Conservation and Attractions.

== Use in horticulture ==
This grevillea can be grown as hedge or screening plant and attracts birds such as honeyeaters. It is suitable for gardens in colder climates and is regarded as being both drought and frost tolerant.

== See also ==
- List of Grevillea species
