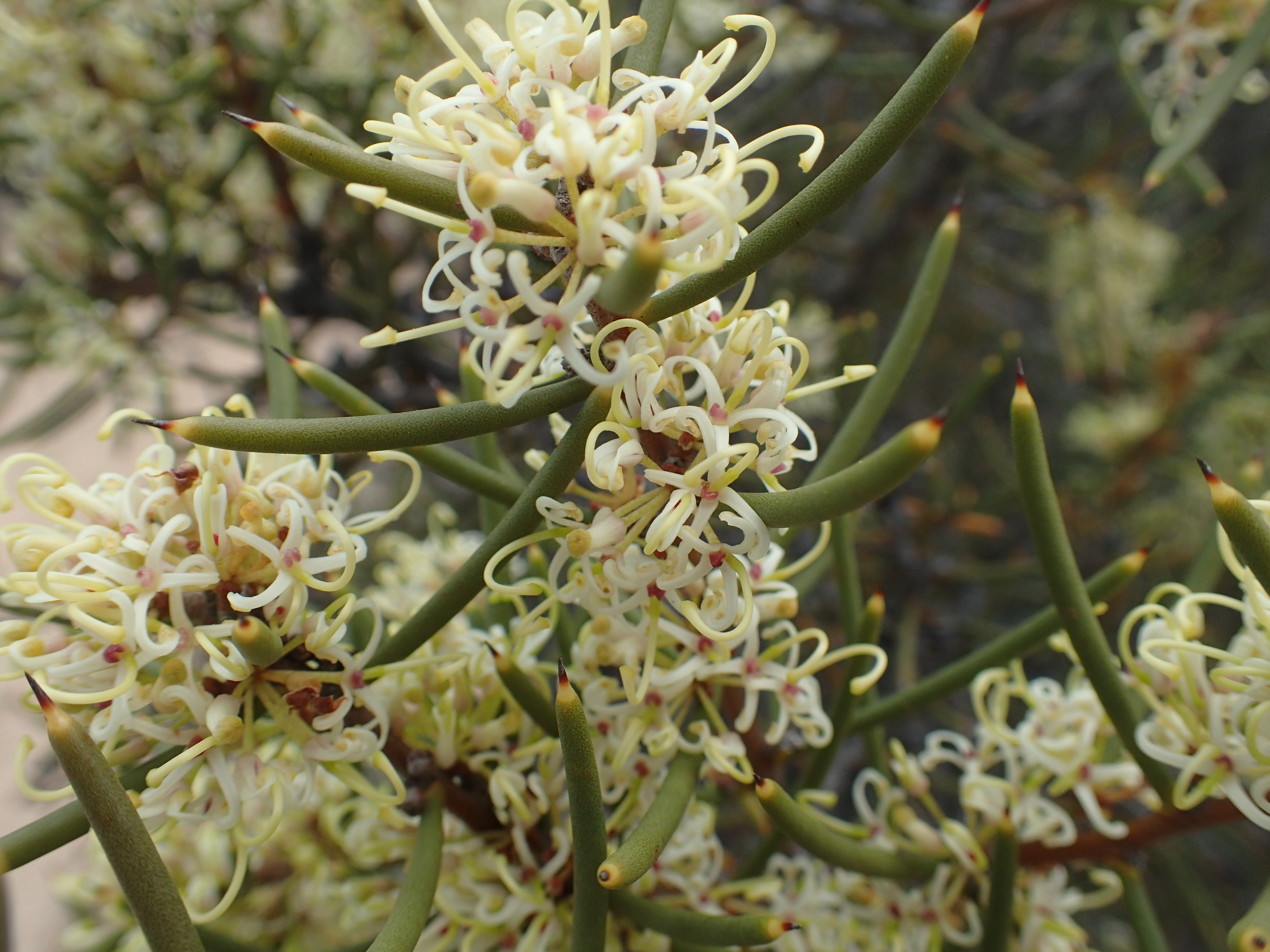
- Hakea preissii growing on the edge of Lake Hurlstone near Hyden

Scientific classification
- Kingdom: Plantae
- Clade: Tracheophytes
- Clade: Angiosperms
- Clade: Eudicots
- Order: Proteales
- Family: Proteaceae
- Genus: Hakea
- Species: H. preissii

Binomial name
- Hakea preissii Meisn.
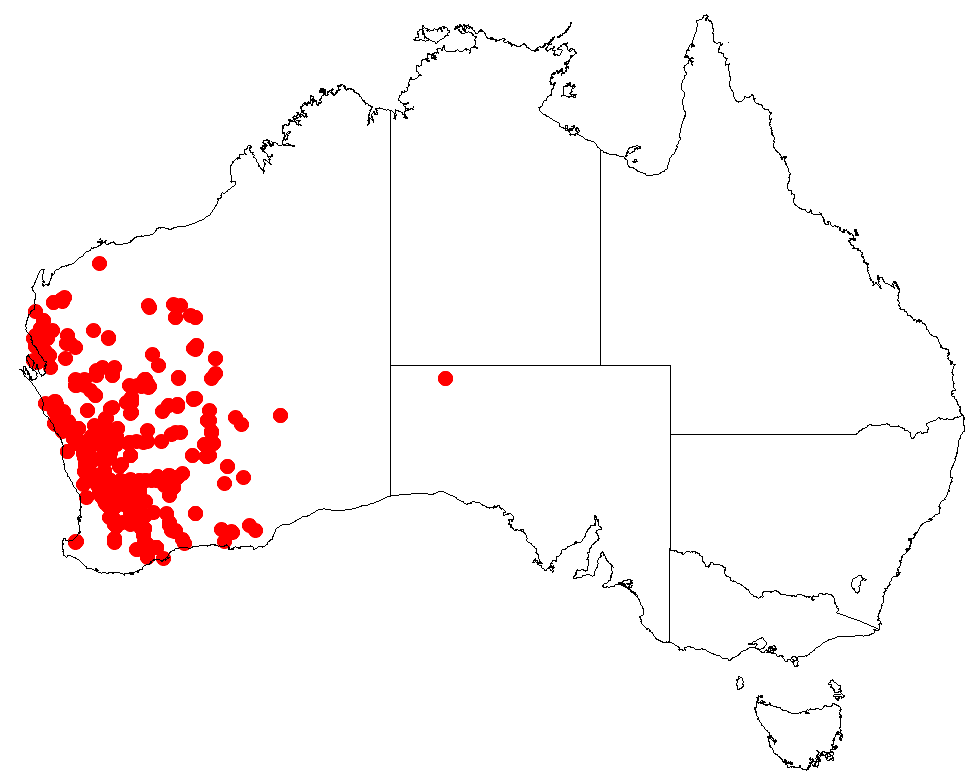
- Occurrence data from Australasian Virtual Herbarium

= Hakea preissii =

Needle bush

Species of plant native to Western Australia

Hakea preissii, commonly known as the needle tree, needle bush and Christmas hakea, is a shrub or tree of the genus Hakea native to Western Australia. The Noongar name for the plant is Tanjinn.

== Description ==
Hakea preissii is a shrub or tree which typically grows to a height of 2 to 4 metres (6.6 to 13.1 ft). It has branchlets that are moderately to densely appressed-pubescent on new growth, quickly glabrescent, and glaucous in their second year. The rigid, simple leaves are rarely divided apically into 2 or 3 segments, 1 to 6 centimetres (0.4 to 2.4 in) in length and 1.5 to 2.5 millimetres (0.06 to 0.10 in) in width. Inflorescence are axillary with 4–28 yellow-green flowers with persistent pedicels 3.5 to 7 millimetres (0.14 to 0.28 in) long. Smooth grey to black fruit that are obliquely ovate or elliptic, dilated apically and approximately 2 centimetres (0.8 in) long and 1 centimetre (0.4 in) wide. It blooms from August to December.

== Taxonomy ==
Hakea preissii was first formally described by the botanist Carl Meissner in 1845 from a specimen collected in a forest near York. The description was published in Johann Georg Christian Lehmann's work Plantae Preissianae. The specific epithet (preissii) honours Ludwig Preiss who collected plant specimens in Western Australia between 1838 and 1842.

== Distribution and habitat ==
Needle tree is endemic to an area in the Pilbara, Wheatbelt, Mid West and Goldfields–Esperance regions of Western Australia. It has a scattered distribution and is found as far north as Tom Price and south as Gnowangerup. It is found along the west coast and a little farther east than Kalgoorlie. The plant is found on plains and around the margins of salt marshes growing in sand, loam and sandy-clay soils. It sometimes invades semi-arid pastoral land in Western Australia.

== Conservation ==
This species is classified as "not threatened" by the Western Australian Government Department of Parks and Wildlife.

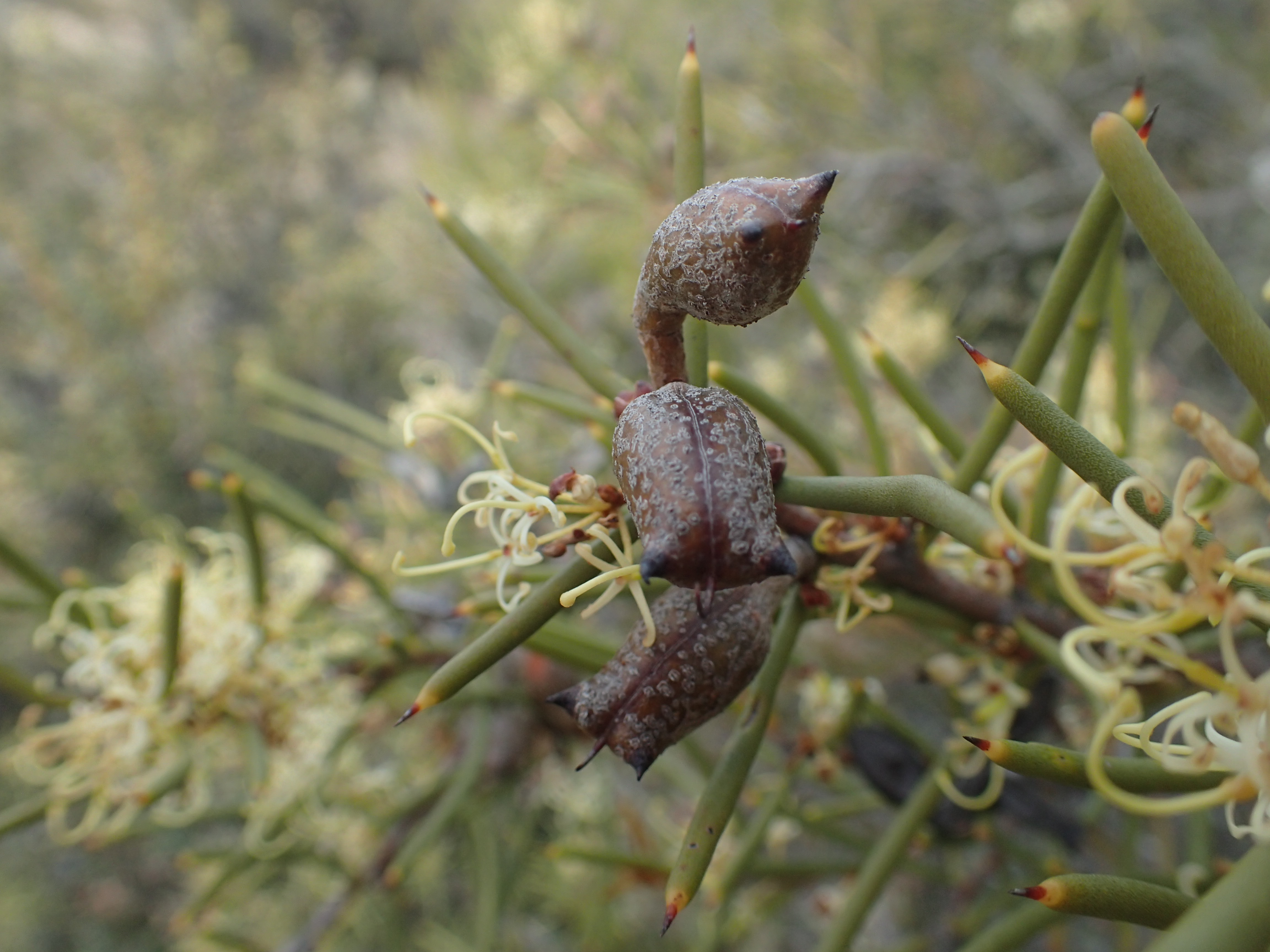
Hakea preissii fruit

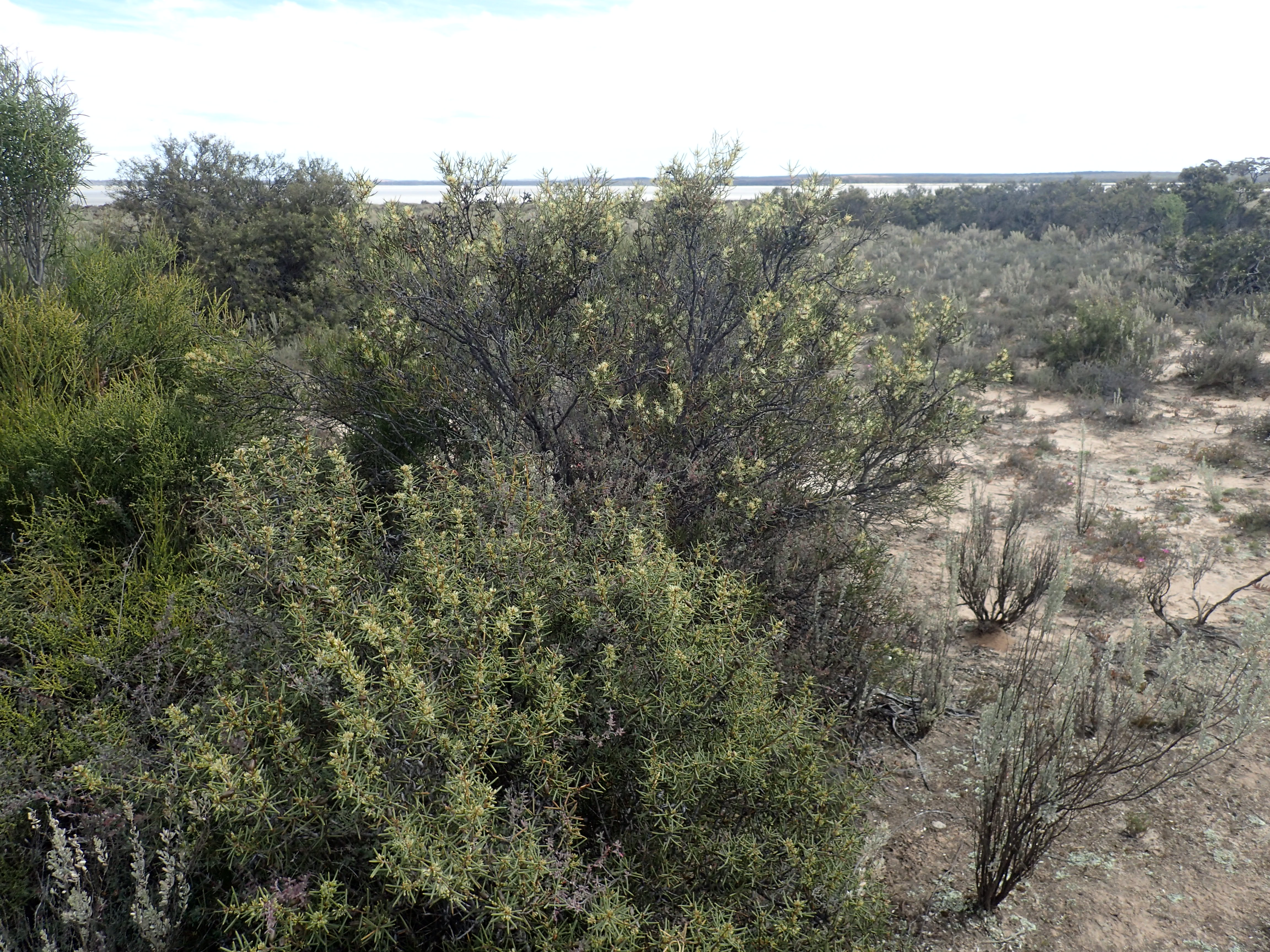
Hakea preissii habit
