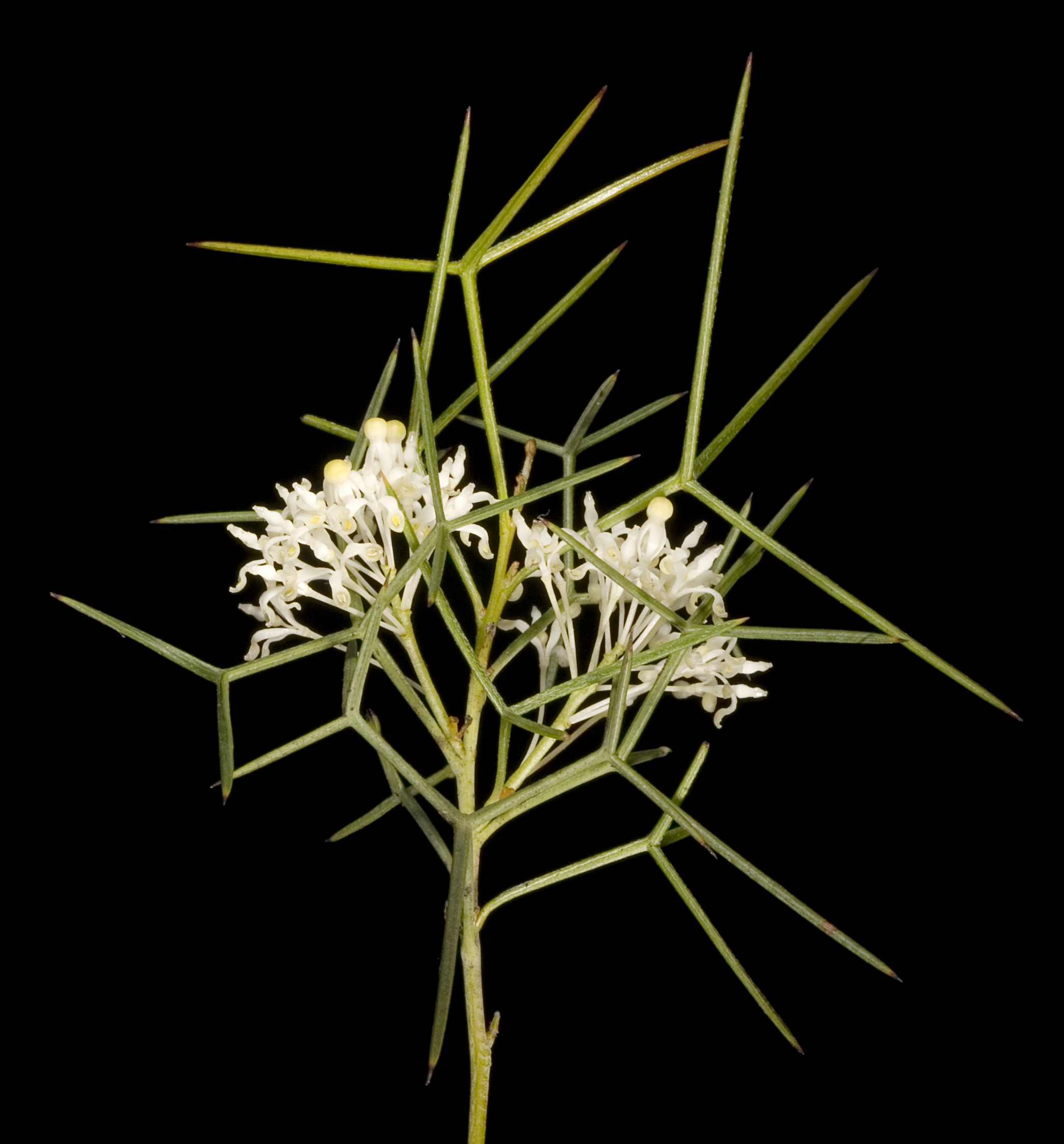

Scientific classification
- Kingdom: Plantae
- Clade: Tracheophytes
- Clade: Angiosperms
- Clade: Eudicots
- Order: Proteales
- Family: Proteaceae
- Genus: Grevillea
- Species: G. paniculata

Binomial name
- Grevillea paniculata Meisn.

= Grevillea paniculata =

Species of shrub endemic to Western Australia

Grevillea paniculata, commonly known as kerosene bush, is a species of flowering plant in the family Proteaceae and is endemic to the south-west of Western Australia. It is a dense shrub with divided leaves, the lobes linear, and more or less spherical clusters of white to cream-coloured flowers.

== Description ==
Grevillea paniculata is a dense, often prickly shrub that typically grows to a height of 0.6–3 m (2 ft 0 in – 9 ft 10 in) and sometimes has silky-hairy branchlets. The leaves are 25–60 mm (0.98–2.36 in) long and divided, with three to five lobes that are sometimes divided again, the end lobes 20–40 mm (0.79–1.57 in) long and 0.5–0.8 mm (0.020–0.031 in) wide. The edges of the leaves are rolled under, obscuring the lower surface except for the prominent mid-veins. The flowers are arranged in more or less spherical clusters and are white to cream-coloured and glabrous, the pistil 3–4 mm (0.12–0.16 in) long. Flowering occurs from May to October and the fruit is an oblong follicle 8–9 mm (0.31–0.35 in) long.

== Taxonomy ==
Grevillea paniculata was first formally described in 1845 by Carl Meissner in Johann Georg Christian Lehmann's Plantae Preissianae based on plant material collected by Ludwig Preiss near York in 1840. The specific epithet (paniculata) means "paniculate".

== Distribution and habitat ==
This grevillea grows in shrubland or heath on sandplains, near granite outcrops and on hills between Mundaring, Hyden, Merredin Pithara and Bonnie Rock in the Avon Wheatbelt, Coolgardie, Geraldton Sandplains, Jarrah Forest, Mallee and Yalgoo bioregions of south-western Western Australia.

== Conservation status ==
Grevillea paniculata is listed as "not threatened" by the Government of Western Australia Department of Biodiversity, Conservation and Attractions.
