= Leioproctus pachygenatus =

Scientific classification
- Kingdom: Animalia
- Phylum: Arthropoda
- Clade: Pancrustacea
- Class: Insecta
- Order: Hymenoptera
- Family: Colletidae
- Genus: Leioproctus
- Species: L. pachygenatus

Binomial name
- Leioproctus pachygenatus Batley, 2025

Species of bee

Leioproctus pachygenatus, or Leioproctus (Euryglossidia) pachygenatus, is a species of bee in the family Colletidae and subfamily Colletinae. It is endemic to Australia. It was described by entomologist Michael Batley in 2025.

== Etymology ==
The specific epithet pachygenatus (Latin: "thick-cheeked") is an anatomical reference.

== Description ==
The female body length is 6.5 mm, the male 6 mm. Integumental colouration is mainly black, with a black to dark brown metasoma. The hair is mostly white.

== Distribution and habitat ==
The species occurs in south-west Western Australia. The type locality is 53 km east of Hyden in the eastern Wheatbelt.

== Behaviour ==
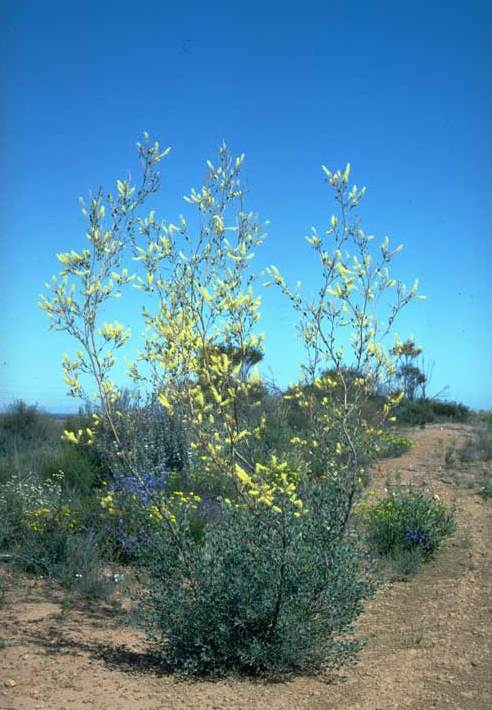
Grevillea integrifolia (entire-leaved grevillea), a forage plant of the bees

The adults are flying mellivores. Flowering plants visited by the bees include Grevillea didymobotrya, Grevillea eryngioides, Grevillea excelsior, Grevillea hookeriana, Grevillea integrifolia, Grevillea paradoxa, Grevillea pterosperma, Hakea preissii and Hakea subsulcata, as well as Stylidium species.

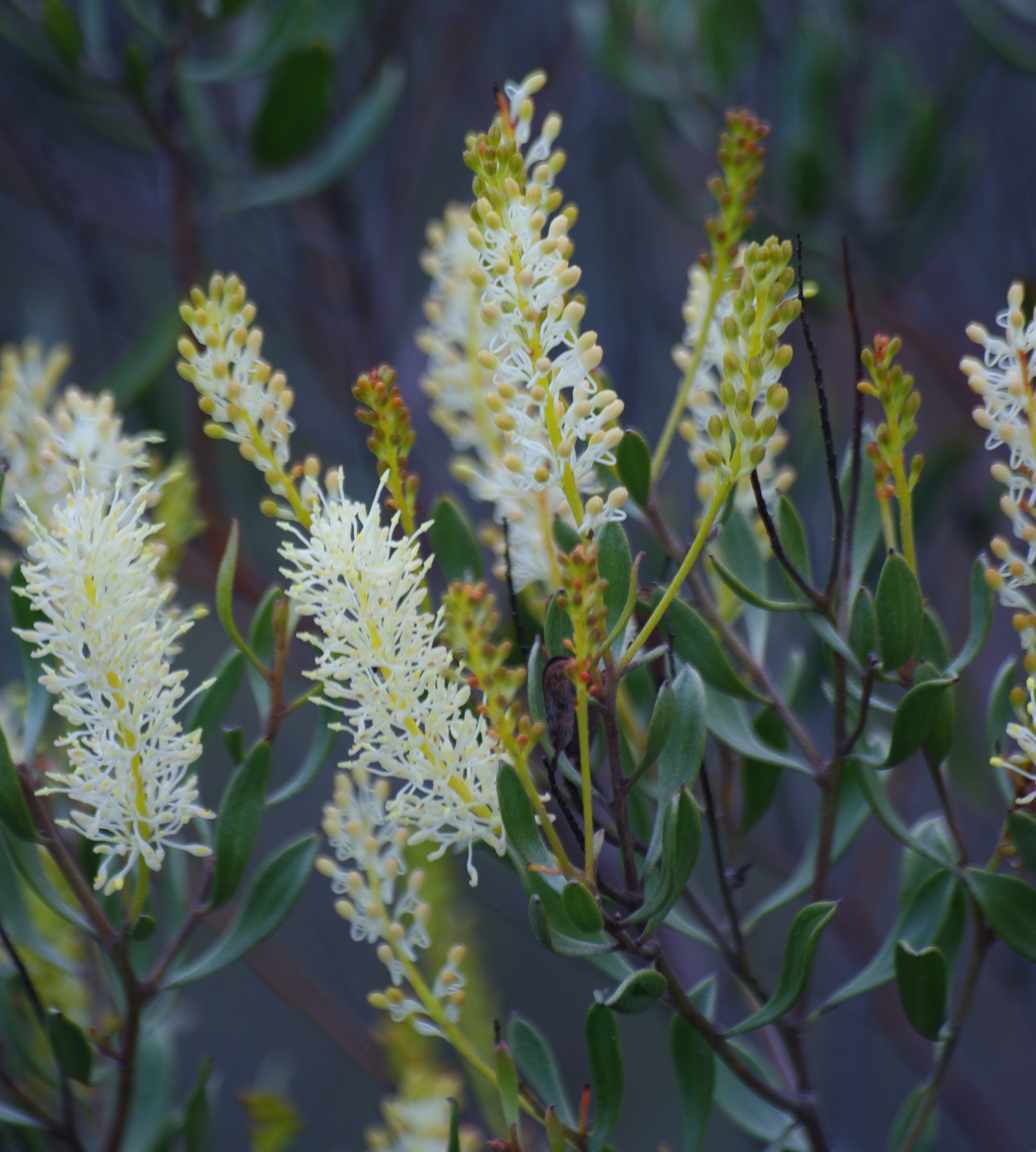
Flowers of Grevillea integrifolia
