= Calothamnus accedens =

Conservation status
- Priority Four — Rare Taxa (DEC)

Scientific classification
- Kingdom: Plantae
- Clade: Tracheophytes
- Clade: Angiosperms
- Clade: Eudicots
- Clade: Rosids
- Order: Myrtales
- Family: Myrtaceae
- Genus: Calothamnus
- Species: C. accedens

Binomial name
- Calothamnus accedens Hawkeswood

Synonyms
- Melaleuca accedens (Hawkeswood) Craven & R.D.Edwards

Species of flowering plant

Calothamnus accedens, commonly known as Piawaning clawflower, is a plant in the myrtle family, Myrtaceae and is endemic to the south-west of Western Australia. It was first formally described in 1984, declared extinct in 1992, rediscovered in 2004, removed from the "extinct" list in 2013 and found to have a population of at least 25,000 in 2015. It is a small erect shrub with crowded hairy leaves and red flowers. In 2014 Craven, Edwards and Cowley proposed that the species be renamed Melaleuca accedens.

== Description ==
Calothamnus accedens grows to a height of about 1.8 metres (6 ft) and has a single trunk, sometimes with papery bark, but is densely branched. Its leaves are crowded at the ends of the branches, stiff and needle-like, mostly 10–15 millimetres (0.4–0.6 in) long and 0.8–1.0 millimetre (0.03–0.04 in) wide. They are covered with long, whitish hairs at first but become glabrous with age and have distinct oil glands.

The flowers are a shade of dark pink to crimson and arranged in clusters of 4 to 10, mostly on one side of the stem. The petals are 6.5–8 millimetres (0.3–0.3 in) long with a prominent vein in the centre. The stamens are arranged in claw-like bundles with 15 to 21 stamens per bundle. Flowering occurs in February and is followed by fruits which are woody, cup-shaped or cylindrical capsules, 5–6 millimetres (0.20–0.24 in) long and 6.2–9 millimetres (0.2–0.4 in) in diameter.

== Taxonomy and naming ==
Calothamnus accedens was first formally described in 1984 by Trevor J. Hawkeswood from a specimen found on a roadside between Piawaning and Wongan Hills. The population in that area was apparently destroyed during roadwork in the 1980s and the species declared extinct in 1992. In 2004 a specimen was collected in a botanical survey, then other populations were located so that by 2007, the population size was estimated at more than 25,000 and the species was removed from the endangered list. The specific epithet (accedens) is derived from "Latin, meaning approximating or resembling." The name refers to this species' close relationship to C. brevifolius and C. hirsutus.

== Distribution and habitat ==
Calothamnus accedens occurs in the area between Perth and 420 kilometres (300 mi) to the north of Perth in the Avon Wheatbelt, Geraldton Sandplains, Jarrah Forest and Swan Coastal Plain biogeographic regions. It grows in sandy soils over laterite.

== Conservation ==
This species was removed from the extinct list on 6 March 2013 and is recommended for removal from all lists under the Australian Government Environment Protection and Biodiversity Conservation Act 1999. Although some populations are in areas outside protected zones, it is estimated that at least 20,000 individual plants are in a national park. It is classified as "Priority Four" by the Western Australian Government Department of Parks and Wildlife meaning that is rare or near threatened.
