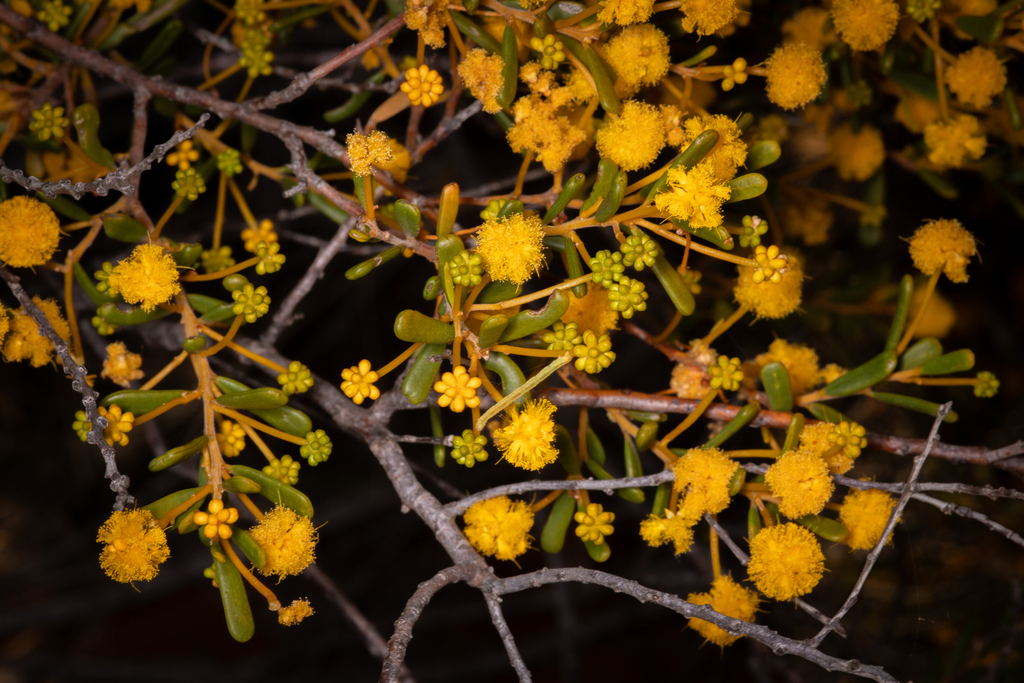
- On North West Cape, near Exmouth

Scientific classification
- Kingdom: Plantae
- Clade: Embryophytes
- Clade: Tracheophytes
- Clade: Spermatophytes
- Clade: Angiosperms
- Clade: Eudicots
- Clade: Rosids
- Order: Fabales
- Family: Fabaceae
- Subfamily: Caesalpinioideae
- Clade: Mimosoid clade
- Genus: Acacia
- Species: A. spathulifolia

Binomial name
- Acacia spathulifolia Maslin
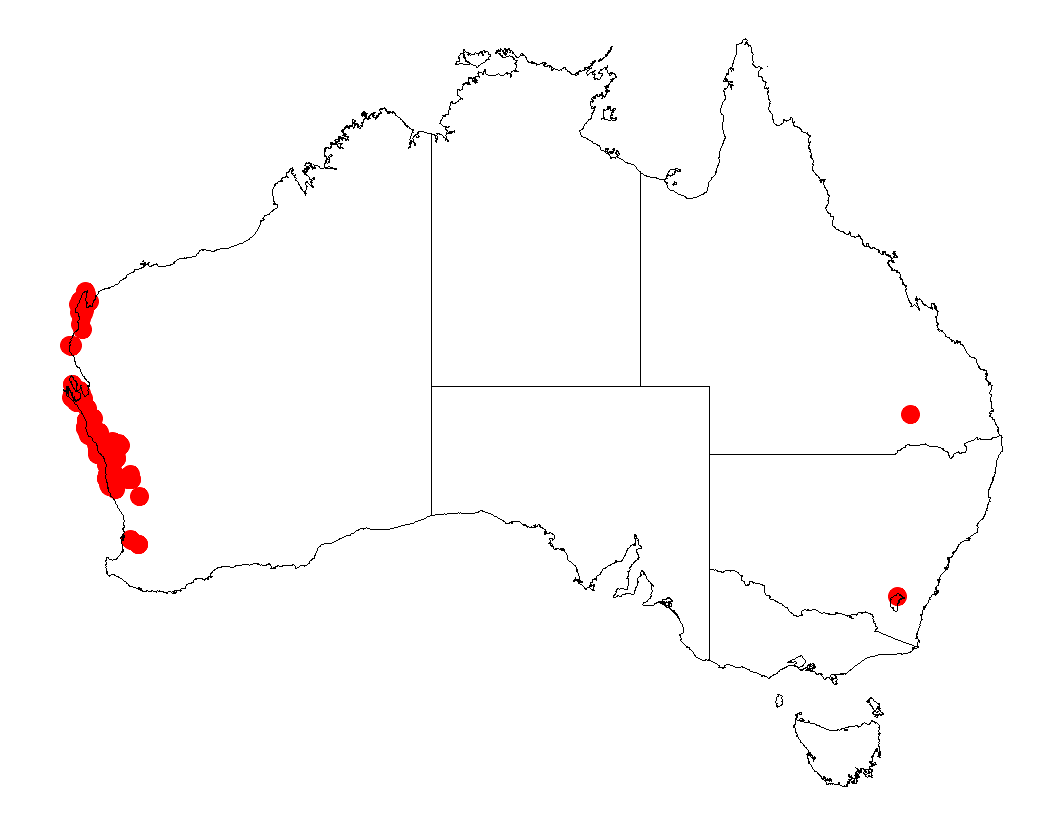
- Occurrence data from AVH

= Acacia spathulifolia =

Species of legume

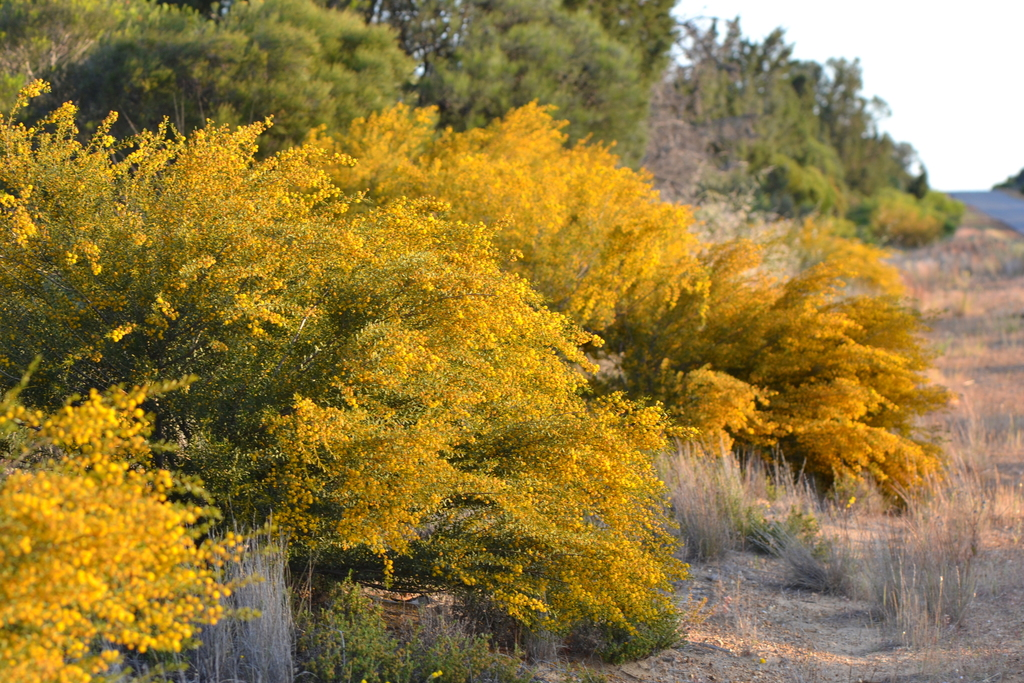
Near Marchagee

Acacia spathulifolia commonly known as Gold carpet or the Gold carpet wattle is a shrub of the genus Acacia and the subgenus Phyllodineae that is endemic to coastal parts of western Australia.

== Description ==
The dense spreading shrub typically grows to a height of 0.5 to 3.0 metres (1.6 to 9.8 ft). It has glabrous or puberulous branchlets. Like most species of Acacia it has phyllodes rather than true leaves. The thick and fleshy evergreen and horizontally flattened phyllodes have a narrowly oblong-oblanceolate shape with a length of 1 to 2 cm (0.39 to 0.79 in) and a width of 1.5 to 4.5 mm (0.059 to 0.177 in). The glabrous phyllodes are longitudinally wrinkled and a green to yellow-green colour with distinct yellow coloured marginal nerves. It blooms profusely from June to October and produces yellow flowers. It produces inflorescences the occur mostlysingly and have spherical flower-heads with a diameter of 5 to 6 mm (0.20 to 0.24 in) that are sub-densely packed with 9 to 15 golden coloured flowers. Following flowering crustaceous to coriaceous brown coloured seed pods for that have a narrowly oblong shape. The glabrous pods have a length of up to 4 cm (1.6 in) and a width of 4 to 4.5 mm (0.16 to 0.18 in) and have fine longitudinal divisions. The shiny dark brown seeds have an oblong to elliptic shape with a length of up to 4 mm (0.16 in) and have a white coloured aril.

== Taxonomy ==
The species was first formally described by the botanist Bruce Maslin in 1978 as part of the work Studies in the genus Acacia - The taxonomy of some diaphyllodinous species s published in the journal Nuytsia. It was reclassified as Racosperma spathulifolium by Leslie Pedley in 2003 then transferred back to genus Acacia in 2006.

== Distribution ==
It is native to an area in the Mid West, Wheatbelt and Gascoyne regions of Western Australia where it is commonly situated on sandplains and around areas of coastal limestone growing in sandy soils. The range of the plant extends from around Cape Range National Park in the north south along the coast through Kalbarri and Jurien where it is far more common. It is found as far as Mullewa and Piawaning in the east and is usually a part of coastal heath, low woodland and shrubland communities.

== Cultivation ==
The spoon shaped foliage and golden flowers make the plant an ideal feature groundcover.

== See also ==
- List of Acacia species
