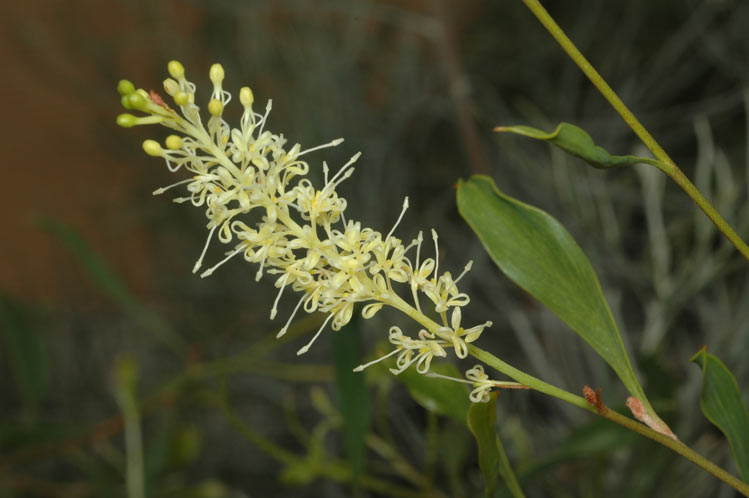
- Subspecies canarina in the Australian National Botanic Gardens

Scientific classification
- Kingdom: Plantae
- Clade: Tracheophytes
- Clade: Angiosperms
- Clade: Eudicots
- Order: Proteales
- Family: Proteaceae
- Genus: Grevillea
- Species: G. shuttleworthiana

Binomial name
- Grevillea shuttleworthiana Meisn.

= Grevillea shuttleworthiana =

Species of shrub endemic to Western Australia

Grevillea shuttleworthiana is a species of flowering plant in the family Proteaceae and is endemic to the south-west of Western Australia. It is a more or less erect shrub with variably-shaped leaves, the shape depending on subspecies, and cylindrical clusters of cream-coloured to yellow or greenish flowers, often held above the foliage.

== Description ==
Grevillea shuttleworthiana is a more or less erect shrub that typically grows to a height of 0.5 to 3 metres (1.6 to 9.8 ft) and has silky-hairy to glabrous branchlets. Its leaves are egg-shaped to elliptic, heart-shaped, spatula-shaped or more or less round, depending on subspecies, 5–50 mm (0.20–1.97 in) long and 5–30 mm (0.20–1.18 in) wide. The two surfaces are similar to each other, except that the veins are usually prominent on the lower surface, sometimes glaucous, sometimes slightly hairy. The flowers are arranged in cylindrical clusters mostly 30–45 mm (1.2–1.8 in) long, often held high above the foliage. The flowers are pale yellow, those at the base of the clusters flowering first, the pistil 4.5–6.5 mm (0.18–0.26 in) long. Flowering occurs from July to December, and the fruit is an oval to pyramid-shaped, smooth to rough follicle 7–17 mm (0.28–0.67 in) long.

This grevillea is similar to Grevillea integrifolia but has ridged branchlets.

== Taxonomy ==
Grevillea shuttleworthiana was first formally described in 1848 by Carl Meissner in Lehmann's Plantae Preissianae from specimens collected by James Drummond in the Swan River Colony. The specific epithet (shuttleworthiana) honours Robert James Shuttleworth.

In 1994, Peter M. Olde and Neil R. Marriott described three subspecies of G. shuttleworthiana in The Grevillea Book, and the names are accepted by the Australian Plant Census:

- Grevillea shuttleworthiana subsp. canarina Olde & Marriott has yellowish-green, egg-shaped, more or less glabrous leaves with the narrower end towards the base, 25–60 mm (0.98–2.36 in) long, and the flowers in clusters 45–75 mm (1.8–3.0 in) long from August to October.
- Grevillea shuttleworthiana subsp. obovata Benth. Olde & Marriott (previously known as G. integrifolia var. obovata Benth.) has bluish-green to grey, more or less round to narrowly egg-shaped or spatula-shaped, sparsely hairy leaves, 5–30 mm (0.20–1.18 in) long, and the flowers in clusters 20–35 mm (0.79–1.38 in) long from July to December.
- Grevillea shuttleworthiana Meisn. subsp. shuttleworthiana usually has bluish-green, more or less round to egg-shaped glabrous leaves, 10–45 mm (0.39–1.77 in) long, and the flowers in clusters 20–45 mm (0.79–1.77 in) long from July to September.

== Distribution ==
Grevillea shuttleworthiana grows on sandy soil, loam, gravel or laterite in low heath from Kalbarri in the north to as far south as Ravensthorpe.

Subspecies carinata is found between Binnu, Mullering Brook (in Badgingarra National Park) and Piawaning in the Avon Wheatbelt, Geraldton Sandplains, Jarrah Forest, Mallee and Swan Coastal Plain bioregions,

Subspecies obovata occurs between Mount Jackson, Bronti (near Yellowdine), the Ravensthorpe Range and Lake Grace in the Avon Wheatbelt, Coolgardie, Esperance Plains and Mallee bioregions.

Subspecies shuttleworthiana grows between Perenjori and Bonnie Rock, south to Yorkrakine in the Avon Wheatbelt, Geraldton Sandplains and Mallee bioregions of south-western Western Australia.

== Conservation status ==
All three subspecies of G. shuttleworthiana are listed as "not threatened" by the Western Australian Government Department of Biodiversity, Conservation and Attractions.

== See also ==
- List of Grevillea species
