= Jacksonia pungens =

Conservation status
- Endangered (EPBC Act)

Scientific classification
- Kingdom: Plantae
- Clade: Tracheophytes
- Clade: Angiosperms
- Clade: Eudicots
- Clade: Rosids
- Order: Fabales
- Family: Fabaceae
- Subfamily: Faboideae
- Genus: Jacksonia
- Species: J. pungens

Binomial name
- Jacksonia pungens Chappill

Species of legume

Jacksonia pungens is a species of flowering plant in the family Fabaceae and is endemic to the south-west of Western Australia. It is an erect, rounded, domed shrub with greyish-green branches, scattered, sharply-pointed end branches, leaves reduced to dark brown, egg-shaped scales, orange-red flowers with red markings, and woody, densely hairy, elliptic pods.

== Description ==
Jacksonia pungens is an erect, rounded, domed shrub that typically grows up to 0.3–1 m (1 ft 0 in – 3 ft 3 in) high and 0.4–1 m (1 ft 4 in – 3 ft 3 in) wide. It has greyish-green branches, scattered, sharply-pointed branchlets mostly 8–73 mm (0.31–2.87 in) long and 1.5–2 mm (0.059–0.079 in) wide, its leaves reduced to egg-shaped, dark brown scales, 1.3–3.7 mm (0.051–0.146 in) long and 0.7–1.6 mm (0.028–0.063 in) wide. The flowers are scattered on the branchlets on a pedicel 1.5–5.5 mm (0.059–0.217 in) long, with egg-shaped bracteoles 5.7–9.3 mm (0.22–0.37 in) long and 2.1–5 mm (0.083–0.197 in) wide. The floral tube is 0.8–1.4 mm (0.031–0.055 in) long and the sepals are papery, with lobes 10.3–13.7 mm (0.41–0.54 in) long, 2–6 mm (0.079–0.236 in) wide and fused for 1.2–1.5 mm (0.047–0.059 in). The standard petal is orange-red with red markings, 7.7–10.2 mm (0.30–0.40 in) long and 7.8–11.2 mm (0.31–0.44 in) deep, the wings orange-red with red markings 8.1–9.2 mm (0.32–0.36 in) long, and the keel is red, 7.3–8.1 mm (0.29–0.32 in) long. The stamens have white filaments with a pink tip, 5.7–10.3 mm (0.22–0.41 in) long. Flowering occurs in October and November, and the fruit is an elliptic, woody, densely hairy pod 6.7–7.1 mm (0.26–0.28 in) long and 4.8–5.4 mm (0.19–0.21 in) wide.

== Taxonomy ==
Jacksonia pungens was first formally described in 2007 by Jennifer Anne Chappill in Australian Systematic Botany from specimens collected by Chappill, Carolyn F. Wilkins and Kelly Anne Shepherd south of Marchagee in 1993. The specific epithet (pungens) means 'ending in a sharp, hard point', referring to the long, pungent branchlets.

== Distribution and habitat ==
This species of Jacksonia grows in tall shrubland on sandy soil or laterite and is only known from remnant populations south of Marchagee in the Avon Wheatbelt and Geraldton Sandplains bioregions of south-western Western Australia.

== Conservation status ==
Jacksonia pungens is listed as "endangered" under the Australian Government Environment Protection and Biodiversity Conservation Act 1999 and as "Threatened Flora (Declared Rare Flora — Extant)" by the Government of Western Australia Department of Biodiversity, Conservation and Attractions. The main threats to the species are road and rail maintenance, damage caused by vehicles and farming activities.
