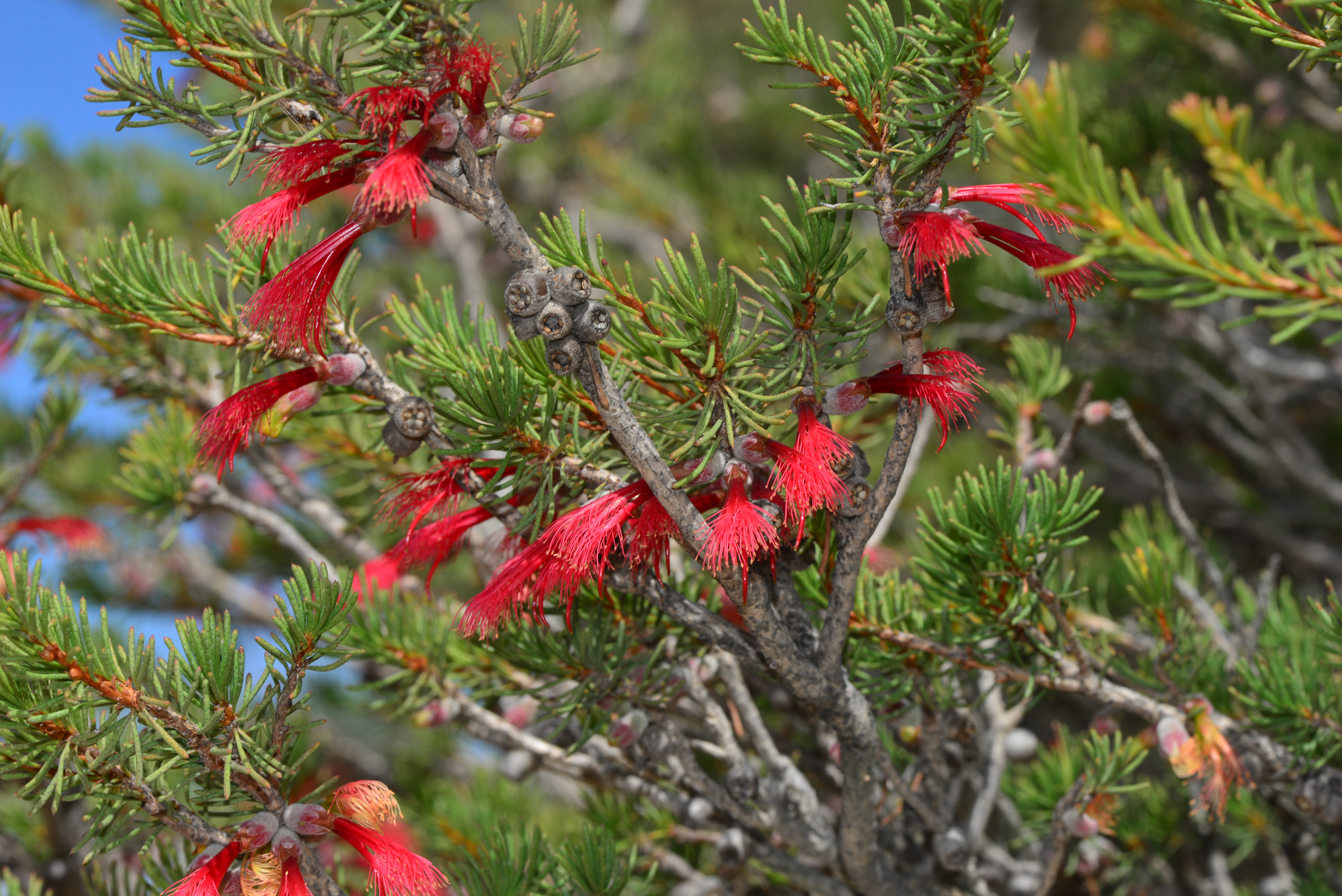
- In the Charles Gardner Nature Reserve

Conservation status
- Priority Four — Rare Taxa (DEC)

Scientific classification
- Kingdom: Plantae
- Clade: Tracheophytes
- Clade: Angiosperms
- Clade: Eudicots
- Clade: Rosids
- Order: Myrtales
- Family: Myrtaceae
- Genus: Calothamnus
- Species: C. brevifolius

Binomial name
- Calothamnus brevifolius Hawkeswood

Synonyms
- Calothamnus villosus var. ericifolius Benth. Melaleuca hawkeswoodii Craven & R.D.Edwards

= Calothamnus brevifolius =

Species of flowering plant

Calothamnus brevifolius is a plant in the myrtle family, Myrtaceae and is endemic to the south-west of Western Australia. It is a small, highly branched shrub with almost cylindrical, pointed leaves and red flowers in summer. In 2014 Craven, Edwards and Cowley proposed that the species be renamed Melaleuca hawkeswoodii.

== Description ==
Calothamnus brevifolius is a small, spreading, densely branched, glabrous shrub growing to a height of about 0.5 metres (2 ft) with thick bark on the older stems. Its leaves are mostly crowded on the younger branches, 7–15 millimetres (0.3–0.6 in) long, 0.5–0.8 millimetres (0.02–0.03 in) wide, linear, almost circular in cross section and tapering to a sharp but not prickly point.

The flowers are dark pink and arranged in short dense clusters of 1 to 5 around the stem, usually on the younger branches. The petals are papery and 5–6 millimetres (0.2–0.2 in) long. The stamens are arranged in claw-like bundles with 15 to 20 stamens per bundle. Flowering occurs in January and February and is followed by fruits which are woody, roughly cylindrical capsules, 1.5–2 millimetres (0.06–0.08 in) wide.

== Taxonomy and naming ==
Calothamnus brevifolius was first formally described in 1984 by Trevor Hawkeswood from a specimen found on a roadside 11 kilometres (7 mi) east of Piawaning. The specific epithet (brevifolius) is said to be derived from the Latin brevi meaning "short" and folius meaning "leaved", and refers to the characteristically short leaves of this species. In classical Latin the proper word for "short" is brevis (masculine and feminine) or breve (neuter). Folius is not attested as a single word in classical Latin, and can only be found as part of a compound in classical and botanical Latin.

== Distribution and habitat ==
Calothamnus brevifolius is only known from the Piawaning, Cunderdin, Corrigin and Marchagee districts in the Avon Wheatbelt, Geraldton Sandplains and Mallee biogeographic regions. It usually grows in sand or loamy soil in association with Xylomelum angustifolium, Banksia prionotes, Melaleuca acuminata or Thryptomene prolifera.

== Conservation ==
Calothamnus brevifolius is listed as "Priority 4" by the Western Australian government Department of Parks and Wildlife meaning that it is rare or near threatened.
