= Acacia ericksoniae =

Scientific classification
- Kingdom: Plantae
- Clade: Tracheophytes
- Clade: Angiosperms
- Clade: Eudicots
- Clade: Rosids
- Order: Fabales
- Family: Fabaceae
- Subfamily: Caesalpinioideae
- Clade: Mimosoid clade
- Genus: Acacia
- Species: A. ericksoniae

Binomial name
- Acacia ericksoniae Maslin
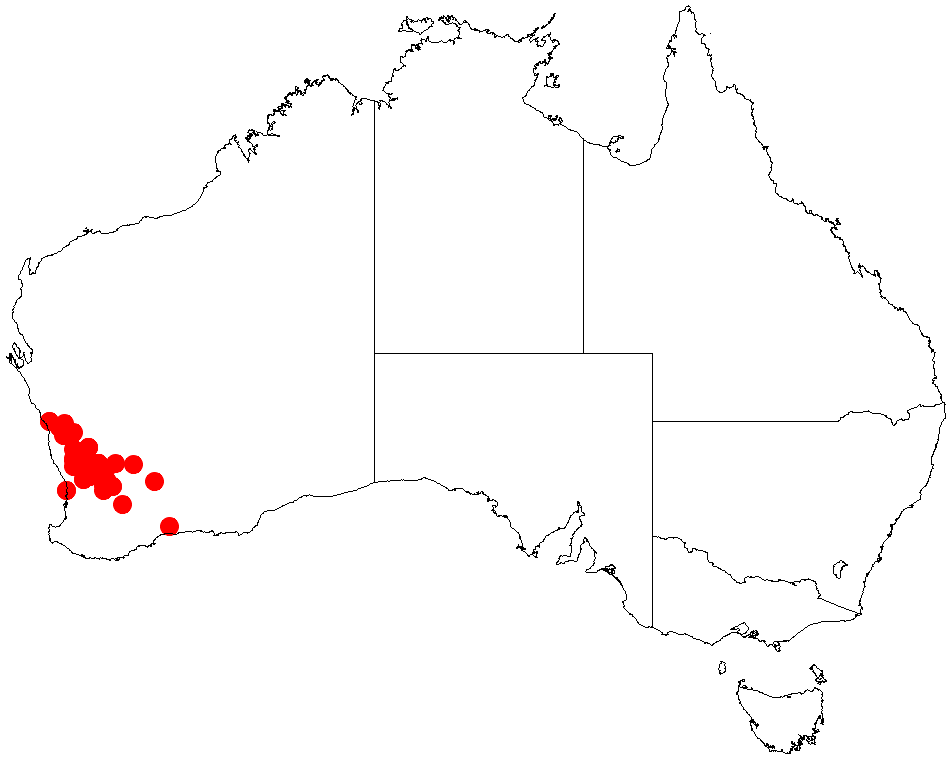
- Occurrence data from AVH

Synonyms
- Acacia ericksonii Maslin orth. var.; Racosperma ericksoniae (Maslin) Pedley; Acacia bidentata auct. non Benth.: Diels, F.L.E. & Pritzel, E.G. (6 December 1904)

Species of legume

Acacia ericksoniae is a species of flowering plant in the family Fabaceae and is endemic to the south-west of Western Australia. It is a many-branched, more or less spreading shrub with hairy branchlets that are often spiny, triangular phyllodes with the narrower end towards the base, spherical heads of golden yellow flowers, and coiled pods.

== Description ==
Acacia ericksoniae is a many-branched, more or less spreading shrub that typically grows to a height of 20–60 cm (7.9–23.6 in) and has more or less slender branchlets covered with tiny, rigid hairs and often spiny. The phyllodes are triangular with the narrower end towards the base, 2–5 mm (0.079–0.197 in) long and 1.5–4 mm (0.059–0.157 in) wide, the upper margin forming a prominent, rounded angle and the lower margin shallowly convex. The phyllodes have a short, sometimes sharp point on the ends and are covered with tiny, rigid hairs. The flowers are borne in a spherical head in axils more than 0.5 mm (0.020 in) long on a peduncle 2–5 mm (0.079–0.197 in) long, the heads 3–4 mm (0.12–0.16 in) in diameter with 10 to 17 golden yellow flowers. Flowering occurs from June to September, and the pods are closely coiled, up to 8 mm (0.31 in) long and 2.0–2.5 mm (0.079–0.098 in) wide, firmly papery to thinly leathery and red-brown. The seeds are 2–3 mm (0.079–0.118 in) long, brown mottled black, with a thick aril.

== Taxonomy ==
Acacia ericksoniae was first formally described in 1999 by Bruce Maslin in the journal Nuytsia from specimens he collected 5.5 km (3.4 mi) north of Wongan Hills towards Piawaning in 1976. The specific epithet (ericksoniae) honours "Mrs Frederika (Rca) Erickson, who has made a significant contribution to our knowledge of the Western Australian flora...".

== Distribution ==
This species of wattle grows on sandplain, scrub or woodland on low, rocky hills near Mingenew and Three Springs, from near Watheroo and south-south-east to near Tammin and in the Chiddarcooping Nature Reserve (about 100 km (62 mi) due east of Watheroo, in the Avon Wheatbelt, Geraldton Sandplains, Mallee and Swan Coastal Plain bioregions of south-western Western Australia.

== Conservation status ==
Acacia ericksoniae is listed as "not threatened" by the Government of Western Australia Department of Biodiversity, Conservation and Attractions.

== See also ==
- List of Acacia species
