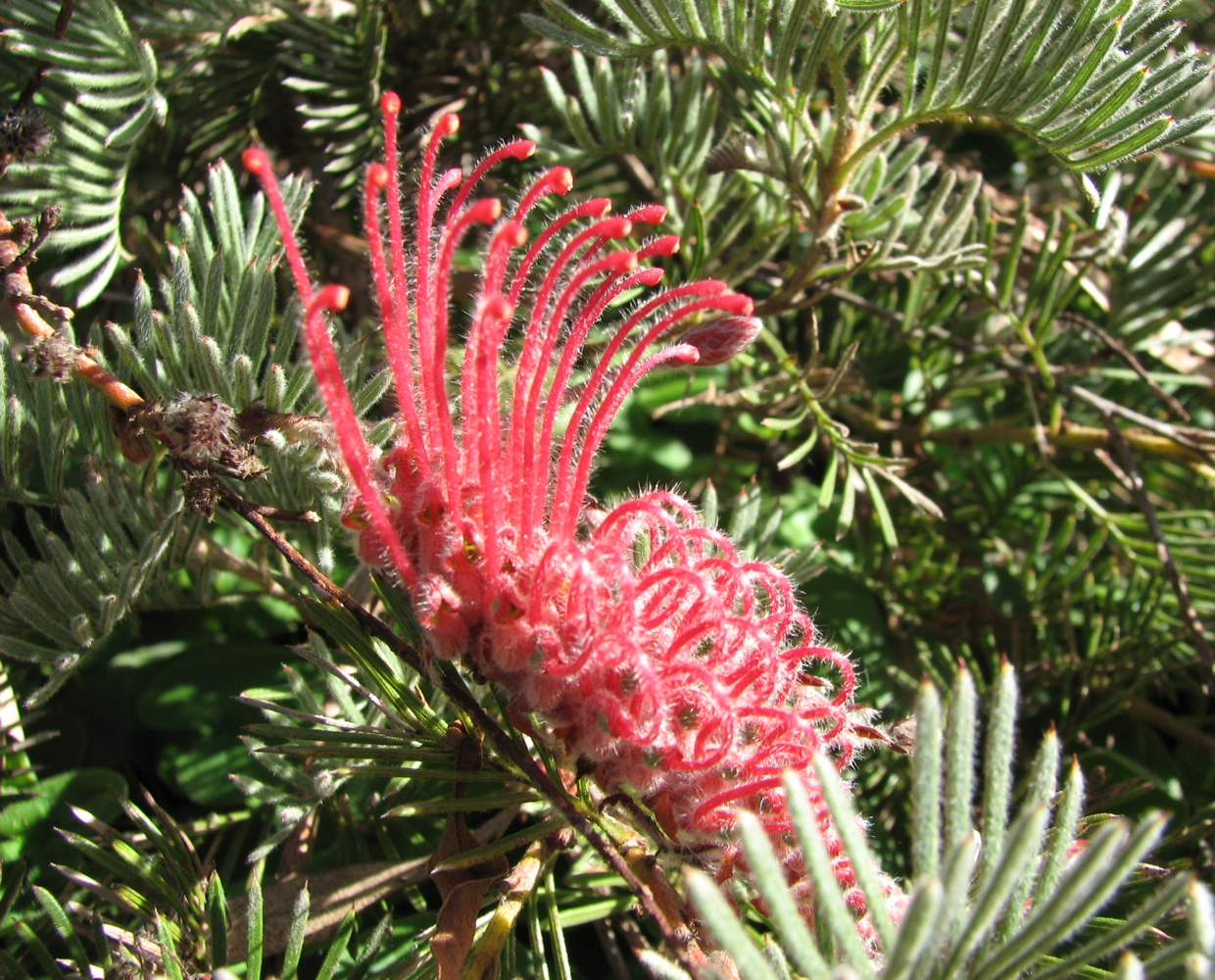

Scientific classification
- Kingdom: Plantae
- Clade: Tracheophytes
- Clade: Angiosperms
- Clade: Eudicots
- Order: Proteales
- Family: Proteaceae
- Genus: Grevillea
- Species: G. thyrsoides

Binomial name
- Grevillea thyrsoides Meisn.

= Grevillea thyrsoides =

Species of shrub endemic to Western Australia

Grevillea thyrsoides is a species of flowering plant in the family Proteaceae, and is endemic to the southwest of Western Australia. It is a small, spreading or low-lying shrub, with pinnatisect to comb-like leaves, the end lobes linear, and clusters of hairy pinkish-red flowers.

== Description ==
Grevillea thyrsoides is a spreading or low-lying shrub that typically grows to 0.3 to 0.7 cm (0.12 to 0.28 in) high and 1.5 m (4 ft 11 in) wide, sometimes forming a mound. Its leaves are 25–115 mm (0.98–4.53 in) long and pinnatisect with 15 to 30 closely space, linear lobes often arranged comb-like on either side of the leaf rachis. The lobes are 7–65 mm (0.28–2.56 in) long, 0.9–1.4 mm (0.035–0.055 in) wide, and sometimes sharply pointed. The edges of the leaflets are rolled under, enclosing the lower surface apart from the mid-vein. The flowers are borne on one side of a trailing leafless peduncle 100–600 mm (3.9–23.6 in) long, the floral rachis 25–110 mm (0.98–4.33 in) long. The flowers are hairy, dusky pink to pale red with a bright pinkish-red style, the pistil 21.5–35 mm (0.85–1.38 in) long. Flowering mainly from August to November, and the fruit is a hairy follicle 14–18 mm (0.55–0.71 in) long.

== Taxonomy ==
Grevillea thyrsoides was first formerly described in 1855 by Swiss botanist Carl Meissner in the William Jackson Hooker's Journal of Botany and Kew Garden Miscellany based on plant material collected by James Drummond "between Dundagaran and Smith River". The specific epithet (thyrsoides) means "thyrse-like".

In 1993, Peter M. Olde and Neil R. Marriott described two subspecies in the journal Nuytsia and the names are accepted by the Australian Plant Census:

- Grevillea thyrsoides subsp. pustulata Olde & Marriott has leaves mostly 25–40 mm (0.98–1.57 in) long, the lobes 9–32 mm (0.35–1.26 in) long, and the stalk of the ovary is 1–2 mm (0.039–0.079 in) long.
- Grevillea thyrsoides Meisn. subsp. thyrsoides has leaves mostly 55–115 mm (2.2–4.5 in) long, the lobes 15–65 mm (0.59–2.56 in) long, and the stalk of the ovary is 2.0–2.8 mm (0.079–0.110 in) long.

== Distribution and habitat ==
The grevillea grows in heath and Banksia mallee. Subspecies pustulata occurs in the area between Marchagee, Coorow and Watheroo in the Avon Wheatbelt and Geraldton Sandplains bioregions of south-western Western Australia and subsp. thyrsoides between Badgingarra and Dandaragan in the Geraldton Sandplains and Swan Coastal Plain bioregions.

== Conservation status ==
Both subspecies of G. thyrsoides are listed as "Priority Three" by the Government of Western Australia Department of Biodiversity, Conservation and Attractions, meaning that they are poorly known and known from only a few locations but are not under imminent threat.

== See also ==
- List of Grevillea species
