= Acacia dura =

Conservation status
- Priority Two — Poorly Known Taxa (DEC)

Scientific classification
- Kingdom: Plantae
- Clade: Tracheophytes
- Clade: Angiosperms
- Clade: Eudicots
- Clade: Rosids
- Order: Fabales
- Family: Fabaceae
- Subfamily: Caesalpinioideae
- Clade: Mimosoid clade
- Genus: Acacia
- Species: A. dura

Binomial name
- Acacia dura Benth.
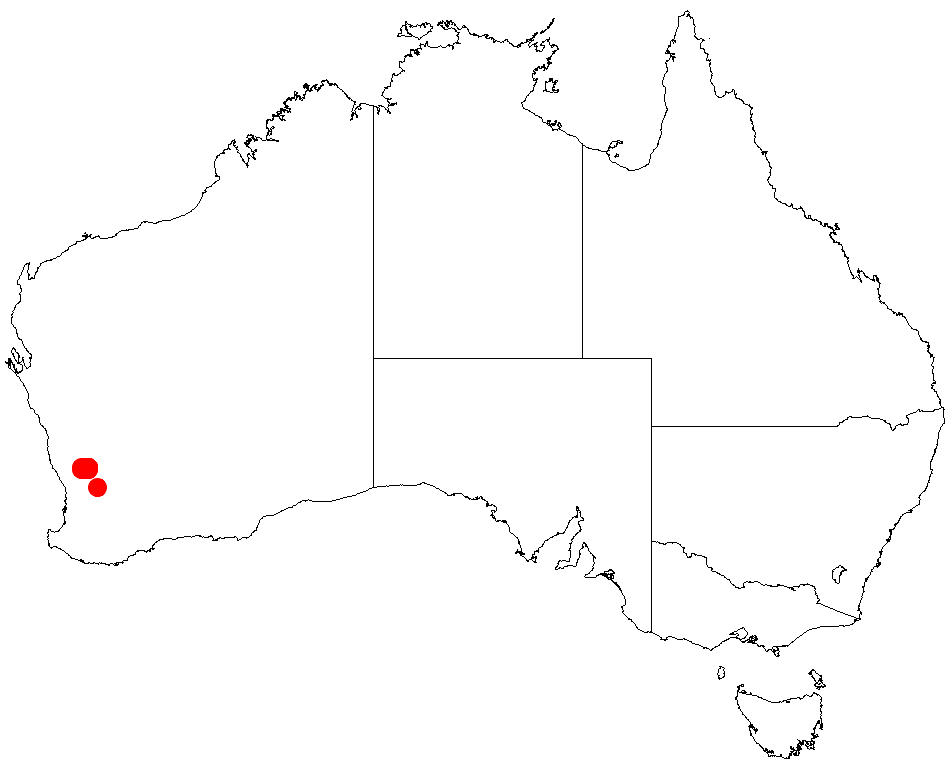
- Occurrence data from AVH

Synonyms
- Racosperma durum (Benth.) Pedley

Species of legume

Acacia dura is a species of flowering plant in the family Fabaceae and is endemic to the south-west of Western Australia. It is a densely branched shrub with erect, narrowly linear phyllodes, spherical heads of golden yellow flowers, and linear, thinly crust-like pods, more or less constricted between the seeds.

== Description ==
Acacia dura is a densely branched, glabrous shrub that typically grows to a height of 0.6–1.6 m (2 ft 0 in – 5 ft 3 in) and has ribbed branchlets. Its phyllodes are erect, narrowly linear, compressed and flat, 25–40 mm (0.98–1.57 in) long and 2–3 mm (0.079–0.118 in) wide with six raised veins and a distinct gland 8–30 mm (0.31–1.18 in) above the base of the phyllode. The flowers are borne in two spherical heads in axils on peduncles 3–8 mm (0.12–0.31 in) long. The heads are 3.5–4 mm (0.14–0.16 in) in diameter with 6 to 26 golden yellow flowers. Flowering occurs in August, and the pods are linear, straight to slightly curved, up to 22 mm (0.87 in) long and 3 mm (0.12 in) wide, thinly crust-like, glabrous and more or less constricted between the seeds. The seeds are narrowly elliptic, 2.5 mm (0.098 in) long and shiny, with a club-shaped aril extending along one side.

== Taxonomy ==
Acacia dura was first formally described in 1855 by George Bentham in the journal Linnaea from specimens collected by James Drummond. The specific epithet, (dura) means 'hard', 'unpolished' or 'vigorous', referring to the thick, rigid phyllodes.

== Distribution ==
This species of wattle is known only from the Wongan Hills-Piawaning area where it grows in sand in heath with Melaleuca uncinata in the Avon Wheatbelt bioregion of south-western Western Australia.

== Conservation status ==
Acacia dura is listed as "Priority Two" by the Government of Western Australia Department of Biodiversity, Conservation and Attractions, meaning that it is poorly known and from one or a few locations.

== See also ==
- List of Acacia species
