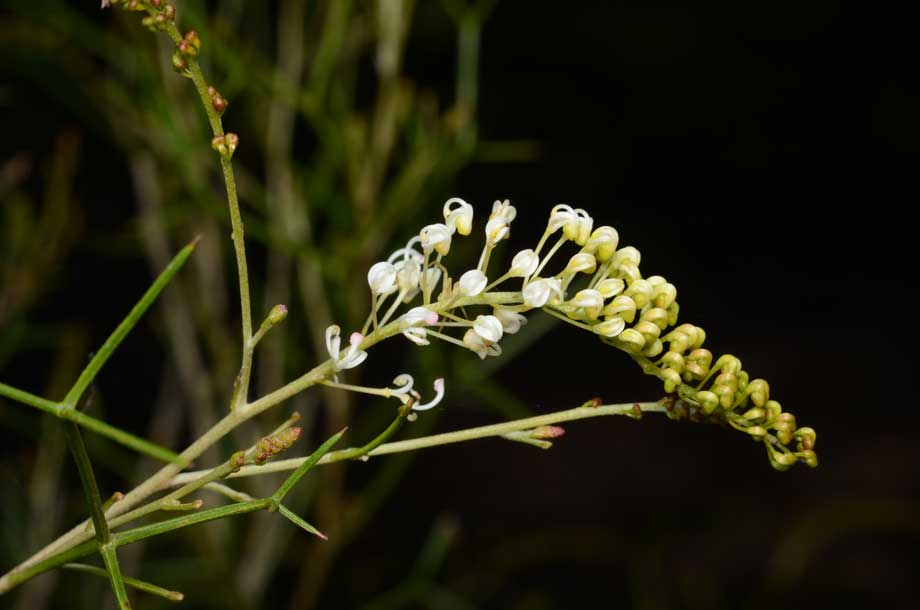
- In the Hunter Region Botanic Gardens

Conservation status
- Endangered (IUCN 3.1)

- Priority Two — Poorly Known Taxa (DEC)

Scientific classification
- Kingdom: Plantae
- Clade: Embryophytes
- Clade: Tracheophytes
- Clade: Angiosperms
- Clade: Eudicots
- Order: Proteales
- Family: Proteaceae
- Genus: Grevillea
- Species: G. kenneallyi

Binomial name
- Grevillea kenneallyi McGill.

= Grevillea kenneallyi =

Species of shrub endemic to Western Australia

Grevillea kenneallyi is a species of flowering plant in the family Proteaceae and is endemic to the south-west of Western Australia. It is a dense, spreading shrub with divided leaves, the end lobes more or less linear, and clusters of white flowers.

== Description ==
Grevillea kenneallyi is a dense, spreading shrub that typically grows to a height of 1–3 m (3 ft 3 in – 9 ft 10 in), it branchlets densely silky-hairy. The leaves are 40–80 mm (1.6–3.1 in) long and divided into three lobes that are often divided again, the end lobes linear to subulate, 10–35 mm (0.39–1.38 in) long and 0.6–1 mm (0.024–0.039 in) wide. The leaflets have a silky-hairy longitudinal groove on the lower surface. The flowers are arranged on the ends of branches and in leaf axils in sometimes branched groups, each branch on a rachis 20–30 mm (0.79–1.18 in) long. The flowers are mostly arranged on one side of the rachis and are white, the pistil 5–6 mm (0.20–0.24 in) long. Flowering occurs from July to September and the fruit is an oblong to elliptic, follicle 9–11 mm (0.35–0.43 in) long.

== Taxonomy ==
Grevillea kenneallyi was first formally described in 1986 by Donald McGillivray in his New Names in Grevillea (Proteaceae) from specimens collected by Roger Coveny near Wongan Hills in 1976. The specific epithet (kenneallyi) honours the botanist Kevin Francis Kenneally.

== Distribution and habitat ==
This grevillea grows in woodland or shrubland in a small area between Wongan Hills, Piawaning and Ballidu in the Avon Wheatbelt bioregion of south-western Western Australia.

== Conservation status ==
Grevillea kenneallyi is listed as 'Priotity Two' by the Western Australian Government Department of Biodiversity, Conservation and Attractions, meaning that it is poorly known and from only one or a few locations, and as 'Endangered' in the IUCN Red List.
