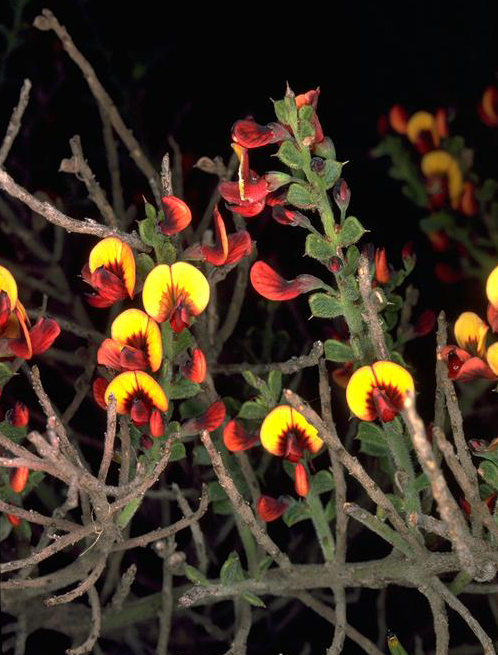
- Near Marchagee

Conservation status
- Endangered (EPBC Act)

Scientific classification
- Kingdom: Plantae
- Clade: Tracheophytes
- Clade: Angiosperms
- Clade: Eudicots
- Clade: Rosids
- Order: Fabales
- Family: Fabaceae
- Subfamily: Faboideae
- Genus: Daviesia
- Species: D. dielsii

Binomial name
- Daviesia dielsii E.Pritz.

= Daviesia dielsii =

Diels' daviesia

Species of flowering plant

Daviesia dielsii, commonly known as Diels' daviesia, is a species of flowering plant in the family Fabaceae and is endemic to the south-west of Western Australia. It is on intricately branched shrub with sharply-pointed, egg-shaped, vertically compressed phyllodes, and yellow and red flowers.

== Description ==
Daviesia dielsii is an intricately branched shrub that typically grows to about 1 m (3 ft 3 in) high and 1.5 m (4 ft 11 in) wide. Its leaves are reduced to moderately crowded, sharply-pointed, vertically compressed, egg-shaped phyllodes with the narrower end towards the base, 2–4 mm (0.079–0.157 in) long, 1–2.5 mm (0.039–0.098 in) wide and thick. The flowers are arranged singly in leaf axils on a pedicel 1.5–5 mm (0.059–0.197 in) long with bracts 0.5–1 mm (0.020–0.039 in) long in clusters at the base. The sepals are 2.0–2.75 mm (0.079–0.108 in) long and joined at the base with lobes about 0.5 mm (0.020 in) long, the two upper lobes are joined and the lower three triangular. The standard petal is elliptic, 5.5–7 mm (0.22–0.28 in) long and wide, and yellow with a red centre. The wings are 6–7 mm (0.24–0.28 in) long and maroon, and the keel is 6.5–7.5 mm (0.26–0.30 in) long and red. Flowering mainly occurs from March to August and the fruit is an inflated, triangular pod 11–13 mm (0.43–0.51 in) long.

== Taxonomy and naming ==
Daviesia dielsii was first formally described in 1904 by Ernst Georg Pritzel in Botanische Jahrbücher für Systematik, Pflanzengeschichte und Pflanzengeographie. The specific epithet (dielsii) honours Ludwig Diels.

== Distribution and habitat ==
Diels' daviesia grows in kwongan heath and on disturbed roadsides in the Dalwallinu-Moora-Three Springs area where it is known from fifteen populations.

== Conservation status ==
Daviesia dielsii is listed as "endangered" under the Australian Government Environment Protection and Biodiversity Conservation Act 1999 and as "Threatened Flora (Declared Rare Flora — Extant)" by the Department of Biodiversity, Conservation and Attractions. The main threats to the species are road maintenance activities and weed invasion.
