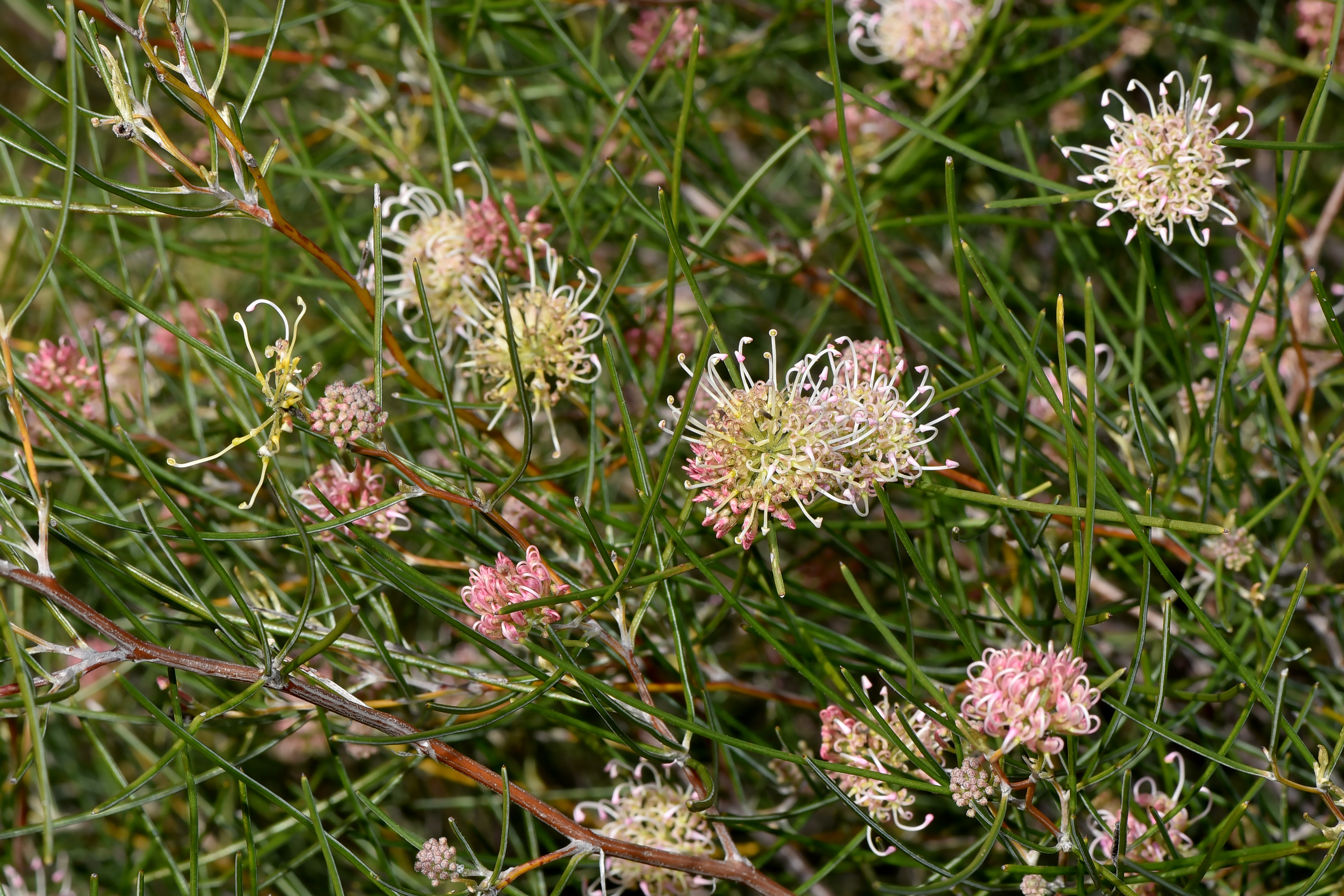

Conservation status
- Least Concern (IUCN 3.1)

Scientific classification
- Kingdom: Plantae
- Clade: Embryophytes
- Clade: Tracheophytes
- Clade: Angiosperms
- Clade: Eudicots
- Order: Proteales
- Family: Proteaceae
- Genus: Grevillea
- Species: G. hakeoides

Binomial name
- Grevillea hakeoides Meisn.

Subspecies
- G. hakeoides Meisn. subsp. hakeoides; G. hakeoides subsp. stenophylla McGill

= Grevillea hakeoides =

Species of shrub endemic to Western Australia

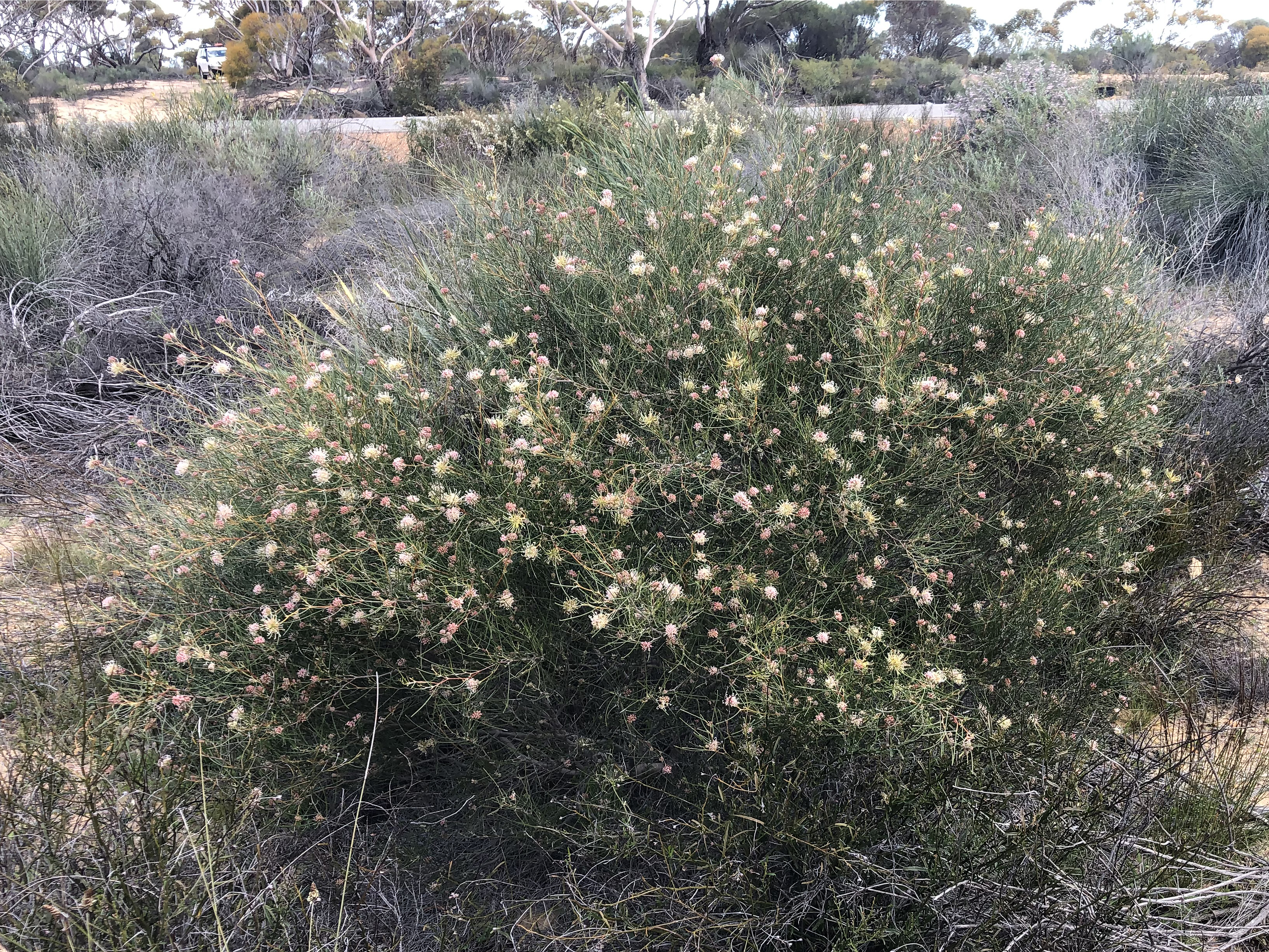
Habit near Marchagee

Grevillea hakeoides is a species of flowering plant in the family Proteaceae and is endemic to the south-west of Western Australia. It is a spreading shrub with flat, linear or more or less-cylindrical leaves and dome-shaped groups of flowers, the colour varying according to subspecies.

== Description ==
Grevillea diversifolia is a spreading shrub that typically grows to a height of 0.5–4 m (1 ft 8 in – 13 ft 1 in) and has many branches. Its adult leaves are linear or more or less cylindrical, 30–110 mm (1.2–4.3 in) long and 0.5–2 mm (0.020–0.079 in) wide with two longitudinal grooves. The flowers are arranged in erect, dome-shaped groups on a rachis 2–5 mm (0.079–0.197 in) long, the pistil 5–12.5 mm (0.20–0.49 in) long, the flower colour varying with subspecies. Flowering occurs from July to October and the fruit is an oblong follicle 7–12 mm (0.28–0.47 in) long.

== Taxonomy ==
Grevillea hakeoides was first formally described in 1848 by Carl Meissner in Johann Georg Christian Lehmann's Plantae Preissianae from specimens collected by James Drummond near the Swan River. The specific epithet (hakeoides) means "Hakea-like".

In 1986 Donald McGillivray described two subspecies in his book, New Names in Grevillea (Proteaceae), and the names are accepted by the Australian Plant Census:

- Grevillea hakeoides Meisn. subsp. hakeoides has more or less cylindrical leaves usually 30–50 mm (1.2–2.0 in) long and 0.5–0.8 mm (0.020–0.031 in) wide, and greenish-white to creamy-grey or pinkish flowers;
- Grevillea hakeoides subsp. stenophylla McGill. has flat, linear leaves 40–110 mm (1.6–4.3 in) long and 0.7–2 mm (0.028–0.079 in) wide, and silvery-grey to white flowers. Subspecies stenophylla was previously known as Grevillea stenophylla W.Fitzg.

== Distribution and habitat ==
Subspecies hakeoides grows in open woodland or tall shrubland in scattered location between Moora, the Wongan Hills, Tammin and Lake Grace in the Avon Wheatbelt, Mallee and Yalgoo biogeographic regions of south-western Western Australia.

Subspecies stenophylla grows in heath, mallee heath or open shrubland, from Dirk Hartog Island to Watheroo and inland as far as Paynes Find in the Avon Wheatbelt, Carnarvon, Coolgardie, Geraldton Sandplains, Mallee, Murchison, Swan Coastal Plain and Yalgoo biogeographic regions.

== Conservation status ==
Grevillea hakeoides is listed as 'Least Concern' on the IUCN Red List of Threatened Species. Both subspecies of G. hakeoides are listed as 'Not threatened' by the Government of Western Australia Department of Biodiversity, Conservation and Attractions.

The species has a widespread distribution and a stable population, though historically, much of its range within the Wheatbelt region of Western Australia has been reduced. In this area, much of the population is primarily limited to road verges where it is threatened by altered fire regimes, clearance and competition with invasive weed species. These threats are currently not substantial enough to affect the general population.

== See also ==
- List of Grevillea species
