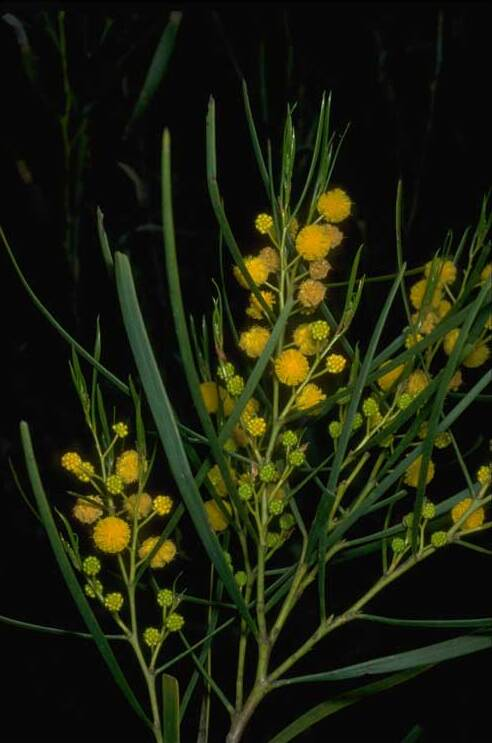
- In Mount Annan Botanic Garden

Scientific classification
- Kingdom: Plantae
- Clade: Tracheophytes
- Clade: Angiosperms
- Clade: Eudicots
- Clade: Rosids
- Order: Fabales
- Family: Fabaceae
- Subfamily: Caesalpinioideae
- Clade: Mimosoid clade
- Genus: Acacia
- Species: A. blakelyi

Binomial name
- Acacia blakelyi Maiden
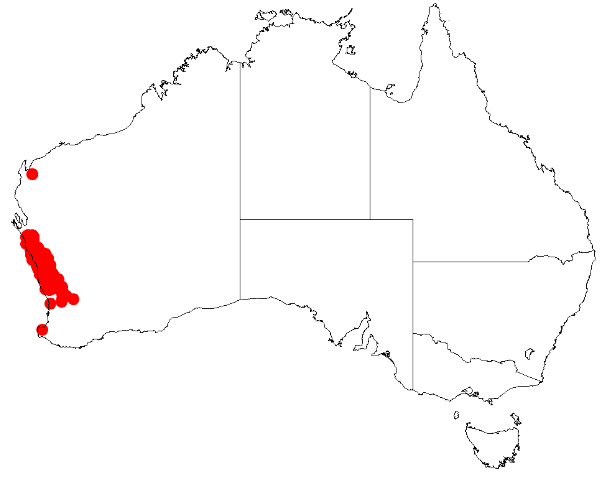
- Occurrence data from AVH

Synonyms
- Racosperma blakelyi (Maiden) Pedley

= Acacia blakelyi =

Species of legume

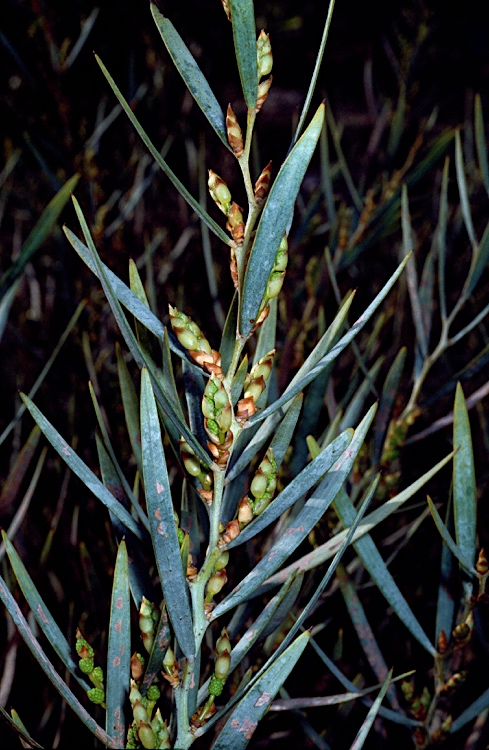
Fruiting pods

Acacia blakelyi is a species of flowering plant in the family Fabaceae and is endemic to the south-west of Western Australia. It is an often dense, glabrous shrub or tree with flattened, linear to very narrowly elliptic phyllodes, spherical heads of bright golden-yellow flowers, and narrowly elliptic pods.

== Description ==
Acacia blakelyi is an often dense, glabrous shrub or tree that typically grows to a height of 1–3 m (3 ft 3 in – 9 ft 10 in). Its branchlets are bendy, often covered with a white, powdery bloom. The phyllodes are flattened, linear to very narrowly elliptic, 70–150 mm (2.8–5.9 in) long and 2–15 mm (0.079–0.591 in) wide, green or glaucous. The is a stipule at the base of the phyllode that falls off as the phyllodes mature. The flowers are borne in spherical heads in three to six headed racemes on a peduncle 7–15 mm (0.28–0.59 in) long, each head 7–8 mm (0.28–0.31 in) in diameter with 20 to 30 bright golden-yellow flowers. Flowering occurs from July to September and the pods are more or less like a strings of beads, straight to slightly curved, thinly leathery to crust-like, up to 160 mm (6.3 in) long and 4–5 mm (0.16–0.20 in) wide containing shiny black seeds 5.5–7 mm (0.22–0.28 in) long with a yellowish-brown aril.

== Taxonomy ==
Acacia blakelyi was first formally described in 1917 by Joseph Maiden in the Journal and Proceedings of the Royal Society of New South Wales from specimens he collected near Mingenew in 1909. The specific epithet (blakelyi) honours William Blakely.

== Distribution ==
This species of wattle grows in sand on beaches, on sandplains or in woodland or shrubland between Cooloomia Nature Reserve about 70 km (43 mi) north of Kalbarri, and Regans Ford and Piawaning, in the Avon Wheatbelt, Geraldton Sandplains, Jarrah Forest, Swan Coastal Plain and Yalgoo bioregions of south-western Western Australia.

== Conservation status ==
Acacia blakelyi is listed as "not threatened" by the Government of Western Australia Department of Biodiversity, Conservation and Attractions.

== See also ==
- List of Acacia species
