= Leioproctus rubiginosus =

Scientific classification
- Kingdom: Animalia
- Phylum: Arthropoda
- Clade: Pancrustacea
- Class: Insecta
- Order: Hymenoptera
- Family: Colletidae
- Genus: Leioproctus
- Species: L. rubiginosus

Binomial name
- Leioproctus rubiginosus (Dalla Torre, 1896)

Synonyms
- Euryglossa rubricata Smith, 1879; Euryglossa rubiginosa Dalla Torre, 1896

Species of bee

Leioproctus rubiginosus, or Leioproctus (Euryglossidia) rubiginosus, is a species of bee in the family Colletidae and subfamily Colletinae. It is endemic to Australia. It was described by Austrian entomologist Karl Wilhelm von Dalla Torre in 1896.

== Distribution and habitat ==
The species occurs in Western Australia. The type locality is Swan River.

== Behaviour ==
The adults are flying mellivores. Flowering plants visited by the bees include Grevillea didymobotrya, as well as Hakea species.

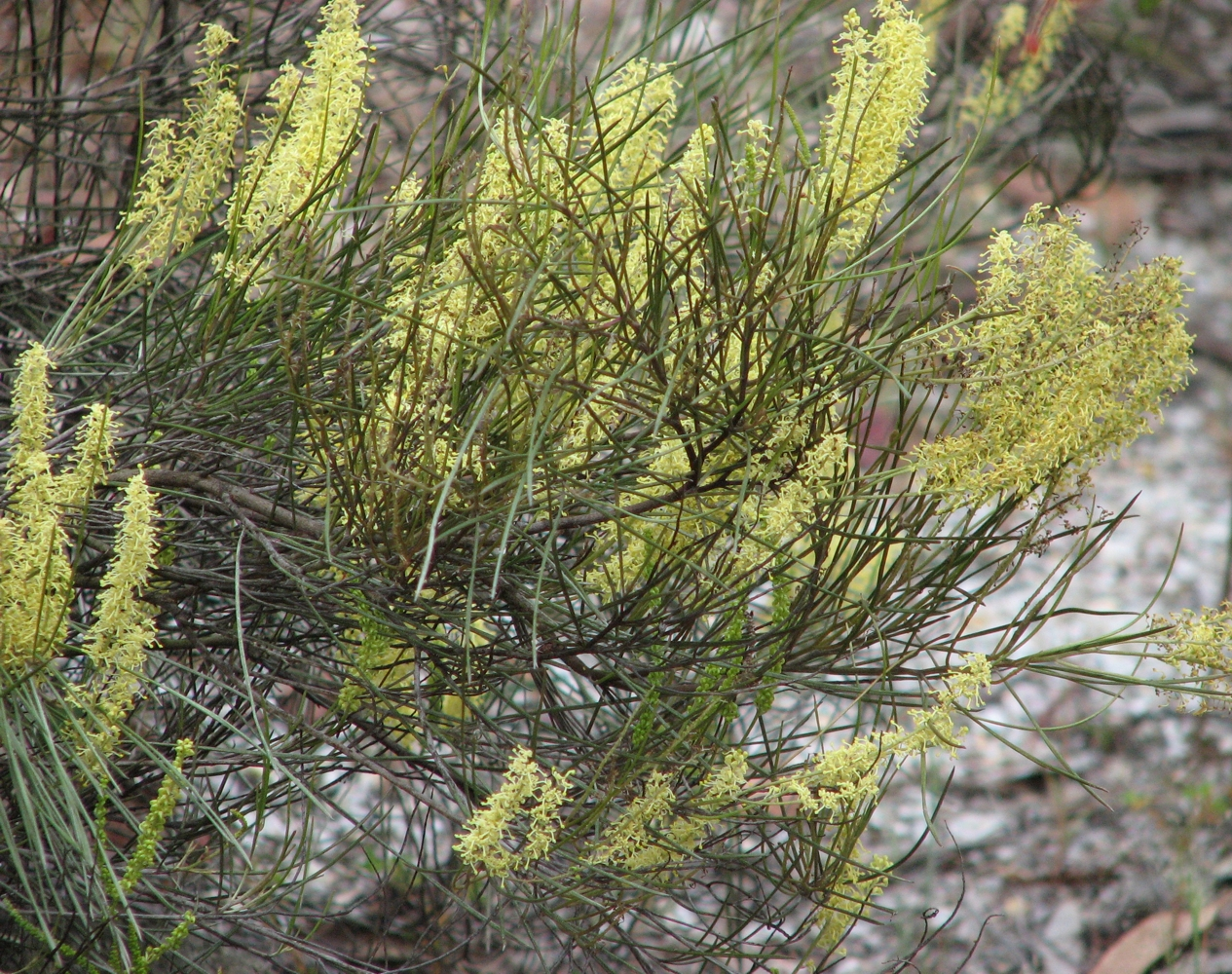
Grevillea didymobotrya, a forage plant of the bees
