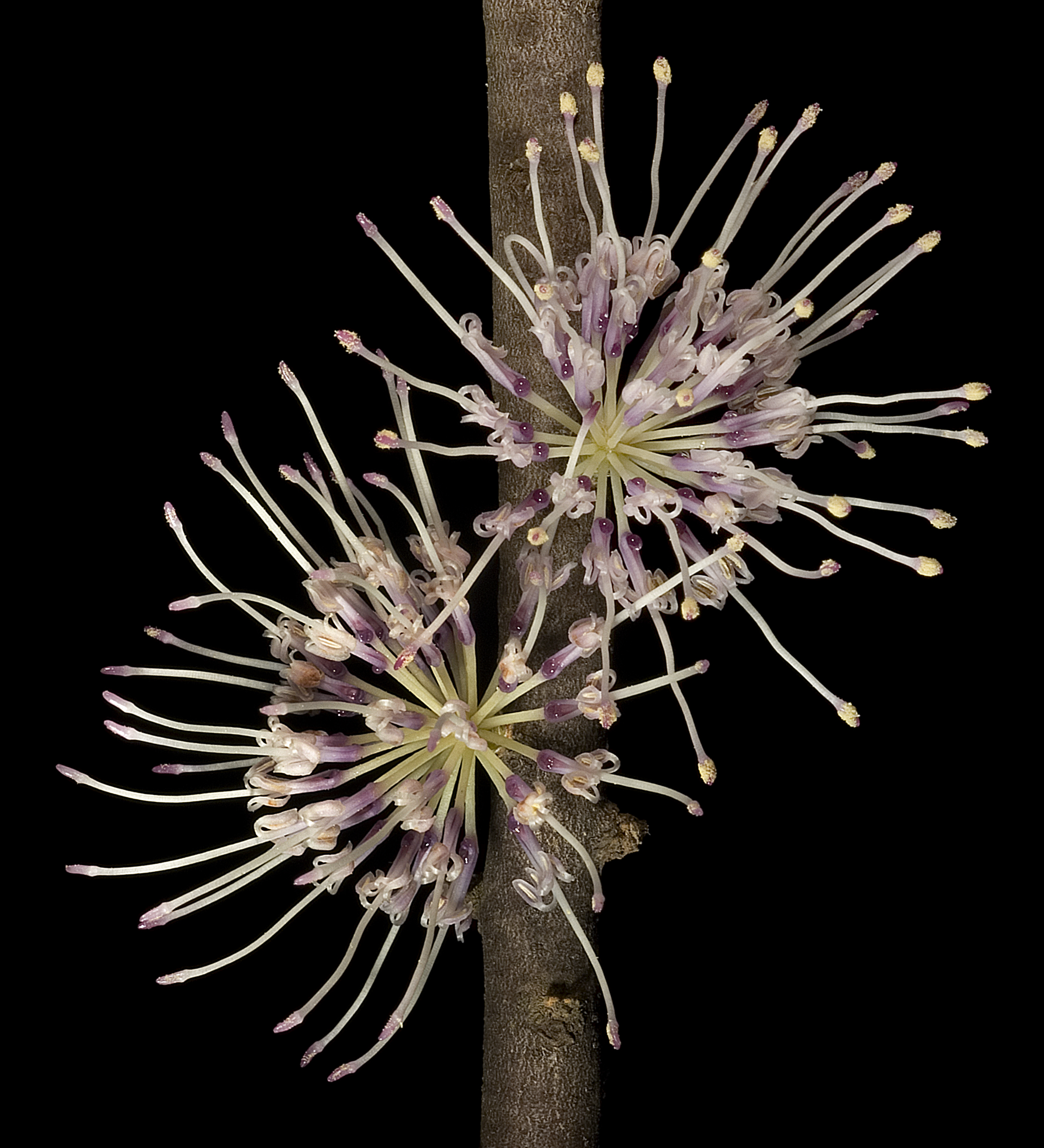

Scientific classification
- Kingdom: Plantae
- Clade: Tracheophytes
- Clade: Angiosperms
- Clade: Eudicots
- Order: Proteales
- Family: Proteaceae
- Genus: Hakea
- Species: H. subsulcata

Binomial name
- Hakea subsulcata Meisn.
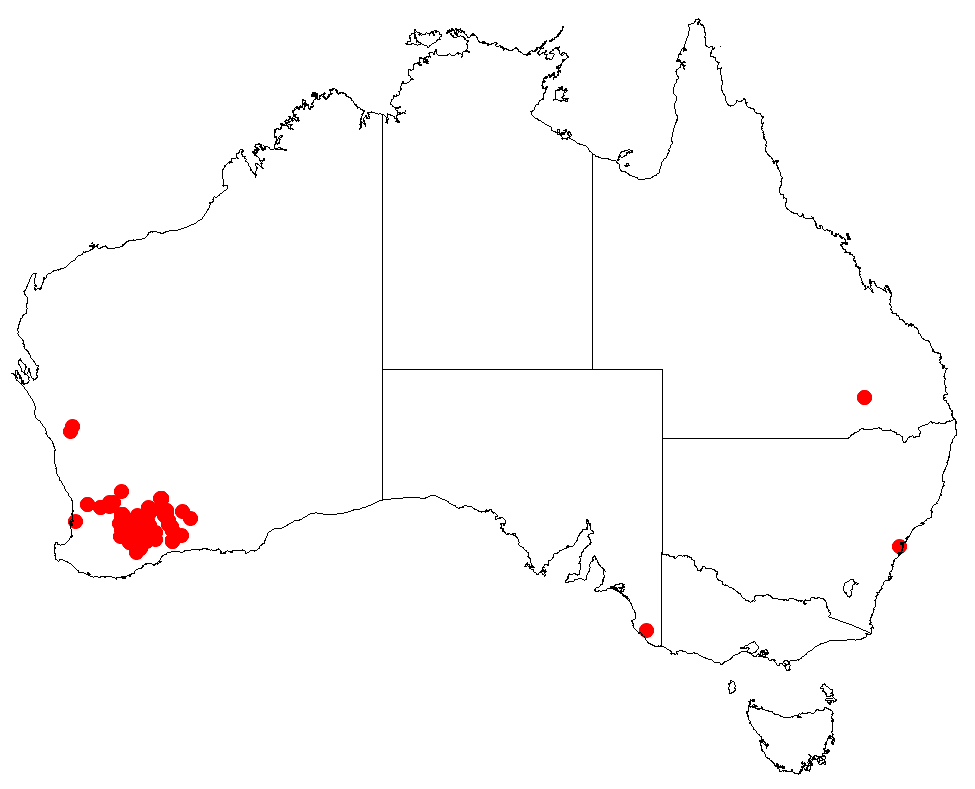
- Occurrence data from Australasian Virtual Herbarium

= Hakea subsulcata =

Species of shrub endemic to Western Australia

Hakea subsulcata is a shrub in the family Proteaceae and is endemic to an area in the Wheatbelt, Great Southern and the Goldfields-Esperance regions of Western Australia. It is an upright, broom-like shrub with needle-shaped leaves and purple-pink flowers from winter to early spring.

== Description ==
Hakea subsulcata is an upright to spreading shrub typically grows to a height of 1 to 3 metres (3 to 10 ft) and does not form a lignotuber. The smaller branches are thickly covered in flattened soft hairs at flowering time. The branches with flowers are smooth. The terete blue-grey leaves are 3–13 cm (1–5 in) long and 0.8–1 mm (0.031–0.039 in) in diameter, ending in a blunt point. The leaves have scattered flattened soft hairs or are smooth with 12 longitudinal veins the length of the leaf. The inflorescence is a spherical shaped umbel of about 50 large purplish, mauve or creamy-white flowers on bare wood or occasionally below leaves and rarely in leaf axils and partially covered by dense foliage. The pedicels are purple and smooth, perianth mauve and the cream pistil 10–13.5 mm (0.39–0.53 in) long. The small fruit are narrow 1–2 cm (0.4–0.8 in) long and less than 1 cm (0.4 in) wide tapering to a conical beak and usually in a cluster. Flowering occurs from May to September.

== Taxonomy and naming ==
Hakea subsulcata was first formally described in 1845 by Carl Meisner and the description was published in Plantae Preissianae. It is named from the Latin sub - somewhat, and sulcatus - grooved, referring to the leaf structure.

== Distribution and habitat ==
This species grows from Wyalkatchem through to Gnowangerup and south to Ravensthorpe. Grows in heath, scrub and woodland in well-drained clay, various coloured sands and loam over laterite, often with gravel, occasionally on ridges. An ornamental species, may be used for hedging and low windbreak.

== Conservation status ==
Hakea subsulcata is classified as "not threatened" by the Western Australian Government.
