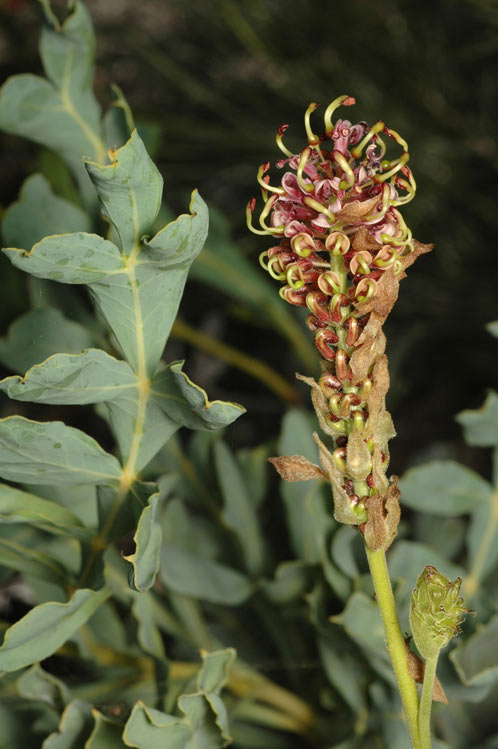
- In Kings Park, Perth

Conservation status
- Least Concern (IUCN 3.1)

Scientific classification
- Kingdom: Plantae
- Clade: Embryophytes
- Clade: Tracheophytes
- Clade: Spermatophytes
- Clade: Angiosperms
- Clade: Eudicots
- Order: Proteales
- Family: Proteaceae
- Genus: Grevillea
- Species: G. eryngioides

Binomial name
- Grevillea eryngioides Benth.

= Grevillea eryngioides =

Species of shrub endemic to Western Australia

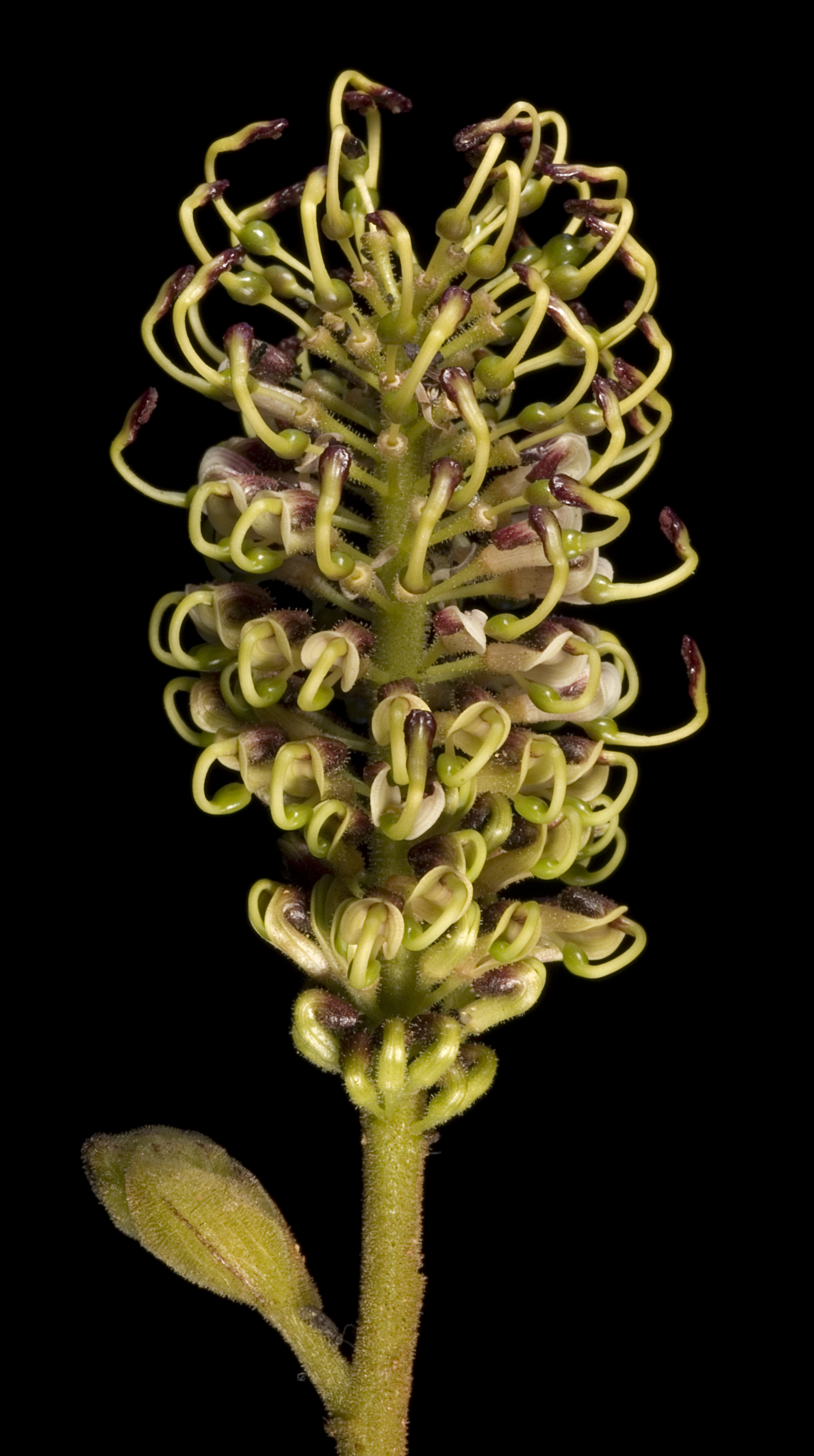
Inflorescence detail

Grevillea eryngioides, commonly called curly grevillea, is a species of flowering plant in the family Proteaceae and is endemic to the south-west of Western Australia. It is shrub with low clumping foliage with erect flowering spikes, divided leaves with oblong to egg-shaped lobes, and groups of purplish-red flowers with a yellow style.

== Description ==
Grevillea eryngioides is a glaucous shrub with low, clumping foliage but forms flowering spikes typically 0.5–1.5 m (1 ft 8 in – 4 ft 11 in) high, and that forms suckers. The leaves are mostly 100–180 mm (3.9–7.1 in) long and 30–65 mm (1.2–2.6 in) wide with two to five pairs of oblong to egg-shaped lobes with the narrower end towards the base, the lobes 10–50 mm (0.39–1.97 in) long and 20–30 mm (0.79–1.18 in) wide with wavy edges. Both surfaces of the leaves are glabrous and glaucous. The flowers are arranged on the ends of branchlets or in leaf axils on a long, usually branched flowering spike, in dense, oval groups with many flowers on a rachis 20–70 mm (0.79–2.76 in) long. The flowers are light purplish-red with a yellowish, red- to blackish-tipped style, the pistil 9–11 mm (0.35–0.43 in) long. Flowering mostly occurs from September to November and the fruit is a sticky, oval to lens-shaped follicle 14–21 mm (0.55–0.83 in) long.

== Taxonomy ==
Grevillea eryngioides was first formally described in 1870 by George Bentham in Flora Australiensis from specimens collected by James Drummond. The specific epithet (eryngioides) means "Eryngium-like".

== Distribution and habitat ==
Curly grevillea grows in heath or shrubland and is widespread between Morawa, Lake Grace, Coolgardie and Peak Charles National Park in the Avon Wheatbelt, Coolgardie, Esperance Plains, Geraldton Sandplains and Mallee biogeographic regions of south-western Western Australia.

== Conservation status ==
Grevillea eryngioides is listed as least concern on the IUCN Red List of Threatened Species, as it has a widespread distribution and a stable population. Although much of this species' distribution and population within the Wheatbelt region of Western Australia has been rapidly lost in the past due to clearance for agriculture, this has mostly ceased. Current threats to G. eryngioides include competition with invasive weeds and clearance of roadside verges. This species is present in a few protected areas and no additional conservation measures are requires at present.

== See also ==
- List of Grevillea species
