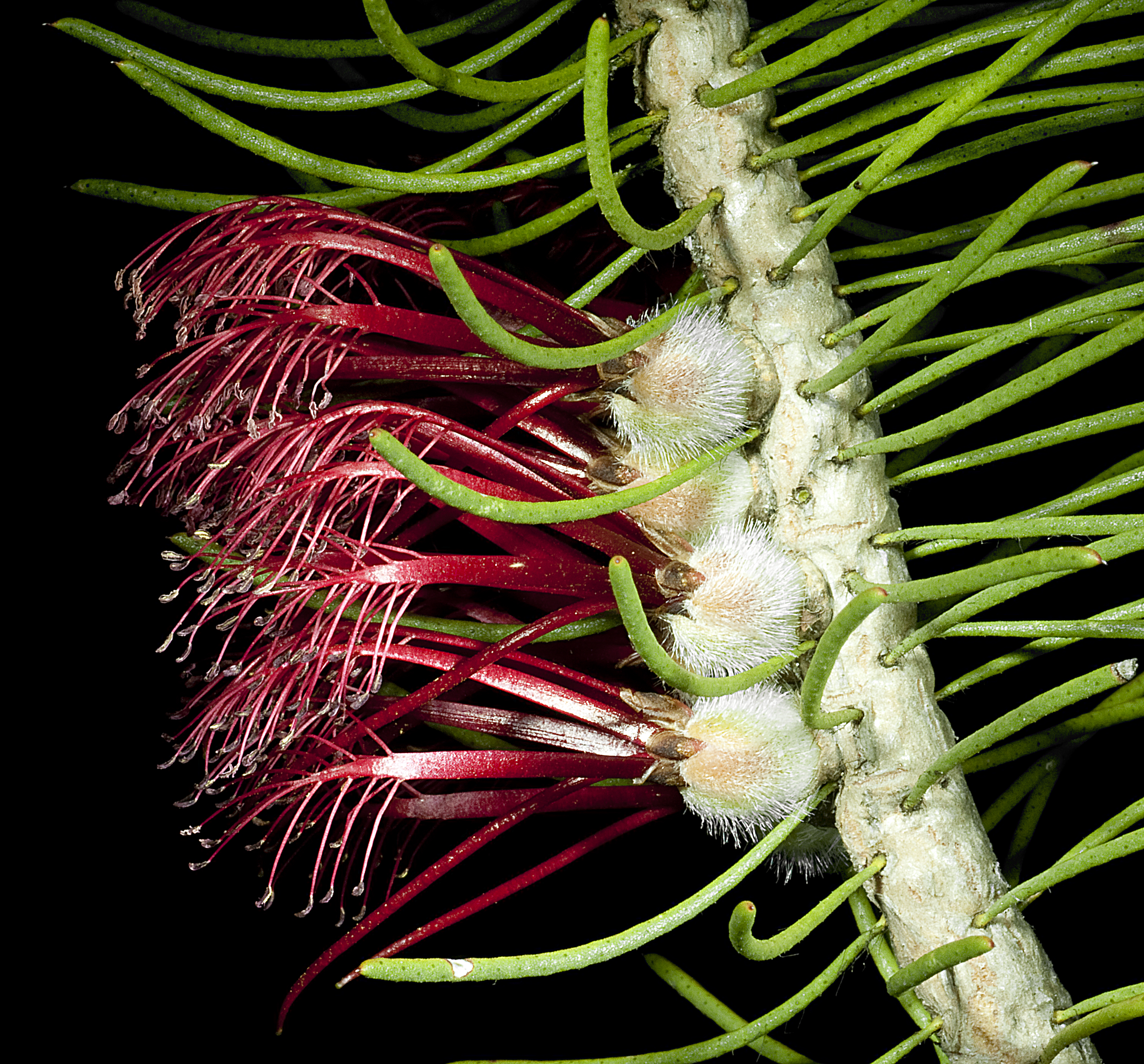

Scientific classification
- Kingdom: Plantae
- Clade: Tracheophytes
- Clade: Angiosperms
- Clade: Eudicots
- Clade: Rosids
- Order: Myrtales
- Family: Myrtaceae
- Genus: Calothamnus
- Species: C. hirsutus

Binomial name
- Calothamnus hirsutus Hawkeswood

Synonyms
- Melaleuca hirsuta (Hawkeswood) Craven & R.D.Edwards

= Calothamnus hirsutus =

Species of flowering plant

Calothamnus hirsutus is a plant in the myrtle family, Myrtaceae and is endemic to the south-west of Western Australia. It is a small, spreading shrub with prominent hairs on the leaves giving them a smoky appearance. The flowers are deep red and are usually in dense clusters between the older leaves.

== Description ==
Calothamnus hirsutus is a compact, many-branched shrub growing to a height of about 1.0 metre (3 ft). The older branches are corky but the younger shoots are densely hairy. Its leaves are usually 20–25 millimetres (0.8–1 in) long, 0.5–0.8 millimetres (0.02–0.03 in) in diameter, cylindrical in shape and taper to a non-prickly point. They have many well-spaced, upright hairs on their surface and conspicuous oil glands.

The flowers are deep red and in dense clusters of 4 to 8 individual flowers, usually on the older branches and between the leaves. The petals are 5–6 millimetres (0.20–0.24 in) long, thin, papery and orange to brown. The stamens are arranged in 5 claw-like bundles with 20 to 25 stamens per bundle. Flowering occurs from October to February and is followed by fruits which are woody, almost spherical capsules which are hairy at first but become glabrous with age. The fruits are 5–6 millimetres (0.20–0.24 in) in diameter.

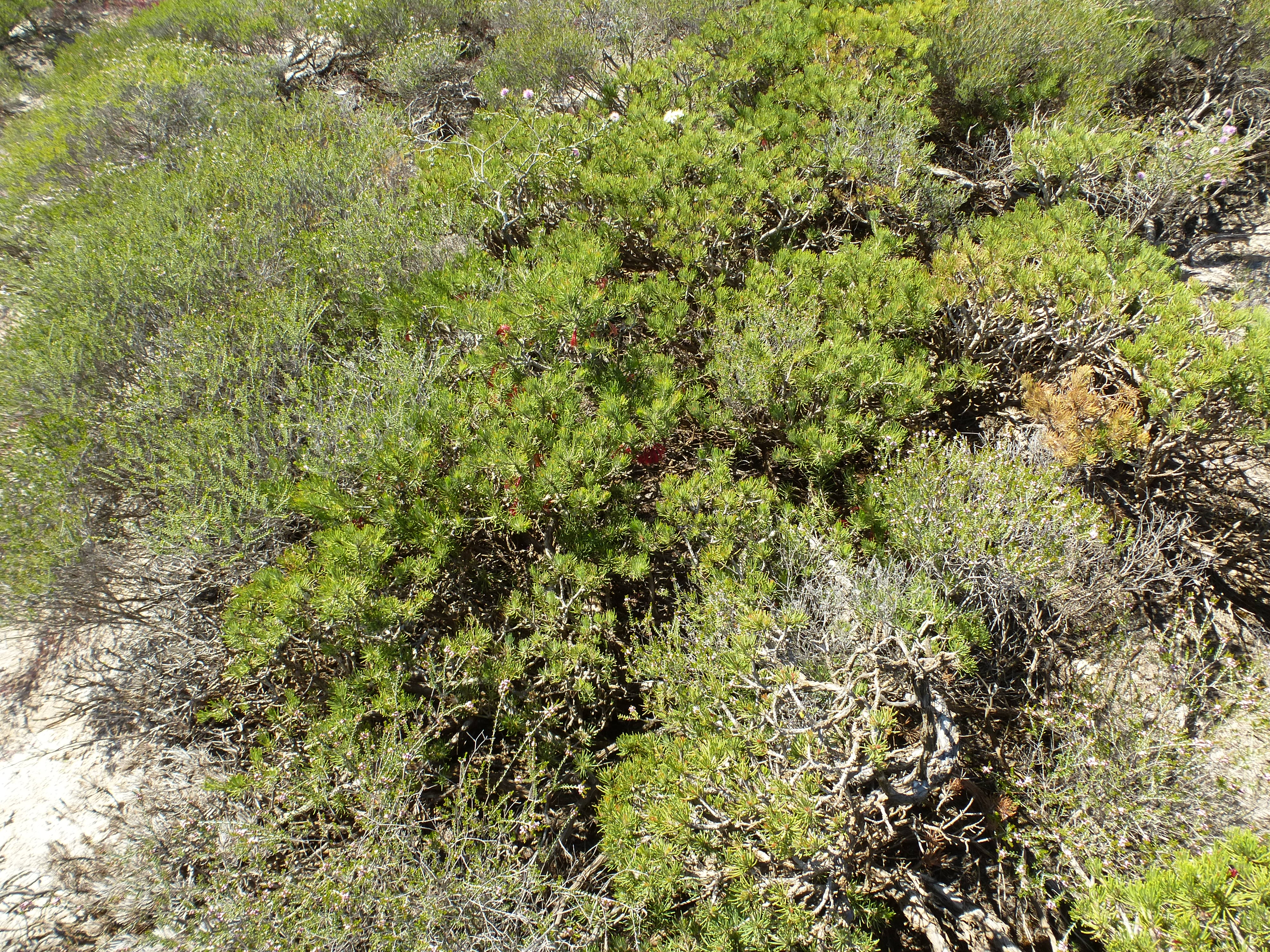
Habit

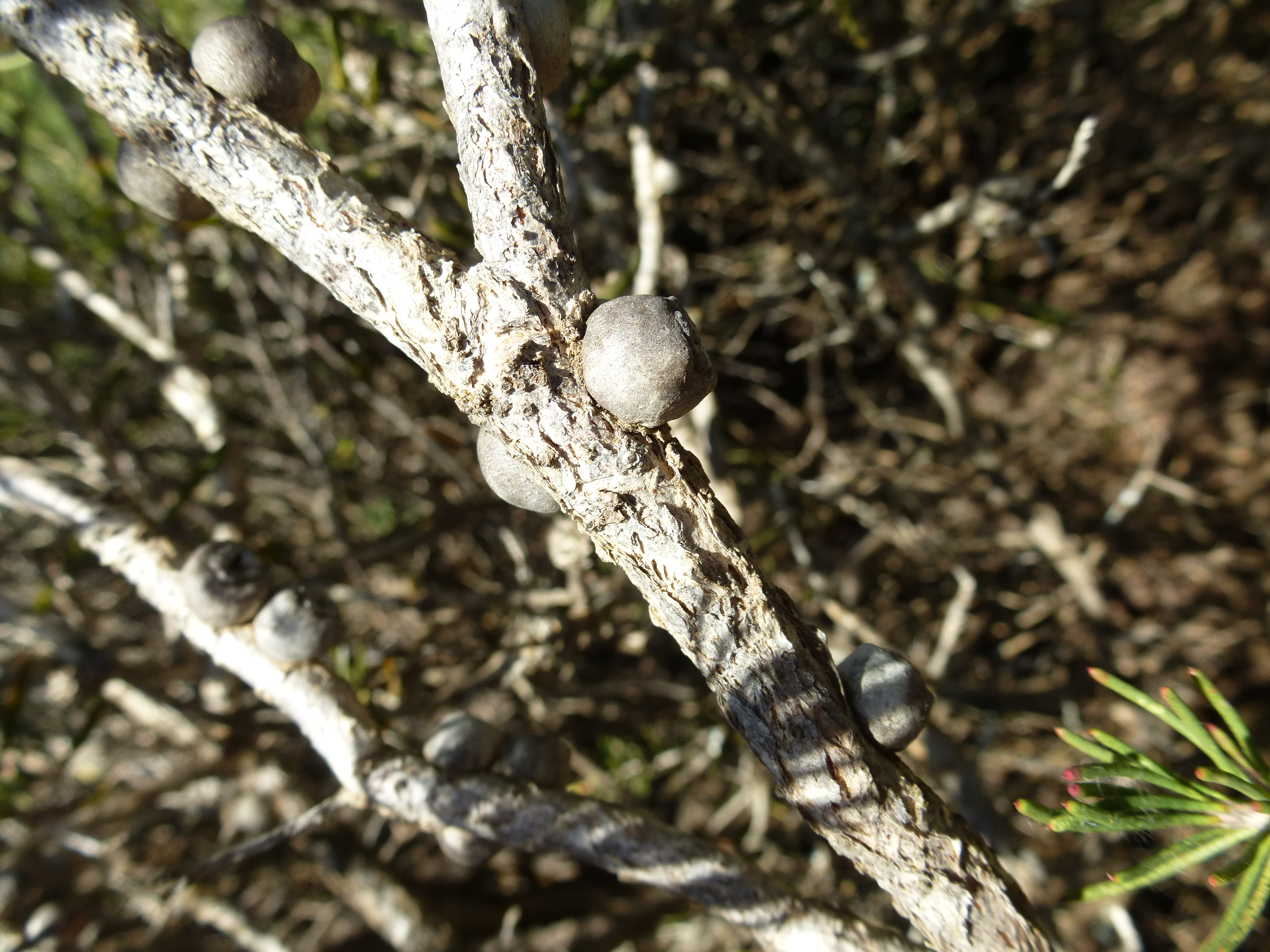
Fruit

== Taxonomy and naming ==
Calothamnus hirsutus was first formally described in 1984 by Trevor J. Hawkeswood in the botanical journal Nuytsia. The specific epithet (hirsutus) is a Latin word meaning "rough" or "hairy" referring to the long, simple hairs on the leaves.

In 2014 Craven, Edwards and Cowley proposed that the species be renamed Melaleuca hirsuta but the name is not accepted at the Australian Plant Census.

== Distribution and habitat ==
Calothamnus hirsutus occurs from near Arrowsmith to the suburbs of Perth and the Helena Valley in the Avon Wheatbelt, Geraldton Sandplains, Jarrah Forest, Swan Coastal Plain biogeographic regions. There is a significant population in the Anstey-Keane Dampland reserve in the Perth suburb of Forrestdale.

== Conservation ==
Calothamnus hirsutus is classified as "not threatened" by the Western Australian Government Department of Parks and Wildlife.
