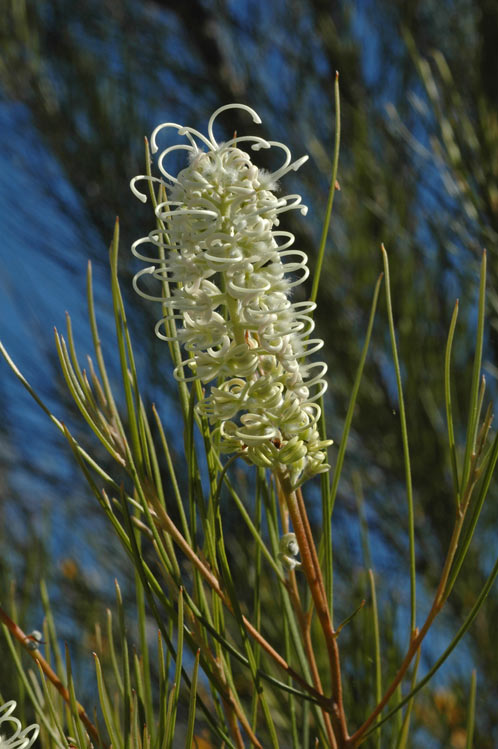
- In Kings Park

Scientific classification
- Kingdom: Plantae
- Clade: Tracheophytes
- Clade: Angiosperms
- Clade: Eudicots
- Order: Proteales
- Family: Proteaceae
- Genus: Grevillea
- Species: G. pterosperma

Binomial name
- Grevillea pterosperma F.Muell.

= Grevillea pterosperma =

Species of shrub endemic to Australia

Grevillea pterosperma, commonly known as desert grevillea or desert spider-flower, is a species of flowering plant in the family Proteaceae and is endemic to continental Australia. It is an erect, rounded shrub with linear leaves, sometimes divided with up to six linear lobes, and cylindrical clusters of greyish white and creamy white flowers with a cream-coloured to pale yellow style.

== Description ==
Grevillea pterosperma is an erect, rounded shrub that typically grows to a height of 1.5–4 m (4 ft 11 in – 13 ft 1 in). Its leaves are pointed upwards, more or less linear, 60–180 mm (2.4–7.1 in) long and 0.8–2 mm (0.031–0.079 in) wide, sometimes divided with up to 6 linear lobes 1.0–1.5 mm (0.039–0.059 in) wide. The upper surface has 3 to 5 longitudinal grooves, and the edges are rolled under, obscuring the lower surface. The flowers are arranged in dense, cylindrical clusters 50–160 mm (2.0–6.3 in) long, the flowers at the end of the clusters usually opening first. The flowers are greyish white and woolly- to silky-hairy on the outside, creamy-white and more or less glabrous inside, the style cream-coloured to pale yellow and the pistil 12–21 mm (0.47–0.83 in) long. Flowering occurs from June to January and the fruit is a hairy follicle 15–20 mm (0.59–0.79 in) long.

== Taxonomy ==
Grevillea pterosperma was first formally described in 1854 by Victorian Government Botanist Ferdinand von Mueller, in Transactions of the Philosophical Society of Victoria, based on plants observed "[I]n the Mallee scrub on sandhills towards the junction of the Murray and Murrumbidgee". The specific epithet (pterosperma) means "wing-seeded".

== Distribution and habitat ==
Desert grevillea grows on and between sand dunes and on sandplains and in shrublands, woodlands and mallee in mostly inland areas of the Northern Territory and all mainland states, except Queensland.
