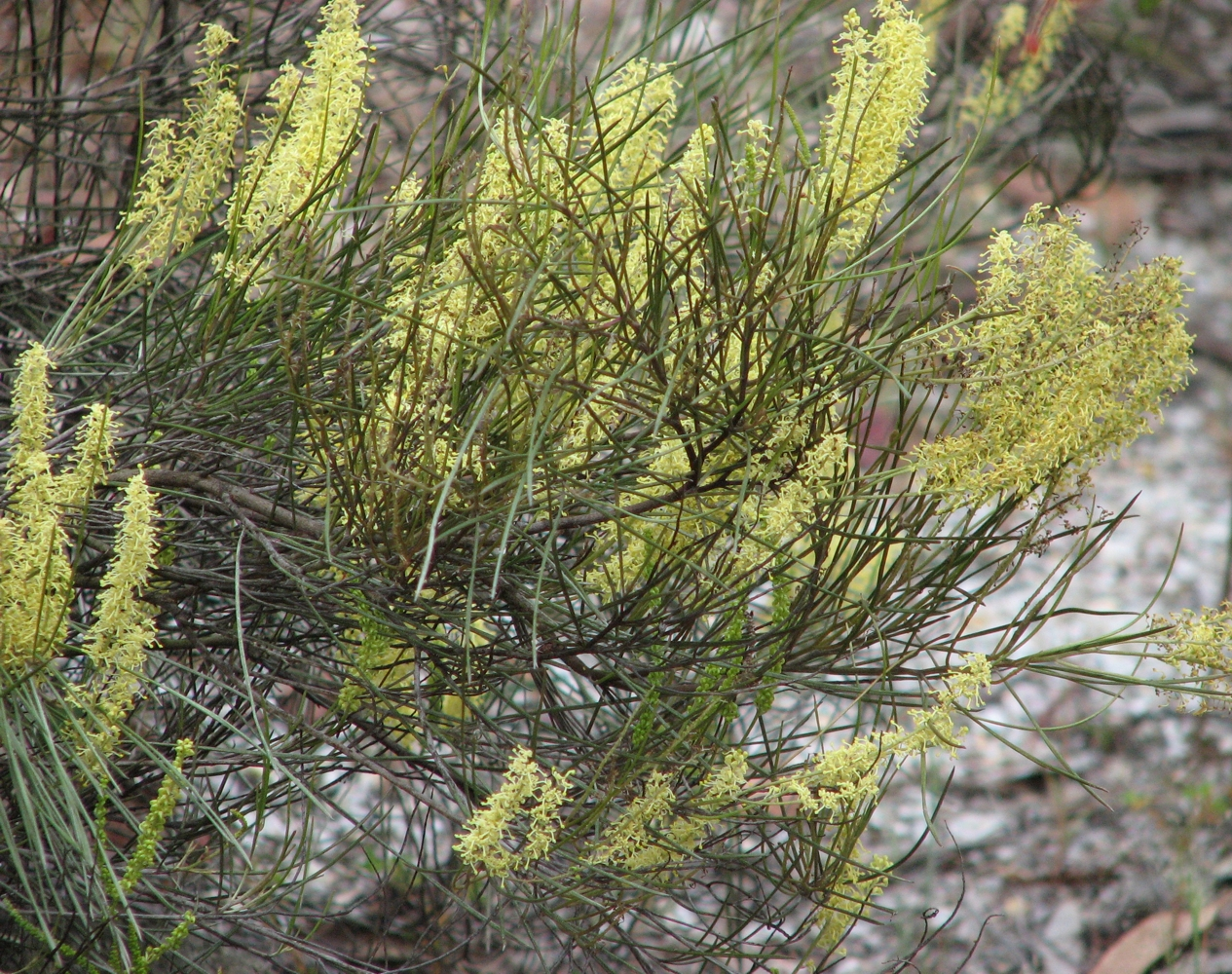
- In Maranoa Gardens

Conservation status
- Least Concern (IUCN 3.1)

Scientific classification
- Kingdom: Plantae
- Clade: Embryophytes
- Clade: Tracheophytes
- Clade: Spermatophytes
- Clade: Angiosperms
- Clade: Eudicots
- Order: Proteales
- Family: Proteaceae
- Genus: Grevillea
- Species: G. didymobotrya

Binomial name
- Grevillea didymobotrya McGill.

= Grevillea didymobotrya =

Species of shrub native to Western Australia

Grevillea didymobotrya is a species of flowering plant in the family Proteaceae and is endemic to the south-west of Western Australia. It is an erect shrub with simple leaves, the size and shape depending on subspecies, and cylindrical groups of yellow or cream-coloured flowers.

== Description ==
Grevillea didymobotrya is an erect shrub that typically grows to a height of 0.3–5 m (1 ft 0 in – 16 ft 5 in). It has simple leaves, either linear, more or less cylindrical, 25–170 mm (0.98–6.69 in) long and 0.5–1.3 mm (0.020–0.051 in) wide, or mostly narrowly elliptic, 10–70 mm (0.39–2.76 in) long and 3–7 mm (0.12–0.28 in) wide, depending on subspecies. The flowers are arranged in cylindrical racemes 35–60 mm (1.4–2.4 in) long and are yellow, the pistil 3–6 mm (0.12–0.24 in) long and glabrous. Flowering occurs from May to October and the fruit is an elliptic to oval follicle 11–16 mm (0.43–0.63 in) long.

== Taxonomy ==
Grevillea didymobotrya by Carl Meissner in Prodromus Systematis Naturalis Regni Vegetabilis in 1856, from material collected by James Drummond in the Swan River Colony. The specific epithet (didymobotrya) is derived from Ancient Greek words meaning "paired" and "bunch of grapes", referring to the racemes.

In 1986, Donald McGillivray described two subspecies in his book, New Names in Grevillea (Proteaceae) and the names are accepted by the Australian Plant Census:

- Grevillea didymobotrya Meisn subsp. didymobotrya has more or less cylindrical to linear leaves 25–170 mm (0.98–6.69 in) long and 0.5–1.3 mm (0.020–0.051 in) wide with up to seventeen longitudinal ridges, and bright yellow or cream-coloured flowers mostly from August to January;
- Grevillea didymobotrya subsp. involuta McGill. has mostly narrow elliptic to egg-shaped leaves with the narrower end towards the base, 10–70 mm (0.39–2.76 in) long and 3–7 mm (0.12–0.28 in) wide with up to eleven longitudinal ridges on the lower surface, and yellow flowers in August and September.

== Distribution and habitat ==
This species of grevillea grows in heath, shrubland or mallee on sandplains and is widespread from near Shark Bay to Cundeelee Balladonia and Ravensthorpe. Subspecies involuta has a more restricted distribution between Geraldton and Mullewa.

== Conservation status ==
Grevillea didymobotrya is listed as least concern on the IUCN Red List of Threatened Species. Both subspecies of G. didymobotrya are listed as not threatened by the Government of Western Australia Department of Biodiversity, Conservation and Attractions.
