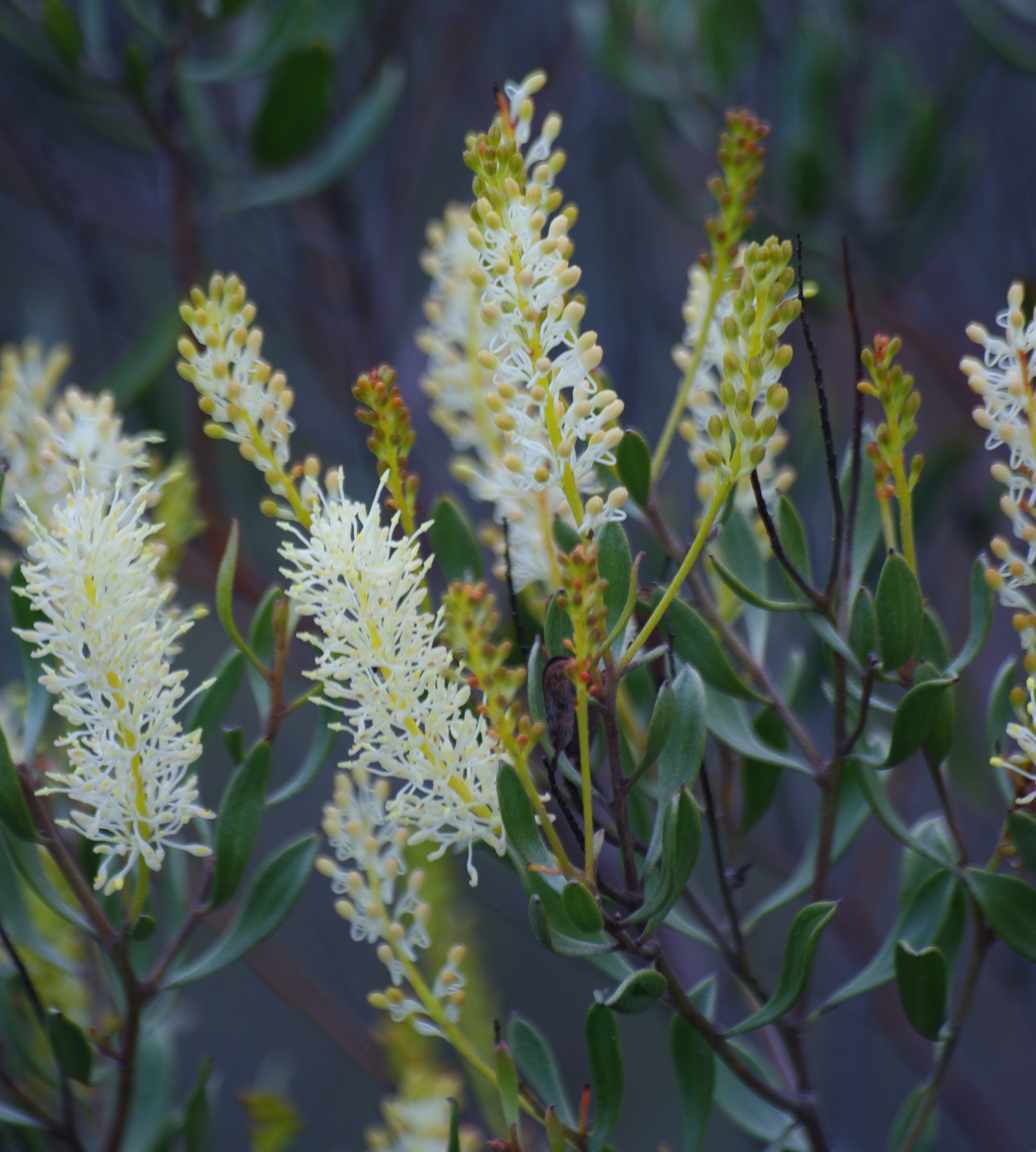
- At Quairading, Western Australia

Scientific classification
- Kingdom: Plantae
- Clade: Tracheophytes
- Clade: Angiosperms
- Clade: Eudicots
- Order: Proteales
- Family: Proteaceae
- Genus: Grevillea
- Species: G. integrifolia

Binomial name
- Grevillea integrifolia (Endl.) Meisn.

Synonyms
- Anadenia integrifolia Endl.; Grevillea integrifolia (Endl.) Meisn. subsp. integrifolia; Grevillea integrifolia (Endl.) Meisn. var. integrifolia

= Grevillea integrifolia =

Species of shrub endemic to Western Australia

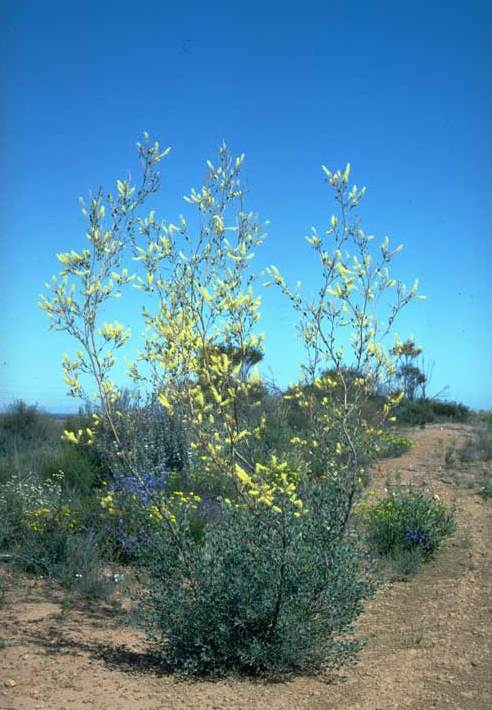
Near Newdegate

Grevillea integrifolia, commonly known as entire-leaved grevillea, is a species of flowering plant in the family Proteaceae and is endemic to the south-west of Western Australia. It is an erect shrub with egg-shaped leaves, the narrower end towards the base, and cylindrical clusters of white to creamy-white flowers.

== Description ==
Grevillea integrifolia is an erect shrub that typically grows to a height of 1–3 m (3 ft 3 in – 9 ft 10 in). Its leaves are egg-shaped with the narrower end towards the base, 10–50 mm (0.39–1.97 in) long and 2–10 mm (0.079–0.394 in) wide, sometimes curving upwards. The flowers are white to creamy-white, sometimes with a pink tinge and are arranged in cylindrical, sometimes branched clusters on a rachis 30–45 mm (1.2–1.8 in) long. The pistil is 5.5–6.5 mm (0.22–0.26 in) long and glabrous. Flowering mainly occurs from October to December and the fruit is a smooth, narrowly oblong follicle 9–11 mm (0.35–0.43 in) long.

== Taxonomy ==
The species was first formally described in Stirpium Australasicarum Herbarii Hugeliani Decades Tres in 1830 by Austrian botanist Stephan Endlicher who gave it the name Anadenia integrifolia. The species was transferred to the genus Grevillea as Grevillea integrifolia by Swiss botanist Carl Meissner in 1856. The specific epithet (integrifolia) means "whole-leaved", that it not toothed or lobed.

== Distribution and habitat ==
Entire-leaved grevillea usually grows in heath and occurs near Burracoppin, Quairading, Kukerin and Corrigin in the Avon Wheatbelt, Jarrah Forest and Mallee bioregions of south-western Western Australia.
