= Marchagee, Western Australia =

Marchagee
- Town
- Coordinates: 30°03′S 116°04′E
- Country: Australia
- State: Western Australia
- LGA(s): Shire of Coorow
- Location: 243 km (151 mi) north of Perth; 65 km (40 mi) north of Moora; 62 km (39 mi) west of Dalwallinu
- Established: 1927

Government
  - State electorate(s): Moore
  - Federal division(s): Durack

Area
  - Total: 557.6 km^{2} (215.3 sq mi)
- Elevation: 324 m (1,063 ft)

Population
  - Total(s): 45 (SAL 2021)
- Postcode: 6515

Marchagee is a small townsite located 243 km north of Perth in the Mid West region of Western Australia.

A reserve for travellers was kept aside in the area in 1876, and the name recorded by the surveyor was Marchagee Well. The name is Aboriginal but its meaning is unknown.

In 1899 the Midland Railway Company established a station at Marchagee.

Some large lots were surveyed for agricultural purposes in 1906, and the townsite was gazetted in 1927.

The surrounding areas produce wheat and other cereal crops. The town is a receival site for Cooperative Bulk Handling.
