= Piawaning, Western Australia =

Piawaning
- Town
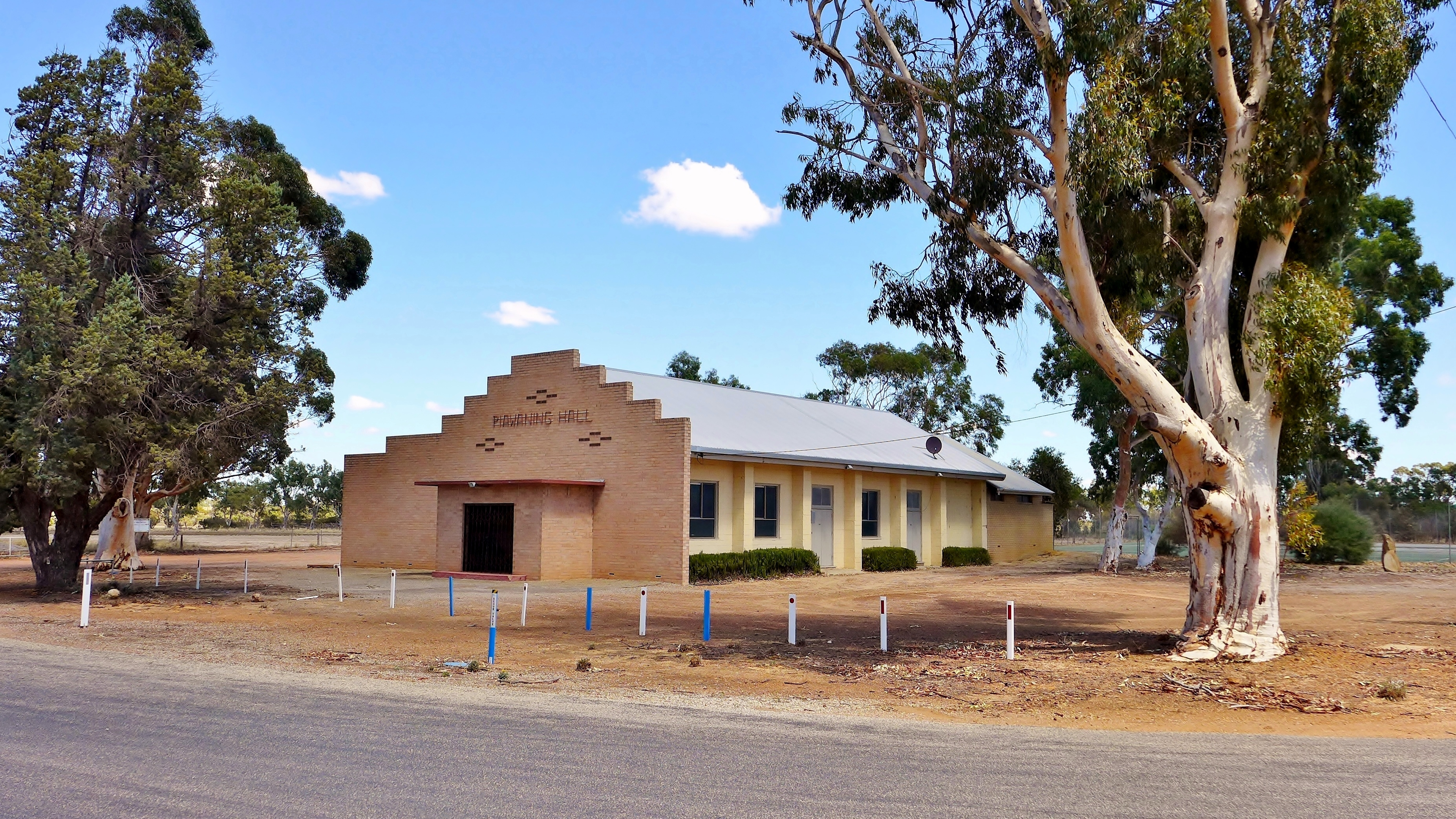
- Piawaning Hall, 2016

- Coordinates: 30°50′20″S 116°23′13″E
- Country: Australia
- State: Western Australia
- LGA(s): Shire of Victoria Plains
- Location: 160 km (99 mi) NE of Perth; 28 km (17 mi) NE of New Norcia
- Established: 1920

Government
  - State electorate(s): Moore
  - Federal division(s): Durack

Area
  - Total: 173.7 km^{2} (67.1 sq mi)
- Elevation: 326 m (1,070 ft)

Population
  - Total(s): 61 (SAL 2021)
- Postcode: 6572

The townsite of Piawaning is located in the northern agricultural region, 160 km north-east of Perth and 28 km north-east of New Norcia. At the 2006 census, Piawaning had a population of 309.

A northward extension of the railway line from Toodyay to Bolgart was planned in 1913, and was to terminate near Piawaning Spring. When the exact route of the line was settled in 1919 the government decided to set aside land for a townsite at the terminus. Piawaning, the nearest Aboriginal name, was selected and the townsite was gazetted in 1920. Piawaning Spring has been shown on maps of the area since 1877 when recorded by a surveyor, but the meaning of the name is not known.

The surrounding areas produce wheat and other cereal crops. The town is a receival site for Cooperative Bulk Handling.
