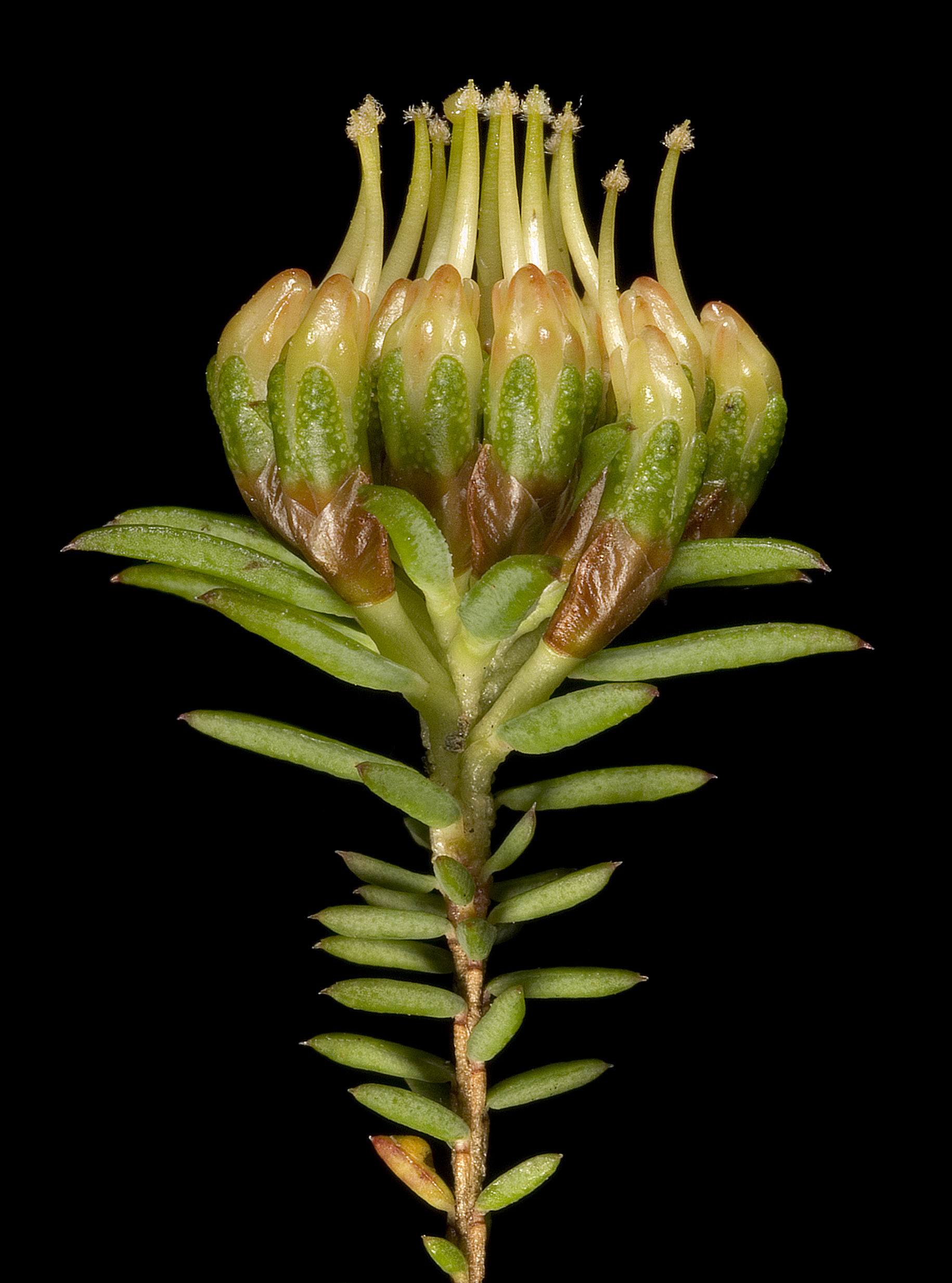
- Darwinia hortiorum
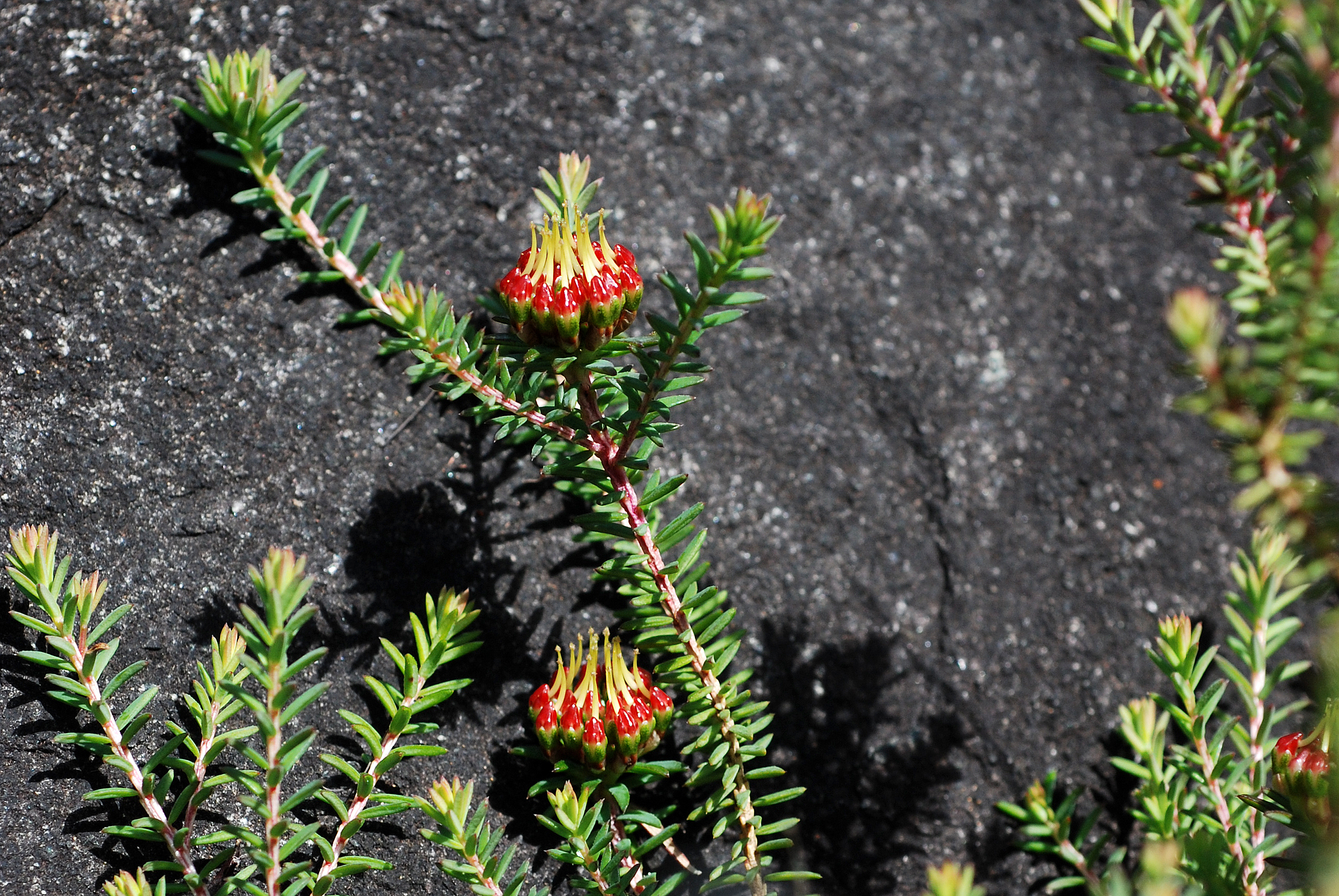

Conservation status
- Priority One — Poorly Known Taxa (DEC)

Scientific classification
- Kingdom: Plantae
- Clade: Tracheophytes
- Clade: Angiosperms
- Clade: Eudicots
- Clade: Rosids
- Order: Myrtales
- Family: Myrtaceae
- Genus: Darwinia
- Species: D. hortiorum

Binomial name
- Darwinia hortiorum K.R.Thiele

= Darwinia hortiorum =

Species of flowering plant

Darwinia hortiorum is a species of flowering plant in the myrtle family Myrtaceae and is endemic to Western Australia. It is a compact, densely branched shrub with small leaves and inflorescences composed of up to twenty flowers with glossy, pale yellow to reddish petals and fleshy dark green sepals surrounded by papery brown bracteoles.

== Description ==
Darwinia hortiorum is an erect to spreading, densely branched shrub with a compact habit. It typically grows to a height of 0.8 metres (2.6 ft) and a width of 0.8 m (2.6 ft). The glabrous plant is single-stemmed at the base with spreading main branches bearing many ascending, leafy branchlets with pale stems. Older stems have a covering of reddish-brown, papery bark that peels off in flakes. The leaves are arranged alternately, widely spaced, narrow egg-shaped to almost linear, 3–6 mm (0.1–0.2 in) long and 1–2 mm (0.04–0.08 in) wide. The inflorescences appear at the ends of the branches and are composed of groups of 14 to 22 flowers. Each flower has five smooth, glossy, yellowish petals tinged with crimson, five warty dark green sepals with prominent oil glands and two papery brown bracteoles. Ten stamens protrude between the petals and the style is curved towards the centre of the inflorescence. Flowering occurs between late September and early December. The plant is distinctive with no obvious close relatives, although it superficially resembles Darwinia thymoides which is found in the same habitat.

== Taxonomy and naming ==
Darwinia hortiorum was first formally described in 2010 by Kevin Thiele and the description was published in a paper entitled Darwinia hortiorum (Myrtaceae: Chamelaucieae), a new species from the Darling Range, Western Australia in the journal Nuytsia. The specific epithet (hortiorum) honours Fred and Jean Hort, described as "enthusiastic field botanists, expert plant-hunters and national treasures", who collected the first samples of D.hortiorum in 2008 from granite outcrops in the Monadnocks Conservation Park.

== Distribution ==
This shrub is found in a small area near Wandering in the South West region of Western Australia. It is distributed throughout five localities in the Jarrah Forest biogeographic region, occupying an area of approximately 9 square kilometres (3 sq mi) in the Monadnocks Conservation Park and neighbouring Boonering State Forest. All known populations are found amongst granite outcrops and their drainage lines growing in shallow granitic clay loam soil with broken rock. Associated species include Allocasuarina humilis, Andersonia species, Grevillea bipinnatifida, Grevillea manglesii, Banksia recurvistylis, Hakea undulata, Hakea trifurcata, Verticordia insignis, Calytrix depressa, Xanthorrhoea preissii and Hibbertia hypericoides.
