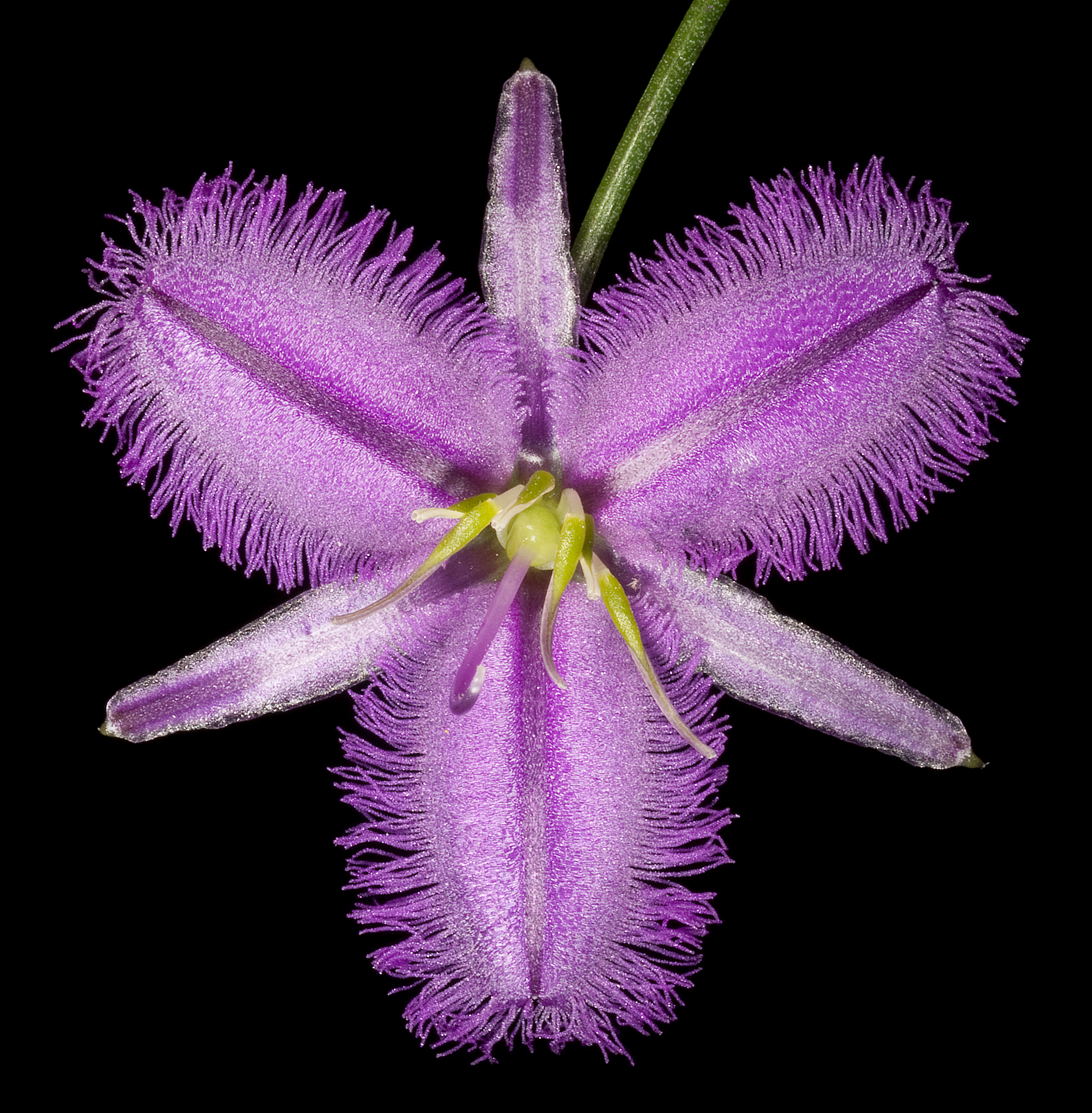

Scientific classification
- Kingdom: Plantae
- Clade: Tracheophytes
- Clade: Angiosperms
- Clade: Monocots
- Order: Asparagales
- Family: Asparagaceae
- Subfamily: Lomandroideae
- Genus: Thysanotus
- Species: T. manglesianus

Binomial name
- Thysanotus manglesianus Kunth

= Thysanotus manglesianus =

Species of plant

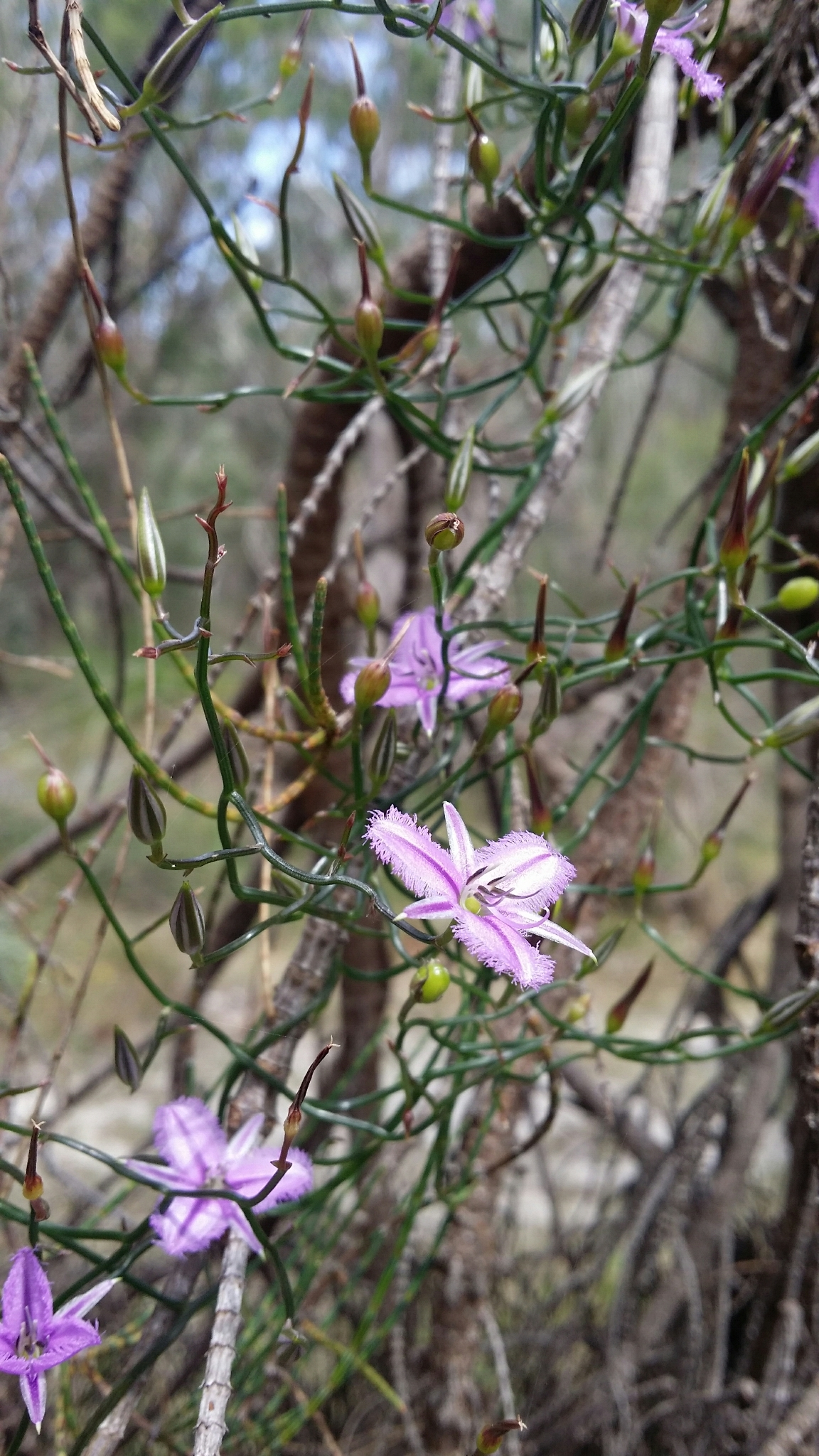
Habit in Kings Park, Western Australia

Thysanotus manglesianus, commonly known as Mangles' fringed lily, is a species of flowering plant in the Asparagaceae family, and is widespread in the Western Australia. It is a twining, more or less leafless, perennial herb with tuberous roots, flowers arranged singly, with linear sepals, elliptic, fringed petals and six stamens.

== Description ==
Thysanotus manglesianus is a twining perennial herb with a small rootstock and tuberous roots. Its leaves are produced infrequently, one or two terete leaves 100–200 mm (3.9–7.9 in) long. The stem is leafless, produced annually, and hairy only at the base, usually 10–100 cm (3.9–39.4 in) long, twining around vegetation or prostrate and usually has many dichotomous branches. The flowers are borne singly on branches on a pedicel 2–5 mm (0.079–0.197 in) long. The flowers are purple, the perianth segments 10.5–16 mm (0.41–0.63 in) long with linear sepals 2.5–3.0 mm (0.098–0.118 in) wide. The petals are elliptic, about 6 mm (0.24 in) wide with a fringe about 2.5 mm (0.098 in) long. There are six stamens, the outer anthers about 4 mm (0.16 in) long, the inner anthers about 6 mm (0.24 in) long and curved. The style is about 7–8 mm (0.28–0.31 in) long. Flowering occurs from August to November and the seeds are more or less spherical, about 1.5 mm (0.059 in) in diameter with a straw-coloured aril.

== Taxonomy ==
Thysanotus manglesianus was first formally described in 1843 by Carl Sigismund Kunth in his Enumeratio Plantarum Omnium Hucusque Cognitarum from specimens collected by James Mangles on the Swan River and by Charles Gaudichaud-Beaupré near Shark Bay. The specific epithet (manglesianus) honours James Mangles.

== Distribution and habitat ==
Mangles' fringed lily grows in sand, loam, laterite or on granite outcrops on sandplain, mallee and forest, and is widespread in the Avon Wheatbelt, Carnarvon, Coolgardie, Esperance Plains, Gascoyne, Geraldton Sandplains, Great Victoria Desert, Jarrah Forest, Little Sandy Desert, Mallee, Murchison, Pilbara, Swan Coastal Plain, Warren and Yalgoo bioregions of Western Australia.
