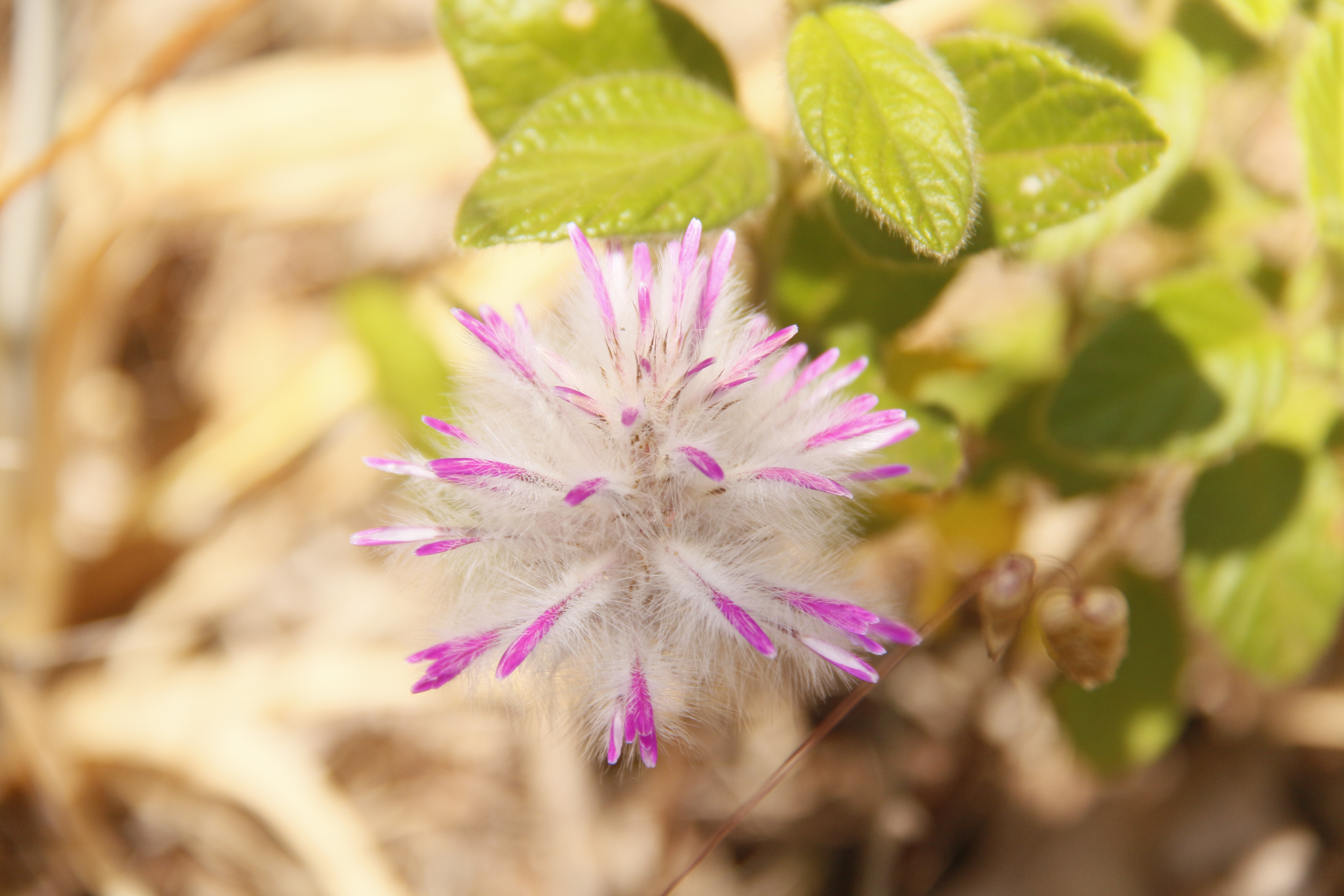
- In John Forrest National Park

Scientific classification
- Kingdom: Plantae
- Clade: Tracheophytes
- Clade: Angiosperms
- Clade: Eudicots
- Order: Caryophyllales
- Family: Amaranthaceae
- Genus: Ptilotus
- Species: P. manglesii

Binomial name
- Ptilotus manglesii (Lindl.) F.Muell.

Synonyms
- Trichinium manglesii Lindl.; Trichinium manglesii var. angustifolium Moq.; Trichinium spectabile Fielding & Gardner; Trichinium macrocephalum auct. non R.Br.: Nees von Esenbeck, C.G.D. in Lehmann, J.G.C. (ed.) (1845)

= Ptilotus manglesii =

Species of grass-like plant

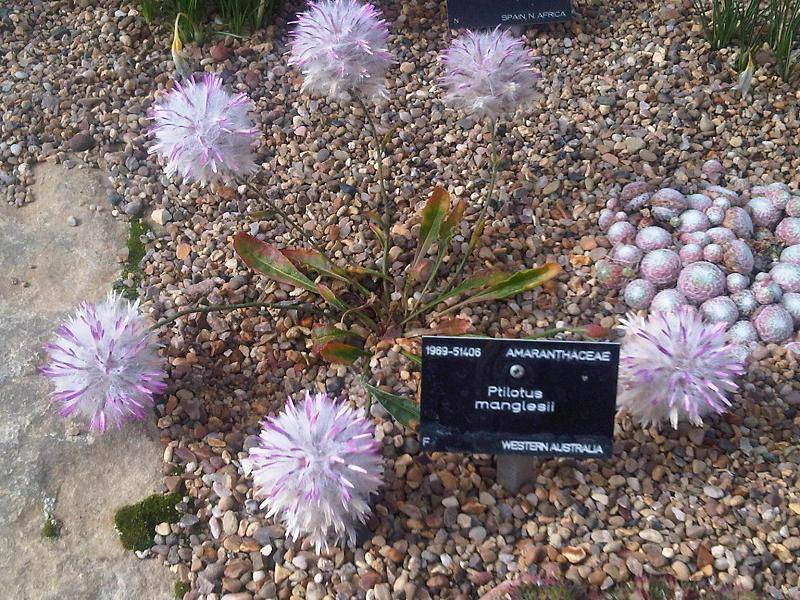
In Kew Gardens

Ptilotus manglesii, commonly known as pom poms, is a species of flowering plant in the family Amaranthaceae and is endemic to the south-west of Western Australia. It is a perennial herb with low-lying, prostrate or rarely erect stems, spatula-shaped to lance-shaped leaves at the base of the plant and lance-shaped to egg-shaped stem leaves, and oval to cylindrical spikes of pink or magenta flowers. The Noongar name for the plant is mulla mulla.

== Description ==
Ptilotus manglesii is a perennial herb 100–400 mm (3.9–15.7 in) high and 150–400 mm (5.9–15.7 in) wide, with terete, low-lying, prostrate or rarely erect stems 70–300 mm (2.8–11.8 in) long. The leaves at the base of the plant are spatula-shaped to lance-shaped with the narrower end towards the base, 40–150 mm (1.6–5.9 in) long and 10–60 mm (0.39–2.36 in) wide, the stem leaves lance-shaped to egg-shaped, 15–70 mm (0.59–2.76 in) long and 5–14 mm (0.20–0.55 in) wide. The flowers are pink or magenta and arranged in oval or cylindrical spikes 25–70 mm (0.98–2.76 in) long and 38–50 mm (1.5–2.0 in) wide. There are egg-shaped to lance-shaped bracts 10–13.5 mm (0.39–0.53 in) long and similar bracteoles 13–15 mm (0.51–0.59 in) long. The outer sepals are lance-shaped 17–28 mm (0.67–1.10 in) long, the inner sepals lance-shaped and more or less downcurved, 15–25 mm (0.59–0.98 in) long. There are three to five stamens and up to two staminodes, the style is curved, 4.0–6.5 mm (0.16–0.26 in) long and fixed to the side of the ovary and the seed is dull brown, about 3.1 mm (0.12 in) long and 1.7 mm (0.067 in) wide. Flowering occurs from September to December or January.

== Taxonomy ==
This species was first described in 1839 by John Lindley who gave it the name Trichinium manglesii in Edwards's Botanical Register, from specimens collected in the Swan River Colony. In 1868, Ferdinand von Mueller transferred the species to Ptilotus as P. manglesii in his Fragmenta Phytographiae Australiae. The specific epithet (manglesii) honours "Caption James Mangles, R.N.".

== Distribution and habitat ==
Pom poms often grows on sandy, gravelly soils and occurs in the Avon Wheatbelt, Esperance Plains, Geraldton Sandplains, Jarrah Forest, Mallee, Swan Coastal Plain and Warren bioregions of south-western Western Australia.

== Conservation status ==
Ptilotus manglesii is listed as "not threatened" by the Government of Western Australia Department of Biodiversity, Conservation and Attractions.
