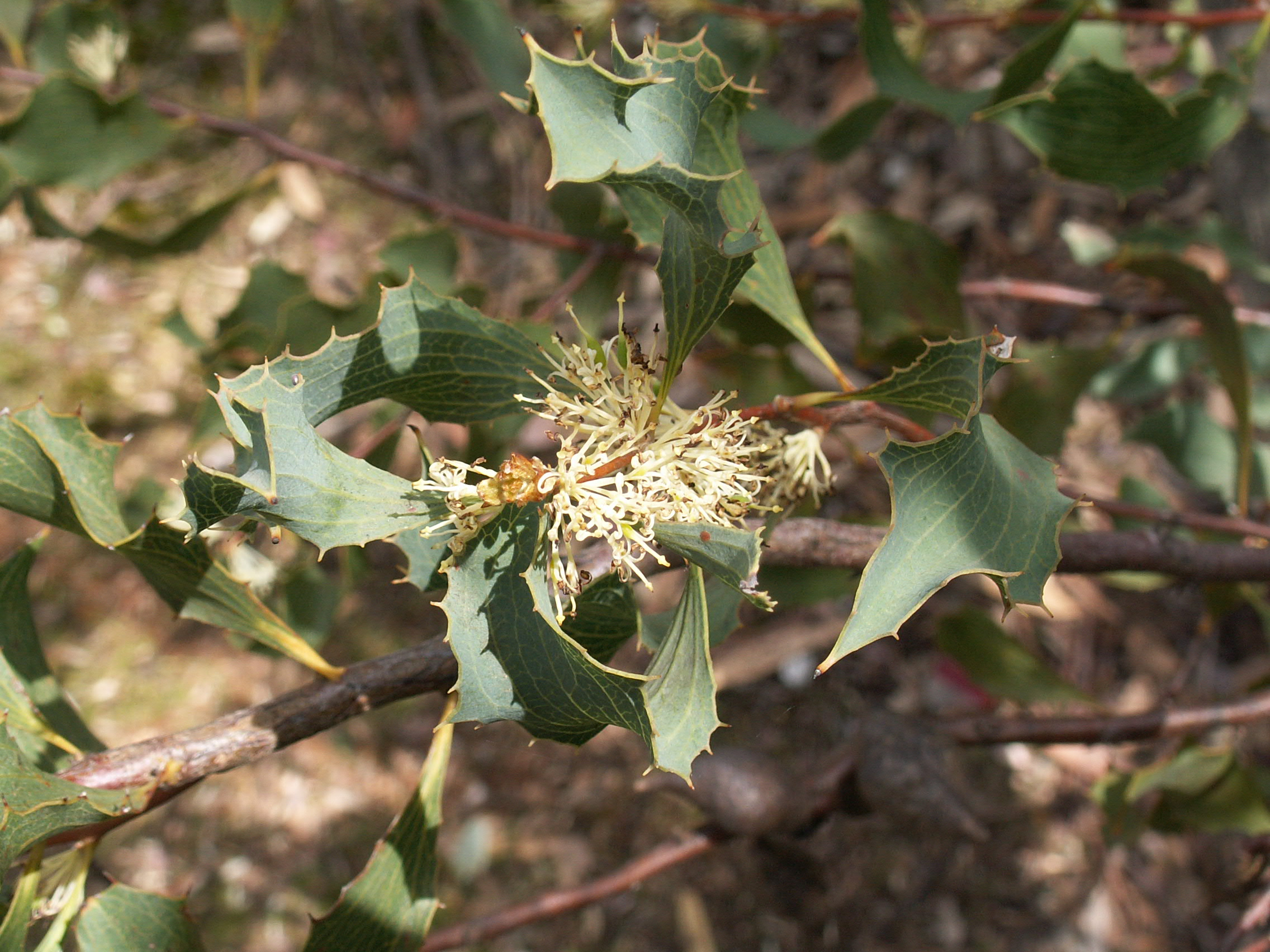
- Hakea undulata growing in John Forrest National Park

Scientific classification
- Kingdom: Plantae
- Clade: Tracheophytes
- Clade: Angiosperms
- Clade: Eudicots
- Order: Proteales
- Family: Proteaceae
- Genus: Hakea
- Species: H. undulata

Binomial name
- Hakea undulata R.Br.

Synonyms
- Anadenia hakeoides Lindl.; Hakea undulata R.Br. var undulata Meisn.; Hakea undulata var. subintegerrima Meisn.

= Hakea undulata =

Species of shrub native to Western Australia

Hakea undulata, commonly known as wavy-leaved hakea, is a flowering plant in the family Proteaceae and is endemic to the south-west of Western Australia. It has stiff wavy leaves and fragrant cream-white flowers from mid-winter to October.

== Description ==
Hakea undulata is an erect and often straggly shrub, growing to between 1–2 m (3–7 ft) high and does not form a lignotuber. The smaller branches are smooth by flowering. The leaves are elliptic to egg-shaped, stiff, prickly, scalloped edges, 4–12 cm (1.6–4.7 in) long, 2–6 cm (0.79–2.36 in) wide. The green-grey leaves have distinctive venation above and below and taper on long stalks to the leaf base. The single inflorescence consist of 12-21 sweetly scented cream-white flowers in a raceme on smooth pedicel. The perianth is cream-white and the pistil 3–4 mm (0.12–0.16 in) long. Fruit are obliquely ovoid 2–3 cm (0.8–1 in) long by 1–2 cm (0.4–0.8 in) wide with smooth slightly rough blister like protrusions on the surface ending with an upturned beak. Flowering occurs from July to October.

== Taxonomy and naming ==
Hakea undulata was first formally described by botanist Robert Brown in Transactions of the Linnean Society of London in 1810. Named from the Latin undulatus 'wavy', referring to the leaf margins.

== Distribution and habitat ==
Wavy-leaved hakea grows from the Darling Ranges north of Perth and south to Albany. This species grows in scrubland and woodland in sand, loam and gravel or with a clay soil over laterite, sometimes on granite. It requires a sunny position with good drainage. A good species for hedging and wildlife habitat.

== Conservation status ==
Hakea undulata is classified as "not threatened" by the Western Australian Government.
