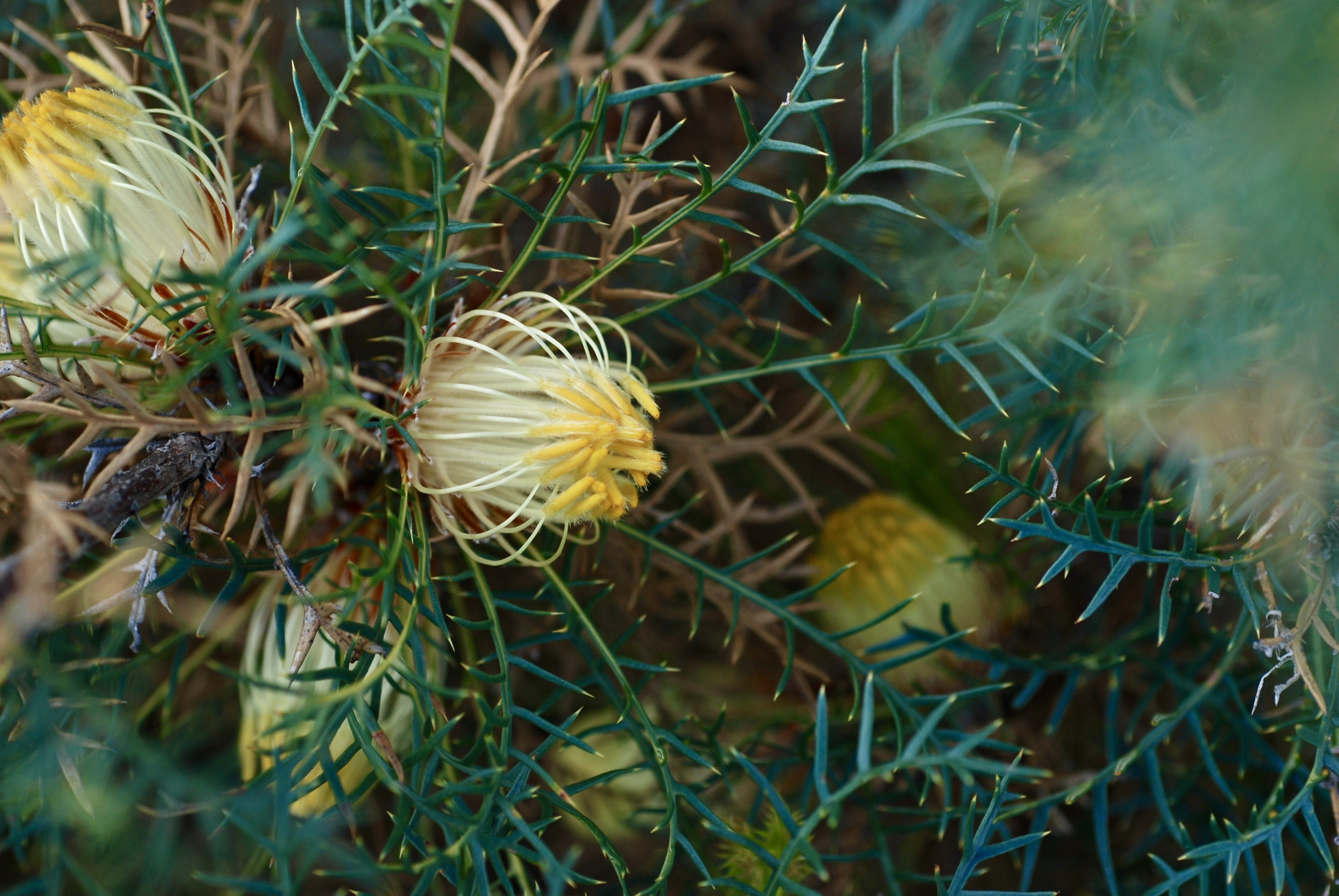
- Banksia recurvistylis near Wandering

Conservation status
- Priority Two — Poorly Known Taxa (DEC)

Scientific classification
- Kingdom: Plantae
- Clade: Tracheophytes
- Clade: Angiosperms
- Clade: Eudicots
- Order: Proteales
- Family: Proteaceae
- Genus: Banksia
- Species: B. recurvistylis

Binomial name
- Banksia recurvistylis K.R.Thiele

Synonyms
- Banksia sp. 'Wandering' (F.&J. Hort 3181)

= Banksia recurvistylis =

Species of shrub endemic to Western Australia

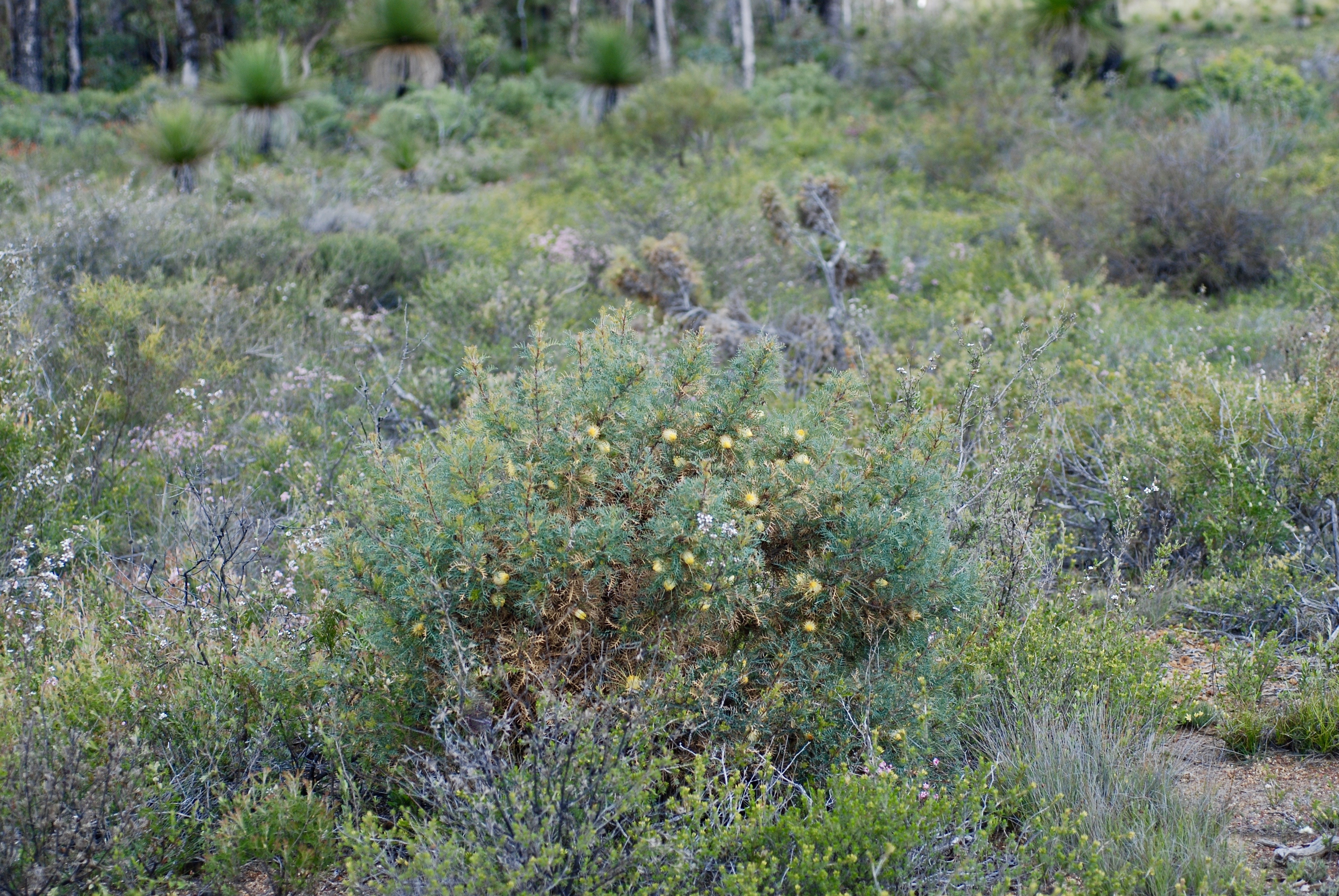
Habit

Banksia recurvistylis is a species of shrub that is endemic to a restricted area of Western Australia. It has densely crowded, deeply serrated pinnate leaves, the lobes very narrow triangular, and heads of between twenty-five and forty pale yellow flowers.

== Description ==
Banksia recurvistylis is a shrub that typically grows to about 2 m (6 ft 7 in) high and 3 m (9.8 ft) wide. The plant has a single stem at its base and does not form a lignotuber. The leaves are densely crowded, 80–110 mm (3.1–4.3 in) long and 22–35 m (72–115 ft) wide and deeply serrated with between ten and fourteen very narrow triangular lobes on each sides, the lobes densely covered with woolly hairs on the lower side. The flowers are arranged in heads of between twenty-five and forty on short side branches. The flowers are pale yellow with the perianth 32–38 mm (1.3–1.5 in) long and the pistil 44–45 mm (1.7–1.8 in) long. Flowering occurs from November to early December and the fruit is a woody, hairy follicle 4–6 mm (0.16–0.24 in) long.

== Taxonomy and naming ==
Banksia recurvistylis was first formally described in 2009 by Kevin Thiele in the journal Nuytsia from specimens collected by Fred Hort in 2008 near Wandering. The specific epithet (recurvistylis) is derived from the Latin words recurvus meaning "curved backwards" and stylus meaning "style", referring to the styles of older flowers.

== Distribution and habitat ==
This banksia grows in or near heath in shallow soil near granite outcrops. It is only known from five populations in the Monadnocks Conservation Park and Wandering Conservation Park.

== Conservation status ==
Banksia recurvistylis is classified as "Priority Two" by the Western Australian Government Department of Parks and Wildlife meaning that it is poorly known and from only one or a few locations.
