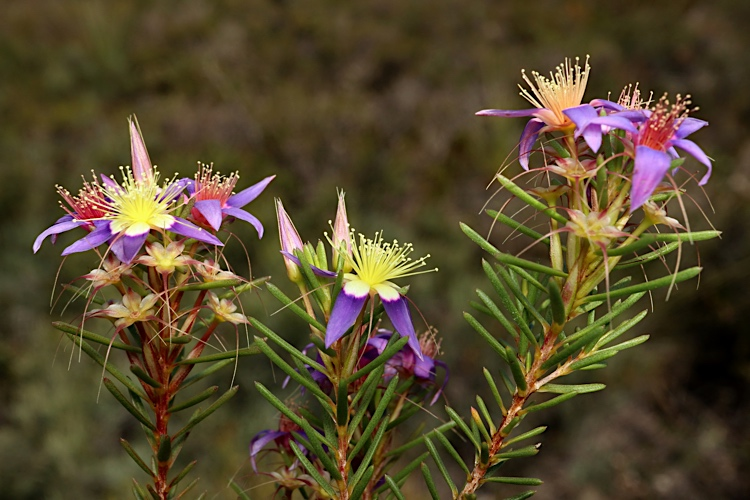
- Near Eneabba
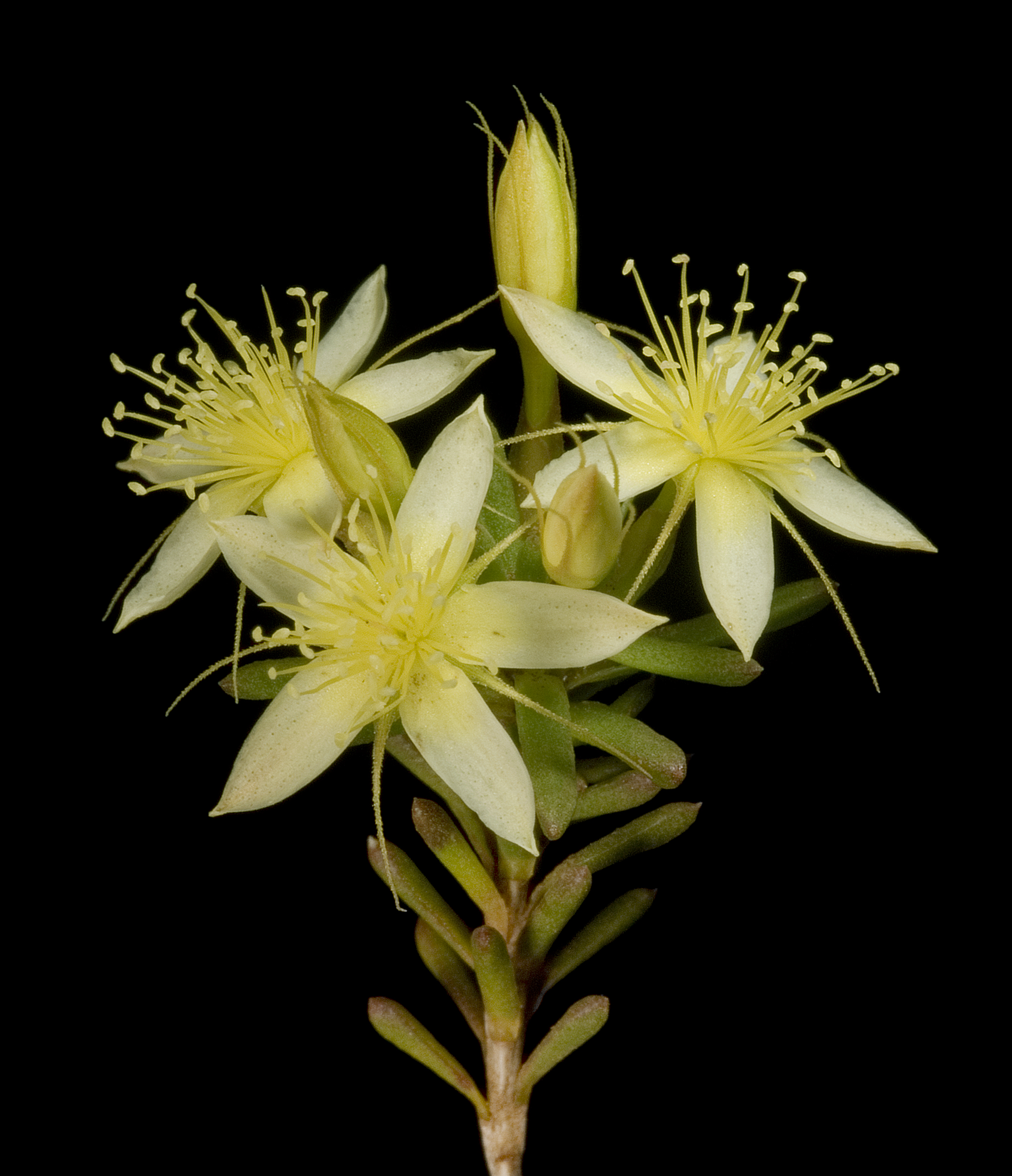
- Yellow form in Kings Park

Scientific classification
- Kingdom: Plantae
- Clade: Tracheophytes
- Clade: Angiosperms
- Clade: Eudicots
- Clade: Rosids
- Order: Myrtales
- Family: Myrtaceae
- Genus: Calytrix
- Species: C. depressa

Binomial name
- Calytrix depressa (Turcz.) Benth.

Synonyms
- List: Calycothrix depressa Turcz.; Calycothrix rosea Meisn. nom. illeg., nom. superfl.; Calycothrix tenuifolia Meisn.; Calythrix depressa Benth. orth. var.; Calythrix stowardii S.Moore orth. var.; Calythrix tenuifolia Benth. orth. var.; Calythrix tenuifolia var. rigidior Benth. orth. var.; Calythrix tenuifolia Benth. var. tenuifolia orth. var.; Calytrix stowardii S.Moore; Calytrix tenuifolia (Meisn.) Benth.; Calytrix tenuifolia var. rigidior Benth.; Calytrix tenuifolia (Meisn.) Benth. var. tenuifolia

= Calytrix depressa =

Species of flowering plant

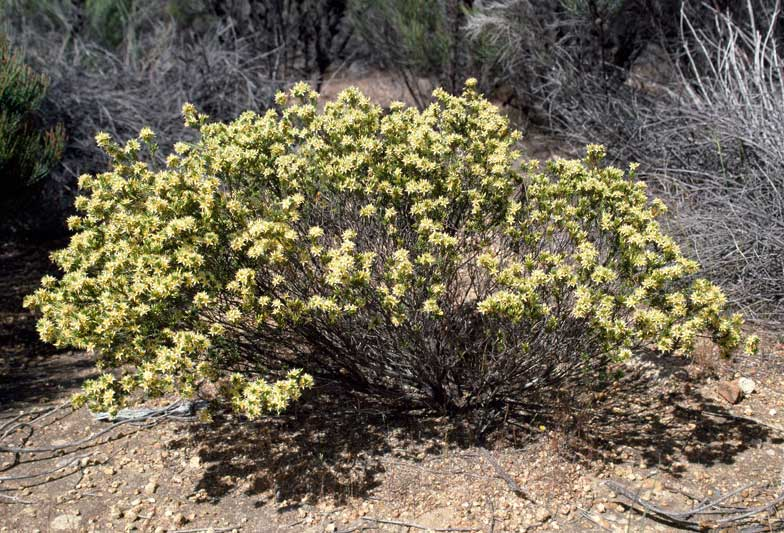
Habit near Wongan Hills

Calytrix depressa is a species of flowering plant in the myrtle family Myrtaceae and is endemic to the south-west of Western Australia. It is a glabrous shrub with linear to lance-shaped leaves and mauve to violet or yellow flowers with 35 to 75 stamens in several rows.

== Description ==
Calytrix depressa is a glabrous shrub that typically grows to a height of up to 0.2–1 m (7.9 in – 3 ft 3.4 in), sometimes up to 2 m (6 ft 7 in). Its leaves are usually linear to lance-shaped, 2–17 mm (0.079–0.669 in) long, 0.6–1.5 mm (0.024–0.059 in) wide, often flattened near the base, and sessile or on a petiole up to 1.25 mm (0.049 in) long. The flowers are borne on a peduncle 1.5–3.5 mm (0.059–0.138 in) long with bracteoles 6.0–9.5 mm (0.24–0.37 in) long but fall off as the flowers open. The floral tube is 6–14 mm (0.24–0.55 in) long and has 10 ribs. The sepals are joined for a short distance at the base, the lobes round to egg-shaped, 1.25–2.5 mm (0.049–0.098 in) long and 1.4–2.75 mm (0.055–0.108 in) wide with an awn up to 12 mm (0.47 in) long. The petals are either mauve to violet and yellow near the base, becoming pinkish to reddish purple as they age, or yellow and not aging to reddish, 5–11 mm (0.20–0.43 in) long and 2.0–4.25 mm (0.079–0.167 in) wide. There are about 35 to 75 yellow stamens 1.5–7.5 mm (0.059–0.295 in) long, sometimes becoming reddish-purple as they age, or else remaining yellow. Flowering usually occurs from September to November.

== Taxonomy ==
This species was first formally described in 1847 by Nikolai Turczaninow who gave it the name Calycothrix depressa in the Bulletin de la Société impériale des naturalistes de Moscou, from specimens collected by James Drummond. In 1867, George Bentham transferred the species to the genus Calytrix as C. depressa in his Flora Australiensis. The specific epithet (depressa) means 'pressed down', referring to the low habit.

== Distribution and habitat ==
Calytrix depressa is found from near Kalbarri to the Darling Range near Perth, and from Perth eastwards to near Bonnie Rock, between Bremer Bay and Hopetoun, with an isolated population near Kalgoorlie. It grows on granite outcrops, hills in heath on sand and in forest in the Avon Wheatbelt, Esperance Plains, Geraldton Sandplains, Jarrah Forest, Mallee, Murchison, Swan Coastal Plain and Yalgoo bioregions of south-western Western Australia.

== Use in horticulture ==
This species requires a moist but well-drained position, with filtered sunlight. The species may be propagated from cuttings or seed, the latter resulting in stronger plants although difficult to germinate. Plants may sometimes be affected by root rot in hot, humid climates, or scale.
