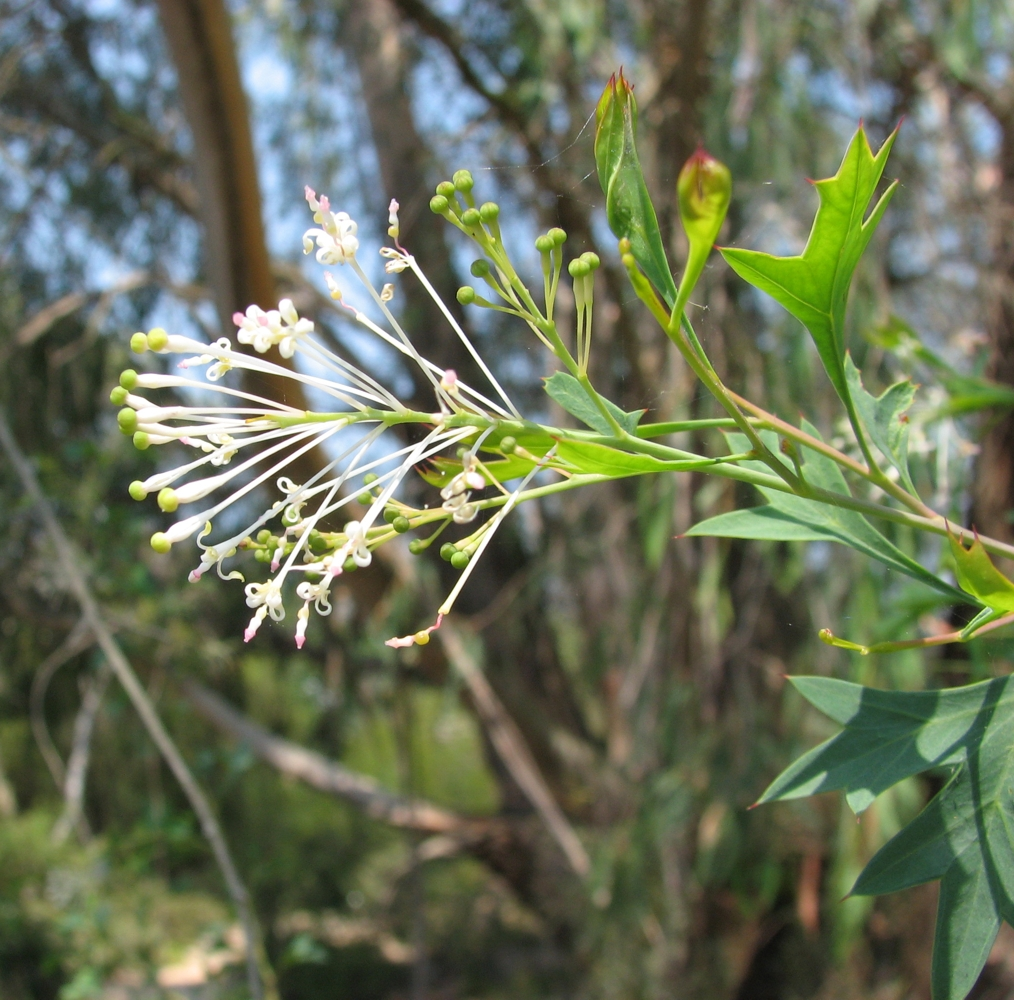

Conservation status
- Least Concern (IUCN 3.1)

Scientific classification
- Kingdom: Plantae
- Clade: Embryophytes
- Clade: Tracheophytes
- Clade: Angiosperms
- Clade: Eudicots
- Order: Proteales
- Family: Proteaceae
- Genus: Grevillea
- Species: G. manglesii

Binomial name
- Grevillea manglesii Pépin

Synonyms
- List: Anadenia manglesii Graham; Grevillea cuneata Druce nom. illeg.; Grevillea glabrata (Lindl.) Meisn.; Grevillea glabrata (Lindl.) Meisn. subsp. glabrata; Grevillea manglesii Endl. nom. inval., nom. nud.; Grevillea manglesii Heynh. nom. inval., nom. nud.; Grevillea manglesii Steud. nom. inval., pro syn.; Grevillea manglesii Meisn. nom. inval., pro syn.; Grevillea manglesii Endl. nom. inval., pro syn.; Grevillea manglesii (Graham) McGill. isonym; Manglesia cuneata Endl. nom. inval., nom. nud.; Manglesia cuneata Endl. ex Steud. nom. illeg., nom. superfl.; Manglesia cuneatum Steud. orth. var.; Manglesia glabrata Lindl.

= Grevillea manglesii =

Species of shrub endemic to Western Australia

Grevillea manglesii is a species of flowering plant in the family Proteaceae and is endemic to an area around Perth in Western Australia. It is a spreading shrub with divided leaves, with triangular or linear lobes, and clusters of cream-coloured or white flowers.

== Description ==
Grevillea manglesii is a spreading shrub that typically grows to 1.5–3 m (4 ft 11 in – 9 ft 10 in) high and up to 3 m (9.8 ft) wide and has long, straight branches. The leaves are 20–80 mm (0.79–3.15 in) long and 10–50 mm (0.39–1.97 in) wide with three lobes, the lobes triangular or linear, sometimes further divided near the tip. The flowers are cream-coloured or white, the pistil 3.3–5.5 mm (0.13–0.22 in) long. Flowering period depends on subspecies, and the fruit is an oblong to oval follicle 7–10 mm (0.28–0.39 in) long.

== Taxonomy ==
Grevillea manglesii was first formally described in 1838 by Pierre Denis Pépin in the journal Annales de flore et de pomone; ou journal des jardins et des champs. The specific epithet (manglesii) honours James Mangles.

The species was later described by Robert Graham who gave it the name Anadenia manglesii in the Edinburgh New Philosophical Journal in 1839.

The names of three subspecies are accepted by the Australian Plant Census:

- Grevillea manglesii subsp. dissectifolia (McGill.) McGill. has leaves 20–45 mm (0.79–1.77 in) long and 20–50 mm (0.79–1.97 in) wide, with three lobes that are further divided, the end lobes linear, 7–29 mm (0.28–1.14 in) long, 1.3–2.8 mm (0.051–0.110 in) wide, and white flowers, sometimes with a pink tinge, from June to November.
- Grevillea manglesii (Graham) Planch. subsp. manglesii has leaves 20–50 mm (0.79–1.97 in) long and 10–40 mm (0.39–1.57 in) wide, usually with three lobes that are sometimes further divided, the end lobes triangular, 3–10 mm (0.12–0.39 in) long, 3–8 mm (0.12–0.31 in) wide, and white to cream-coloured flowers in most months, peaking from June to November.
- Grivillea manglesii subsp. ornithopoda (Meisn.) McGill. has leaves 50–80 mm (2.0–3.1 in) long and 15–35 mm (0.59–1.38 in) wide with three triangular lobes, 6–35 mm (0.24–1.38 in) long, 2–4 mm (0.079–0.157 in) wide, and white to cream-coloured flowers from May to November.

== Distribution and habitat ==
Grevillea manglesii grows on granite outcrops and on roadsides near Perth in the Avon Wheatbelt, Jarrah Forest, Swan Coastal Plain and Warren bioregions of south-western Western Australia.

== Conservation status ==
This grevillea is listed as not threatened by the Government of Western Australia Department of Biodiversity, Conservation and Attractions.

== Use in horticulture ==
This species is hardy in cultivation, including in humid areas and has proved useful as a screening shrub. It will grow in both full sun and part shade and prefers a well-drained situation.
