= James Mangles (Royal Navy officer) =

British Royal Navy officer (1786–1867)

Captain James Mangles FRS FRGS
- Born: 1786
- Died: 18 November 1867 (aged 81); Fairfield, Topsham Road, Exeter
- Military career
- Allegiance: United Kingdom
- Branch: Royal Navy
- Rank: Captain
- Commands: HMS Racoon
- Conflicts: French Revolutionary Wars; Napoleonic Wars; Capture of the Cape of Good Hope; British invasions of the Río de la Plata; Invasion of Martinique
- Awards: Fellow of the Royal Society; Fellow of the Royal Geographical Society

James Mangles FRS FRGS (1786 – 18 November 1867) was an officer of the Royal Navy, naturalist, horticulturalist and writer. He served during the French Revolutionary and Napoleonic Wars, rising to the rank of captain. In the post-war period, with his brothers Robert and George, who shared his interests in horticulture, botany and plant collection, James was actively involved in the botanical, horticultural and commercial life of early colonial Western Australia.

== Life ==
Mangles was the son of John Mangles (1760–1837), brother of James Mangles (1762–1838), the Member of Parliament. He entered the navy in March 1800, on board the frigate Maidstone, with Captain Ross Donnelly, whom in 1801 he followed to Narcissus. After active service on the coast of France, at the reduction of the Cape of Good Hope, and at the British invasions of the Río de la Plata, he was, on 24 September 1806, promoted to be lieutenant of Penelope, in which, in February 1809, he was present at the reduction of Martinique.

In 1811 Mangles was appointed to Boyne, and in 1812 to Ville de Paris, flagship in the English Channel of Sir Harry Burrard Neale. In 1814 he was first lieutenant of Duncan, flagship of Sir John Beresford in his voyage to Rio de Janeiro. He was sent home in acting command of the sloop, Racoon and was confirmed in the rank of commander on 13 June 1815. This was his last service afloat.

In 1816 Mangles left England, with his old messmate in the Narcissus, Captain Charles Leonard Irby, on what proved to be a lengthy tour in Europe, Egypt, Syria, and Asia Minor. They travelled with William John Bankes and Thomas Legh. Mangles was elected a Fellow of the Royal Society in 1825, and in 1830 was co-founder and one of the first fellows and members of council of the Royal Geographical Society.

In 1831 Mangles visited the Swan River Colony in Australia. His cousin Ellen Stirling (née Mangles) was wife of Lieutenant Governor James Stirling. On his return Mangles went into business with his brother Robert, and commissioned James Drummond to collect seeds, plants and herbarium specimens, which they sold to nurserymen. Mangles corresponded with several members of the Swan River Colony regarding matters of a botanical nature. The colonists included Georgiana Molloy, George Fletcher Moore, Captain Richard Goldsmith Meares, Ellen Stirling, James Drummond, Henry Mortlock Ommanney, and Sir Richard Spencer.

The names of several Western Australian plants honour members of the Mangles family, including the floral emblem of the State of Western Australia, Anigozanthos manglesii (the red and green or Mangles kangaroo paw), named for Robert, who grew the specimen from seed in his English garden; and Melaleuca manglesii, Grevillea manglesii, Rhodanthe manglesii and Ptilotus manglesii (pom poms), named for James.

Mangles died at Fairfield, Exeter, on 18 November 1867, aged 81.

== Works ==
The letters of Irby and Mangles were privately printed in 1823, and were published as a volume of John Murray III's Home and Colonial Library in 1844. Mangles was also the author of:

- The Floral Calendar, 1839, a short work on window and town gardening;
- Synopsis of a Complete Dictionary ... of the Illustrated Geographically and Hydrography of England and Wales, Scotland and Ireland, 1848;
- Papers and Despatches relating to the Arctic Searching Expeditions of 1850-1-2, 1852; and
- The Thames Estuary, a Guide to the Navigation of the Thames Mouth, 1853.

== See also ==
- Khirbet edh-Dharih, Nabataean site in today's Jordan, discovered by Irby & Mangles
