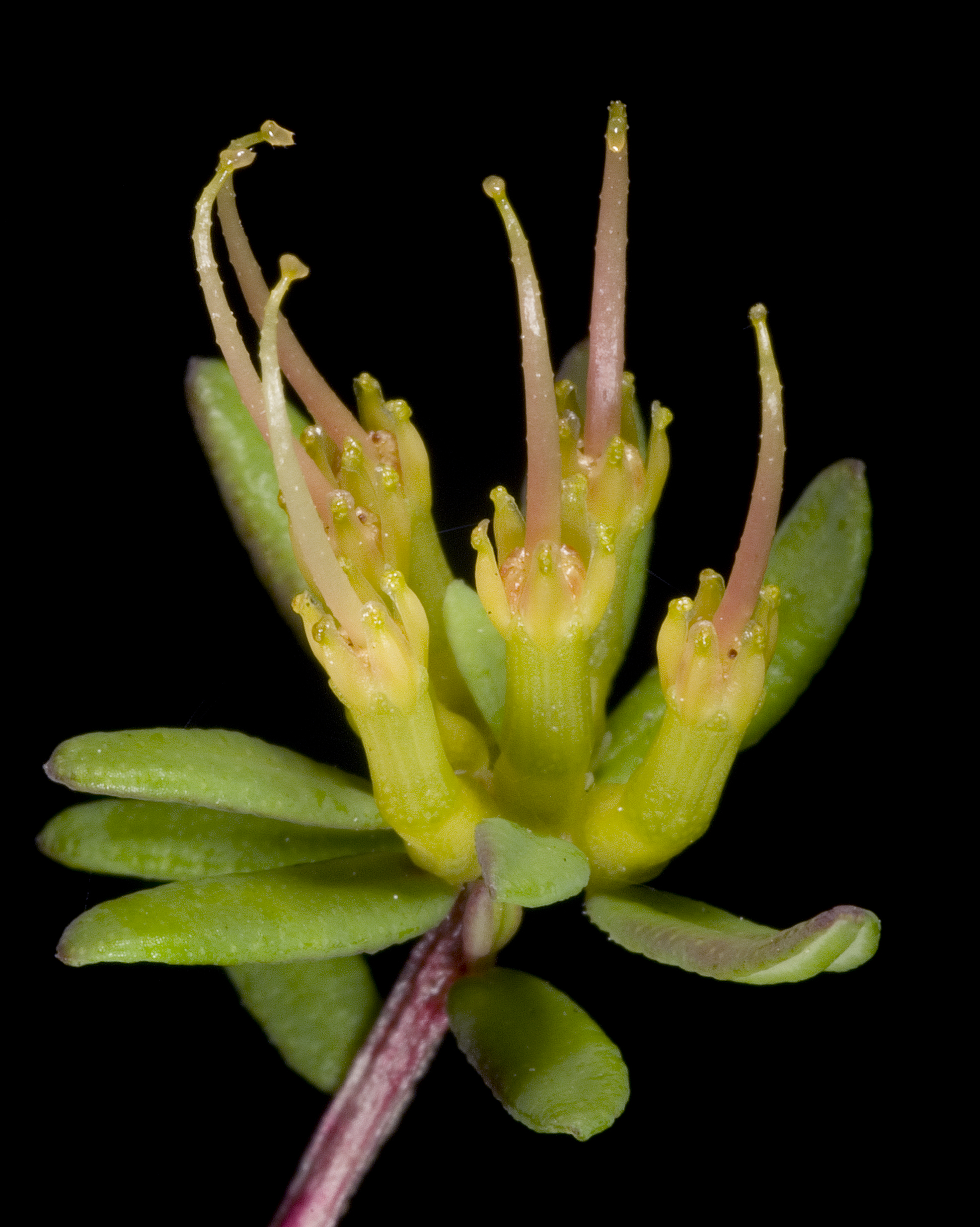

Scientific classification
- Kingdom: Plantae
- Clade: Tracheophytes
- Clade: Angiosperms
- Clade: Eudicots
- Clade: Rosids
- Order: Myrtales
- Family: Myrtaceae
- Genus: Darwinia
- Species: D. thymoides

Binomial name
- Darwinia thymoides (Lindl.) Benth.
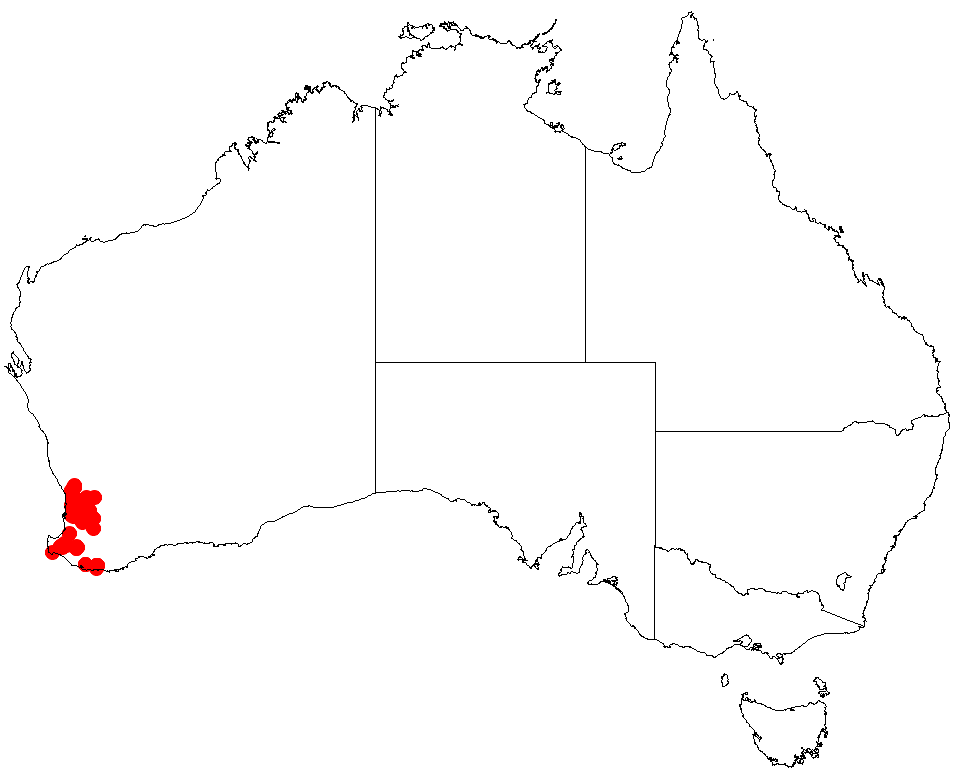
- Occurrence data from AVH

Synonyms
- Darwinia brevistyla Turcz.; Darwinia thymoides (Lindl.) Benth. var. thymoides; Darwinia thymoidis Domin orth. var.; Genetyllis thymoides (Lindl.) Schauer; Hedaroma thymoides Lindl.

= Darwinia thymoides =

Species of flowering plant

Darwinia thymoides is a species of flowering plant in the myrtle family Myrtaceae and is endemic to the south-west of Western Australia. It is a low, spreading to prostrate shrub with linear to lance-shaped leaves and groups of 4 to 8 green, red or white flowers surrounded by leaf-like bracts.

== Description ==
Darwinia thymoides is a low, spreading to prostrate shrub that typically grows to a height of 10–30 centimetres (4–10 in) and often forms mats. Its leaves are mostly arranged in opposite pairs, linear to lance-shaped, 6.0–8.5 mm (0.24–0.33 in) long with the edges rolled under. The flowers are arranged on the ends of branches in sessile groups of 4 to 8, surrounded by leaf-like bracts and short, broad bracteoles that fall off early. The sepals are thin, 4–6 mm (0.16–0.24 in) long and glabrous but with 5 longitudinal ridges and the petals are green, red or white with a curved style that is bearded at first. Flowering mainly occurs in December and January.

== Taxonomy ==
This species was first formally described in 1839 by John Lindley who gave it the name Hedaroma thymoides in A Sketch of the Vegetation of the Swan River Colony. In 1865, George Bentham changed the name to Darwinia thymoides in the Journal of the Linnean Society, Botany. The specific epithet (thymoides) means "thyme-like".

== Distribution and habitat ==
Darwinia thymoides grows on granite outcrops and along creeks in sandy to loam or clay soils in the Avon Wheatbelt, Jarrah Forest, Swan Coastal Plain and Warren bioregions of south-western Western Australia.
