= Pterochaeta =

Pterochaeta is the scientific name of two genera of organisms and may refer to:

- Pterochaeta (moth), a genus of moths in the family Erebidae
- Pterochaeta (plant), a genus of plants in the family Asteraceae
