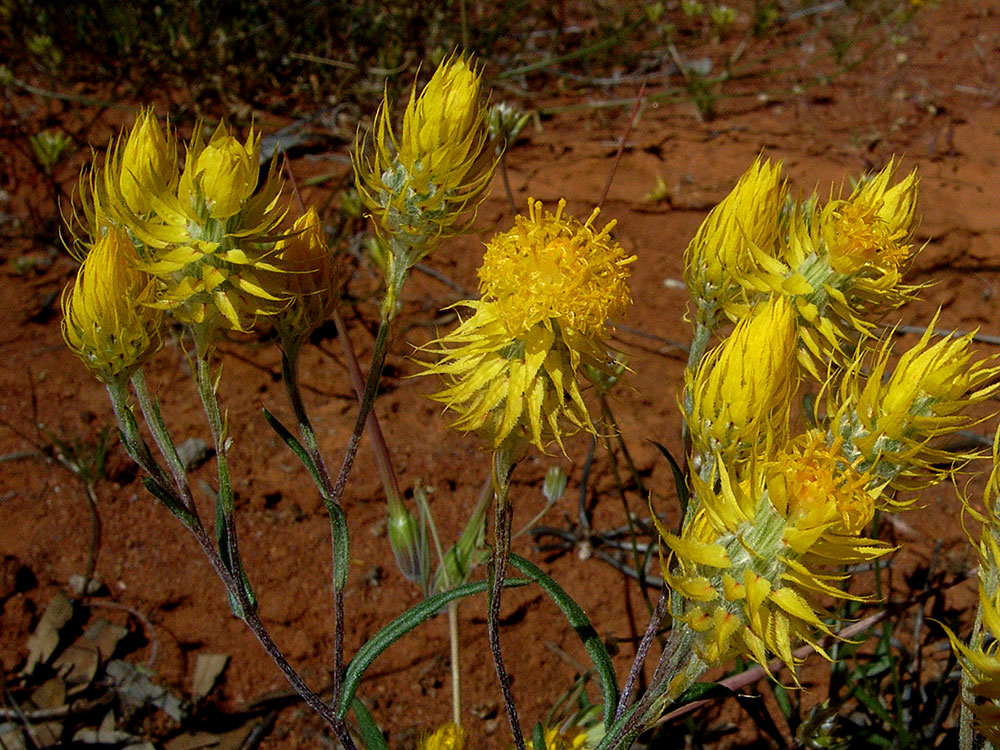
- Waitzia acuminata

Scientific classification
- Kingdom: Plantae
- Clade: Tracheophytes
- Clade: Angiosperms
- Clade: Eudicots
- Clade: Asterids
- Order: Asterales
- Family: Asteraceae
- Subfamily: Asteroideae
- Tribe: Gnaphalieae
- Genus: Waitzia; J.C.Wendl. 1808 not Rchb. 1828 (Iridaceae)

Synonyms
- Helichrysum sect. Waitzia (J.C.Wendl.) Baill.

= Waitzia =

Genus of flowering plants

Waitzia is a genus of Australian plants in the tribe Gnaphalieae within the family Asteraceae. The genus is native to Australia, where it grows in Western Australia, the Northern Territory, New South Wales, Victoria and South Australia.

Species

- Waitzia acuminata Steetz - orange immortelle
- Waitzia corymbosa J.C.Wendl.
- Waitzia nitida (Lindl.) Paul G.Wilson - golden waitzia
- Waitzia podolepis (Gaudich.) Benth.
- Waitzia suaveolens (Benth.) Druce - fragrant waitzia

formerly included

see Haptotrichion, Pterochaeta & Rhodanthe

- Waitzia citrina - Rhodanthe citrina
- Waitzia conica - Haptotrichion conicum
- Waitzia paniculata - Pterochaeta paniculata
- Waitzia steetziana - Rhodanthe citrina
