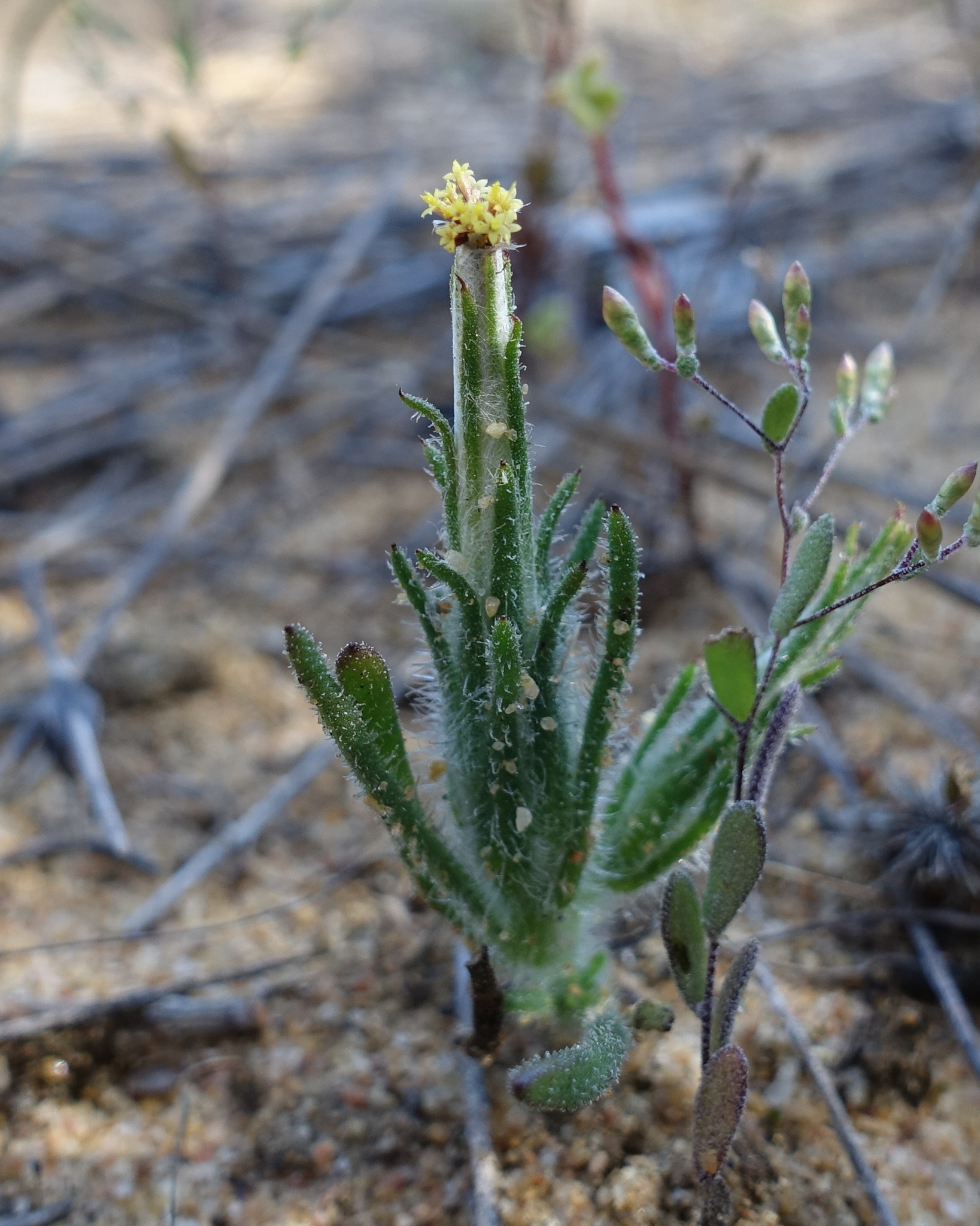

Scientific classification
- Kingdom: Plantae
- Clade: Tracheophytes
- Clade: Angiosperms
- Clade: Eudicots
- Clade: Asterids
- Order: Asterales
- Family: Asteraceae
- Genus: Podotheca
- Species: P. angustifolia

Binomial name
- Podotheca angustifolia (Labill.) Less.
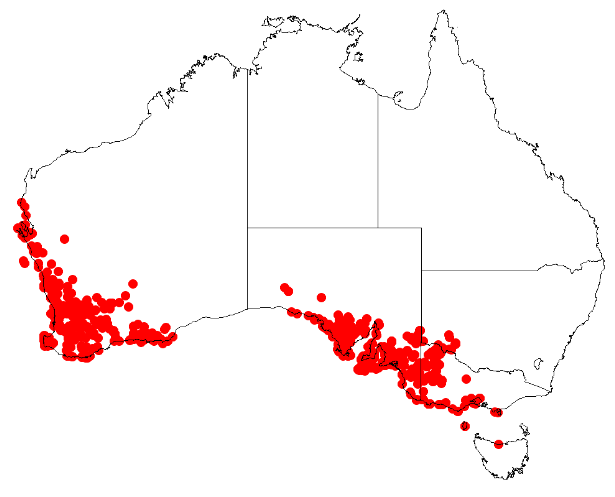
- Occurrence data from AVH

Synonyms
- Lophoclinium manglesii Endl. Phaenopoda angustifolia Cass. Podosperma angustifolium Labill.

= Podotheca angustifolia =

Species of plant

Podotheca angustifolia, commonly known as sticky longheads, is a species of herb native to Australia.

== Description ==
An annual herb with yellow flowers, P. angustifolia grows in a range of habits, from trailing along the ground to erect; when erect if can reach up to 30 centimetres in height, but is usually no more than 20 centimetres. It has a swollen, almost succulent stem, and a slender woody taproot. It is sticky due to secretions from its glandular hairs.

== Taxonomy ==
This species was first published by Jacques Labillardière in his 1806 Novae Hollandiae plantarum specimen, under the name Podosperma angustifolia. In 1826, Alexandre Henri Gabriel de Cassini transferred it into Phaenopoda, but this was overturned six years later by Christian Friedrich Lessing, who placed it in Podotheca.

== Distribution and habitat ==
It occurs in southern parts of Australia. It has been recorded from Tasmania but is now presumed extinct there.
