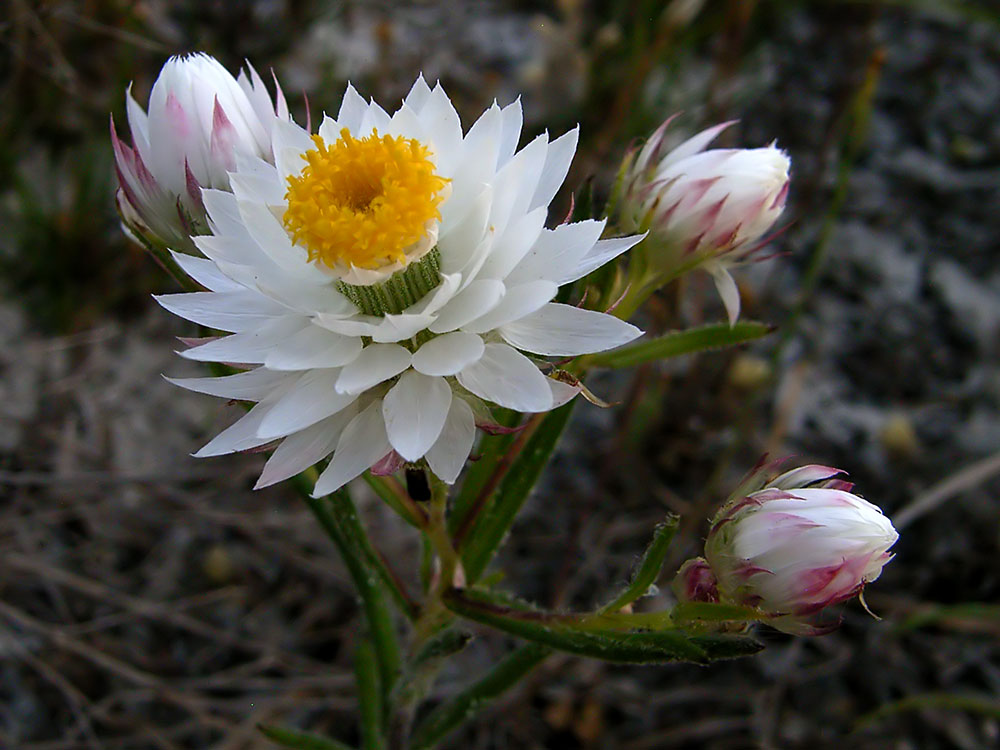

Scientific classification
- Kingdom: Plantae
- Clade: Tracheophytes
- Clade: Angiosperms
- Clade: Eudicots
- Clade: Asterids
- Order: Asterales
- Family: Asteraceae
- Genus: Waitzia
- Species: W. suaveolens

Binomial name
- Waitzia suaveolens (Benth.) Druce

= Waitzia suaveolens =

Species of plant

Waitzia suaveolens, commonly known as fragrant waitzia, is an annual herb in the family Asteraceae. It is endemic to the south-west of Western Australia. Plants grows to 0.6 metres in height and flower between September and January.

The species was first formally described in 1837 and named Leptorhynchus suaveolens by English botanist George Bentham based on plant material collected from the Swan River region. It was subsequently placed in the genus Waitzia in 1917.

Two varieties are currently recognised:

- Waitzia suaveolens var. flava Paul G.Wilson
- Waitzia suaveolens (Benth.) Druce var. suaveolens
