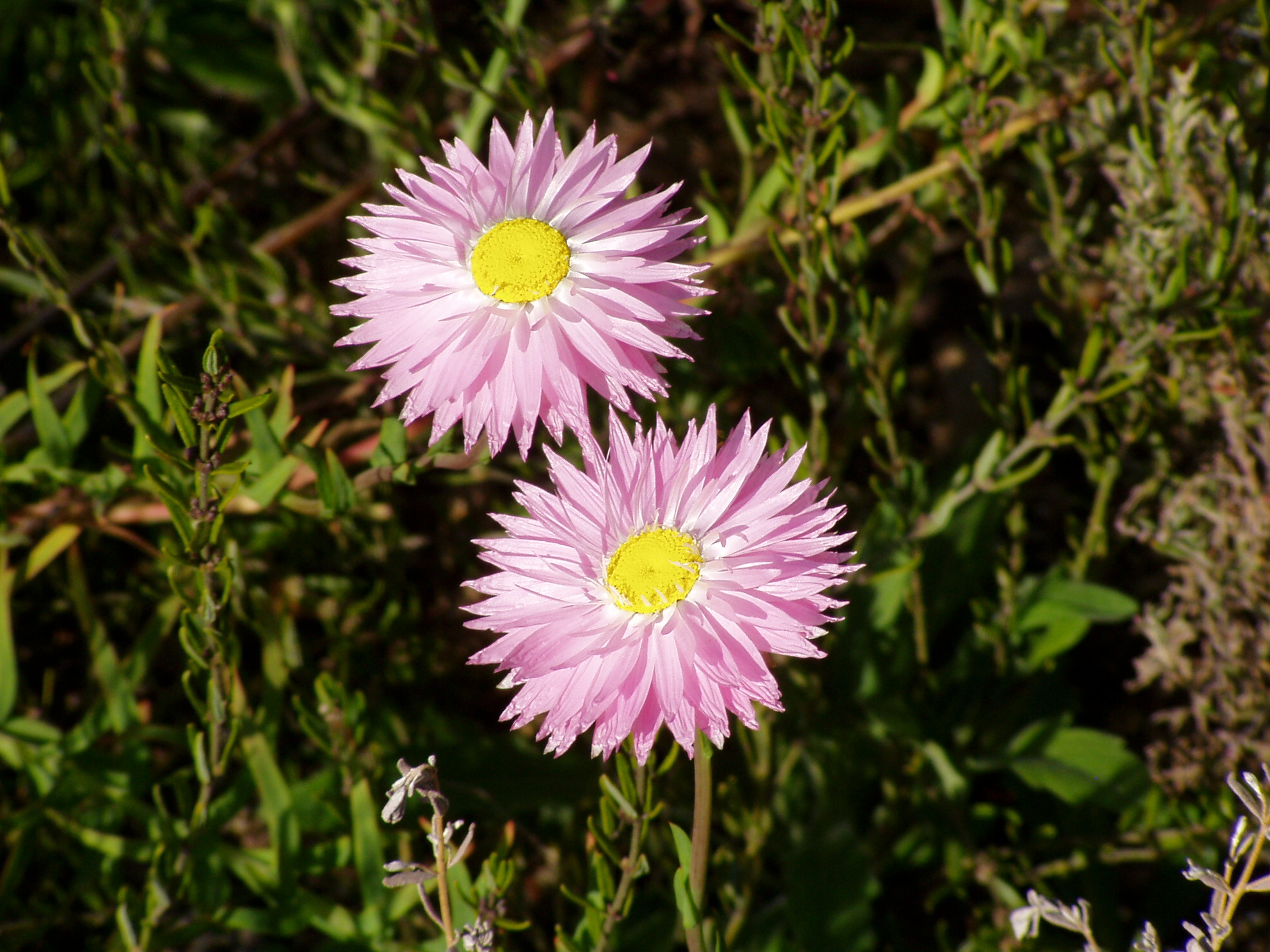

Scientific classification
- Kingdom: Plantae
- Clade: Embryophytes
- Clade: Tracheophytes
- Clade: Spermatophytes
- Clade: Angiosperms
- Clade: Eudicots
- Clade: Asterids
- Order: Asterales
- Family: Asteraceae
- Genus: Rhodanthe
- Species: R. chlorocephala

Binomial name
- Rhodanthe chlorocephala (Turcz.) Paul G.Wilson

= Rhodanthe chlorocephala =

Pink and white everlasting

Species of plant

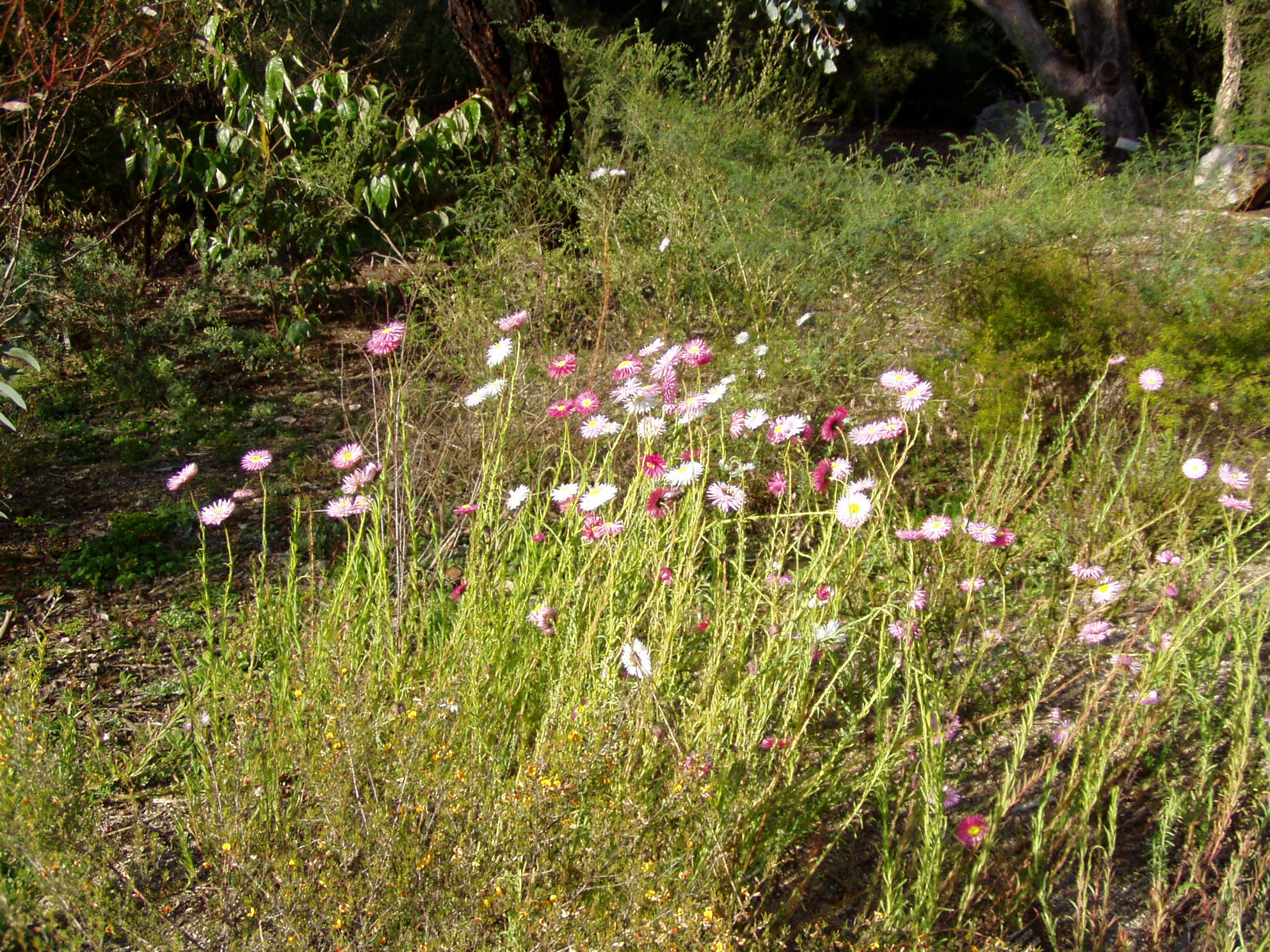
Habit

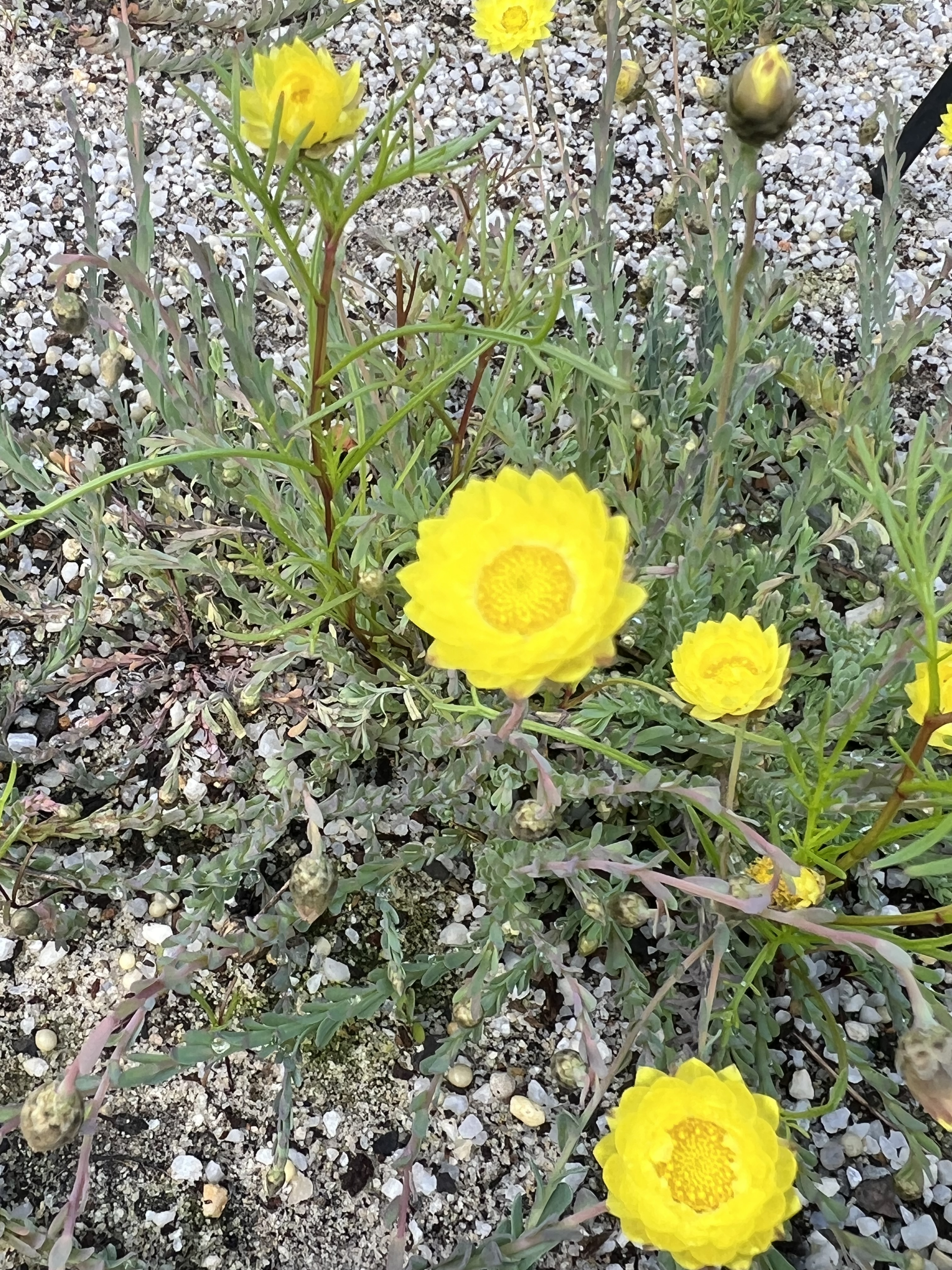
Rhodanthe chlorocephala subsp chlorocephala

Rhodanthe chlorocephala commonly known as pink and white everlasting, is a flowering plant in the family Asteraceae. It is a small, tufted plant with blue-green leaves, white, pink or yellow flowers and grows in Western Australia and South Australia.

== Description ==
Rhodanthe chlorocephala is a small annual with terminal, single flowers about 10–60 mm (0.39–2.36 in) in diameter borne on stems about 30 cm (12 in) long, greenish or yellow florets, papery pink, yellow, cream or white bracts and buds with green outer bracts. The leaves are linear-shaped, blue-green, hairless, 1–2 cm (0.39–0.79 in) long on stems rising from the base of the plant. Flowering mostly occurs from June to November.

== Taxonomy and naming ==
This species was described in 1851 by Nicolai Turczaninow as Schoenia chlorocephala. In 1992 Paul G. Wilson changed the name to Rhodanthe chlorocephala and published in Nuytsia. The specific epithet chlorocephala means "green headed".

== Subtaxa ==
The following subspecies are accepted:

- Rhodanthe chlorocephala subsp. chlorocephala
- Rhodanthe chlorocephala subsp. rosea (Hook.) Paul G.Wilson (syn. Helipterum roseum)
- Rhodanthe chlorocephala subsp. splendida (Hemsl.) Paul G.Wilson

== Distribution and habitat ==
Pink and white everlasting grows in eucalypt woodland, wet areas, salt lakes, sand, clay and loam in Western Australia and South Australia.
