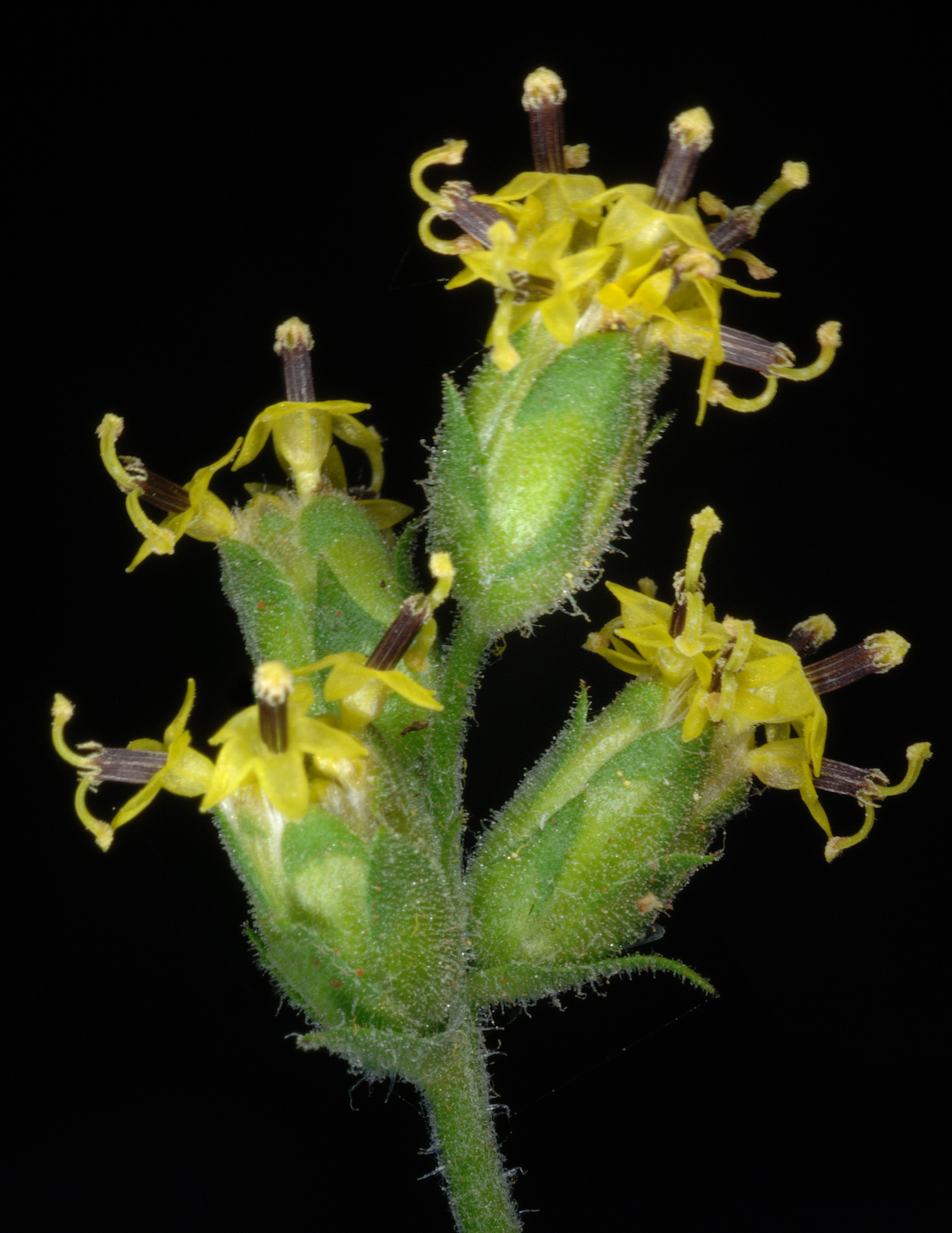

Scientific classification
- Kingdom: Plantae
- Clade: Tracheophytes
- Clade: Angiosperms
- Clade: Eudicots
- Clade: Asterids
- Order: Asterales
- Family: Asteraceae
- Genus: Rhodanthe
- Species: R. battii

Binomial name
- Rhodanthe battii (F.Muell.) Paul G.Wilson

Synonyms
- Helipterum battii F.Muell.

= Rhodanthe battii =

Species of plant

Rhodanthe battii is a species of flowering plant in the family Asteraceae, native to Western Australia.

It was first described by Ferdinand von Mueller in 1893 as Helipterum battii, but, in 1992 Paul Graham Wilson transferred it to the new genus, Rhodanthe.
