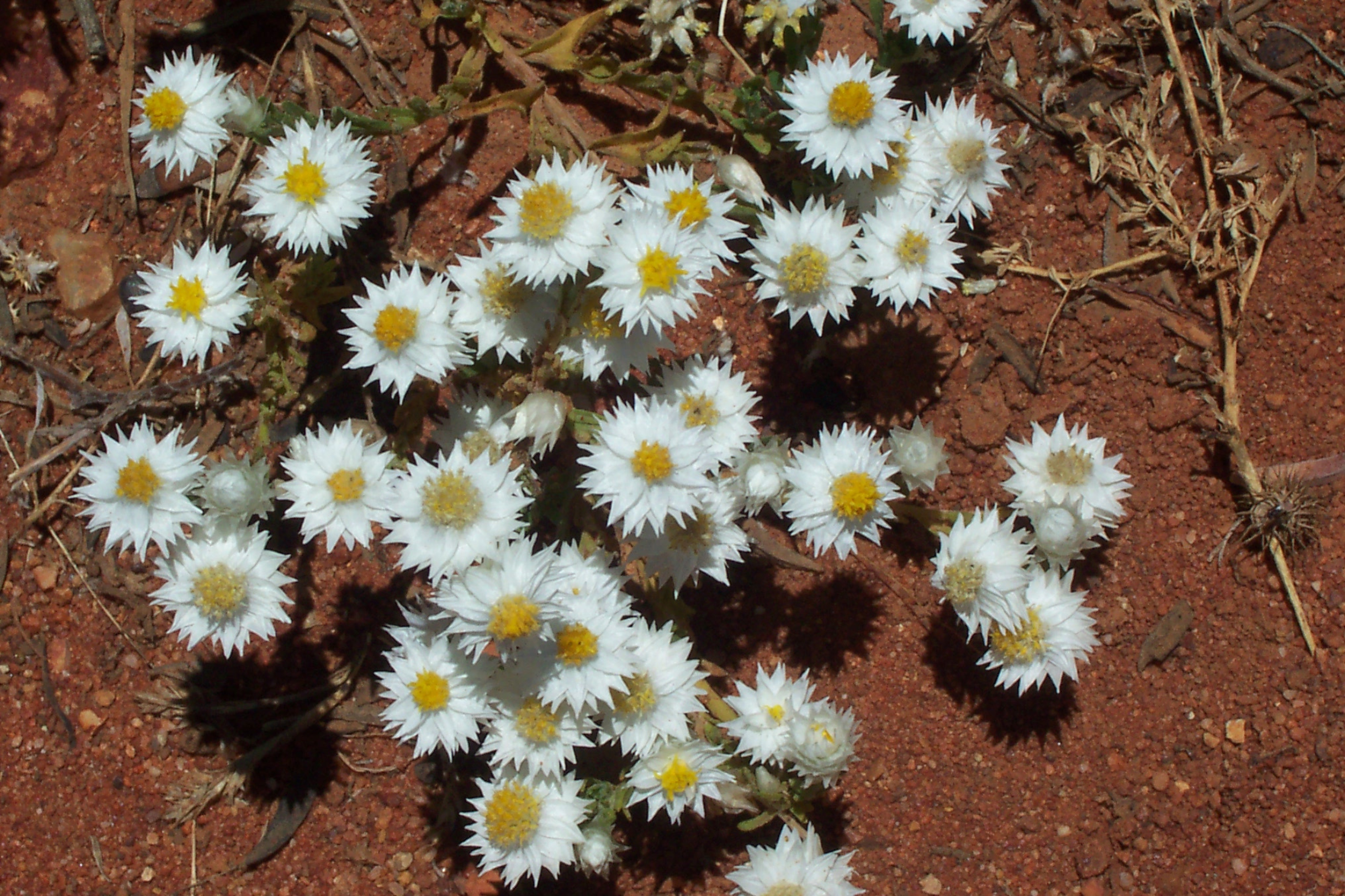
- growing near Mount Oxley, Australia

Scientific classification
- Kingdom: Plantae
- Clade: Tracheophytes
- Clade: Angiosperms
- Clade: Eudicots
- Clade: Asterids
- Order: Asterales
- Family: Asteraceae
- Genus: Rhodanthe
- Species: R. floribunda

Binomial name
- Rhodanthe floribunda (DC.) Paul G.Wilson

Synonyms
- Helipterum floribundum DC.

= Rhodanthe floribunda =

Common white sunray

Species of plant

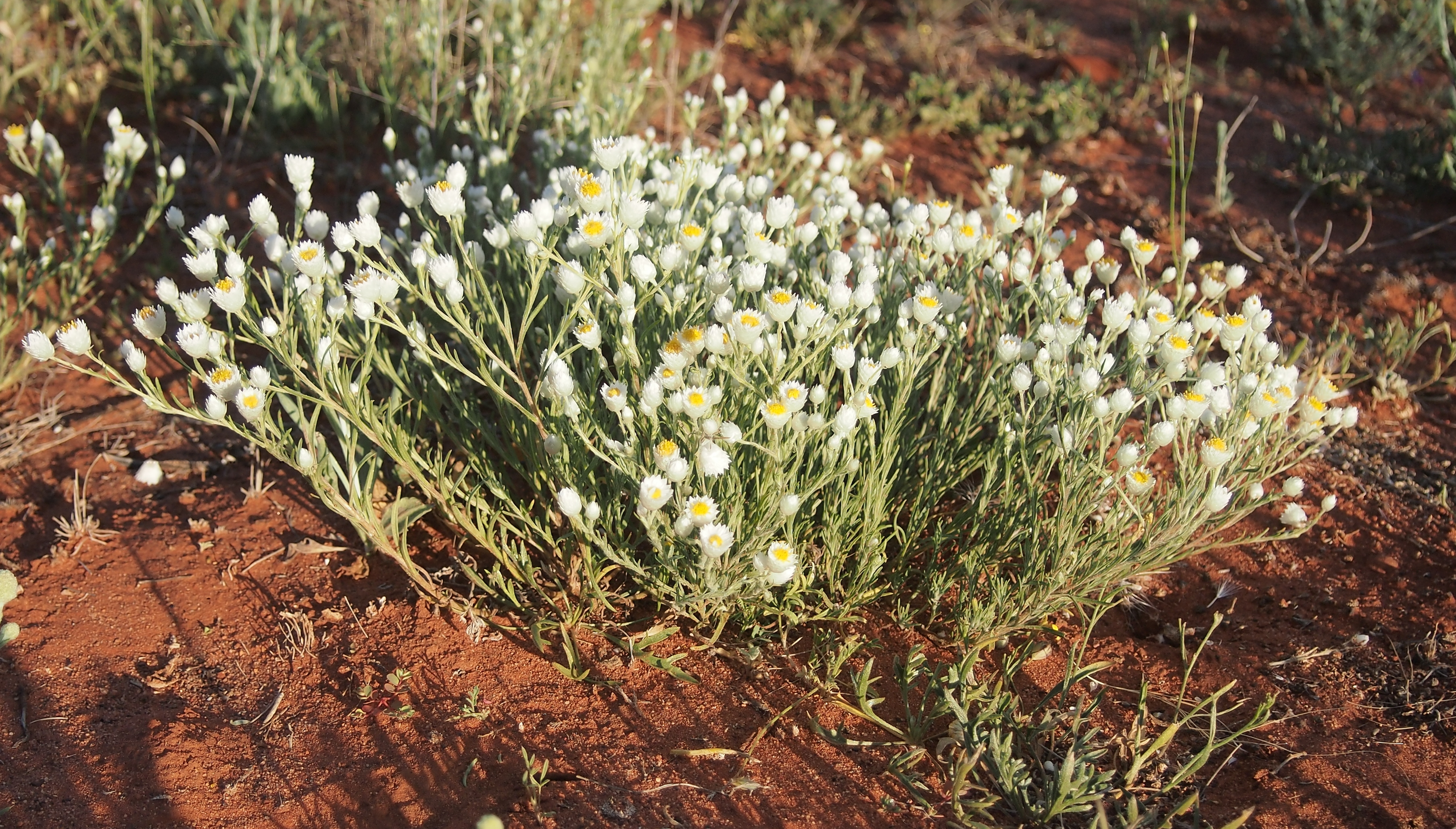
Habit

Rhodanthe floribunda, commonly known as common white sunray, is a flowering, herbaceous plant in the family Asteraceae. It is a small, upright or decumbent plant with white flowers, yellow florets and is endemic to Australia.

== Description ==
Rhodanthe floribunda is an upright or ascending, bushy annual to 30 cm (12 in) high with woolly or almost smooth stems arising from the base. The leaves are sessile, narrow, linear, greyish-green, 10–20 mm (0.39–0.79 in) long, 0.5–2 mm (0.020–0.079 in) wide and the apex rounded. The flower heads are 1–2 cm (0.39–0.79 in) in diameter, borne singly at the end of leafy branchlets. The bracts are arranged in several rows, white, dry, pointed, mostly upright or the inner bracts spreading, corolla about 5 mm (0.20 in) long, toothed and the 20-50 florets yellow. Flowering occurs from August to January but mostly in spring and the fruit is a rounded achene about 3 mm (0.12 in) long and covered with soft, silky, weak hairs.

== Taxonomy and naming ==
This species was first described as Helipterum florabundum in 1838 by Augustin Pyramus de Candolle from an unpublished description by Allan Cunningham. In 1992 Paul G. Wilson changed the name to Rhodanthe floribunda and the description was published in Nuytsia. The specific epithet (floribunda) means "flowering profusely".

== Distribution and habitat ==
Common white sunray grows in semi-arid locations on a variety of soil types including sand and clay in New South Wales, Victoria, Queensland, Western Australia, South Australia and the Northern Territory.
