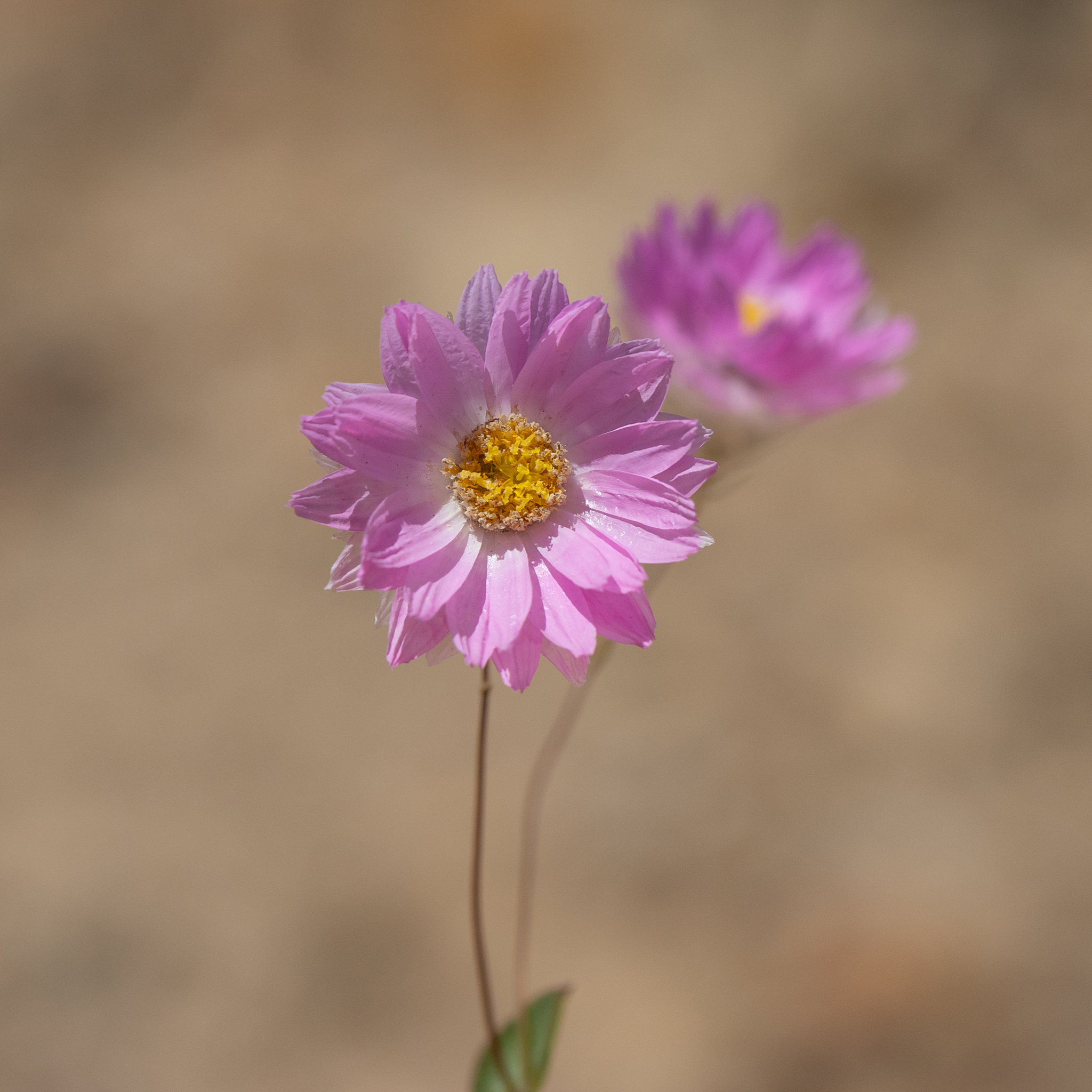
- Rhodanthe manglesii at North Stirlings, Western Australia

Scientific classification
- Kingdom: Plantae
- Clade: Embryophytes
- Clade: Tracheophytes
- Clade: Spermatophytes
- Clade: Angiosperms
- Clade: Eudicots
- Clade: Asterids
- Order: Asterales
- Family: Asteraceae
- Subfamily: Asteroideae
- Tribe: Gnaphalieae
- Genus: Rhodanthe; Lindl.

Type species
- Rhodanthe manglesii Lindl.

Synonyms
- Acroclinium A.Gray; Anisolepis Steetz; Xyridanthe Lindl.; Roccardia Neck. ex Voss; Griffithia J.M.Black; Pteropogon A.Cunn. ex DC.; Helichrysum sect. Rhodanthe (Lindl.) Baill.

= Rhodanthe =

Genus of Australian plants

Rhodanthe (/roʊˈdænθi/ rho-DAN-thee), also known as sunray or pink paper daisy, is a genus of Australian plants in the tribe Gnaphalieae within the family Asteraceae.

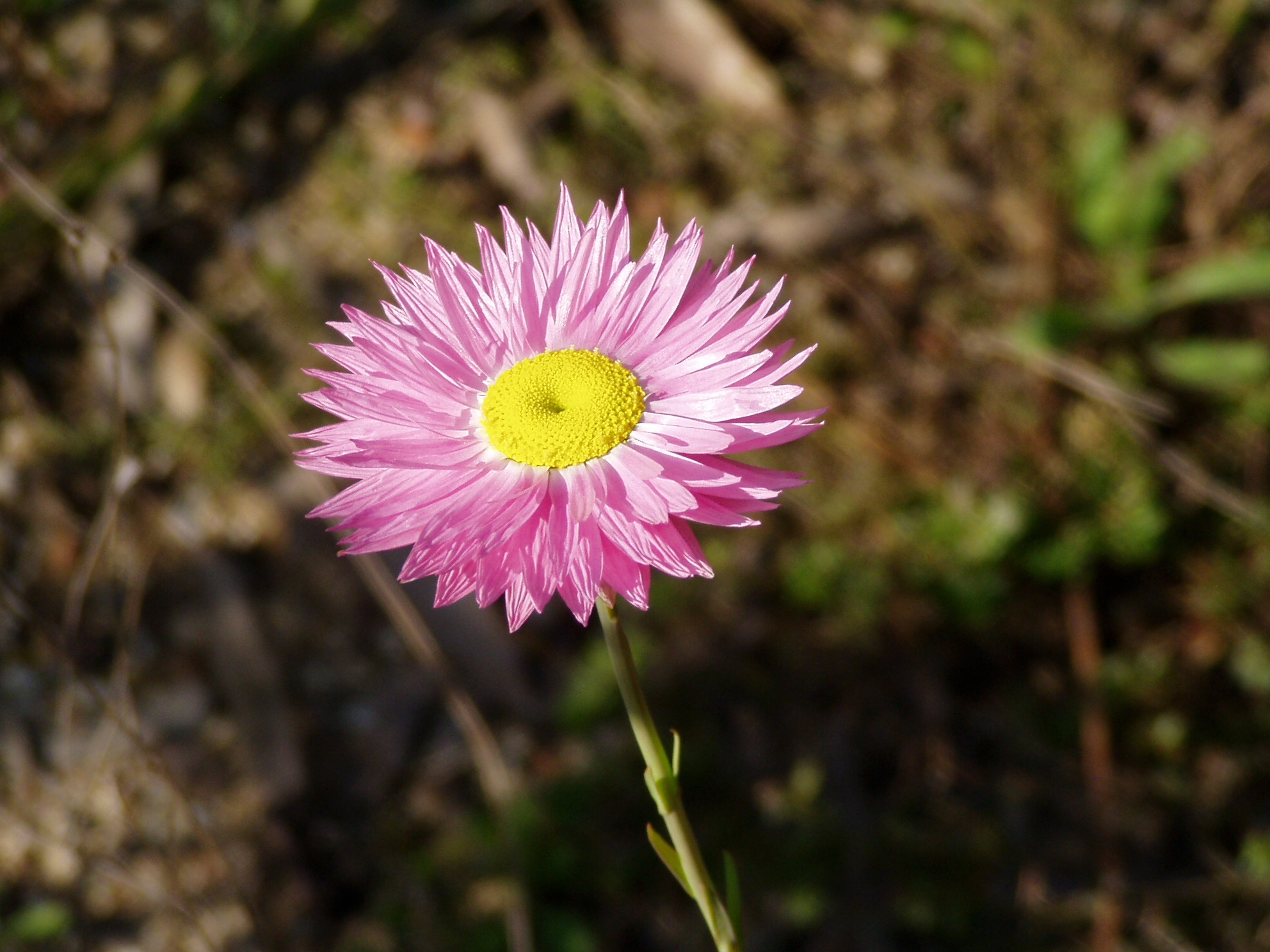
R. chlorocephala subsp. rosea

The name Rhodanthe is derived from Greek rhodon, rose and anthos, flower.

Many Rhodanthe species were formerly classed under different genera, including Helipterum, Podotheca, Acroclinium and Waitzia.

Species

- Rhodanthe anthemoides (Sieber ex Spreng.) Paul G.Wilson
- Rhodanthe ascendens Paul G.Wilson
- Rhodanthe battii (F.Muell.) Paul G.Wilson
- Rhodanthe charsleyae (F.Muell.) Paul G.Wilson
- Rhodanthe chlorocephala (Turcz.) Paul G.Wilson
- Rhodanthe citrina (Benth.) Paul G.Wilson
- Rhodanthe collina Paul G.Wilson
- Rhodanthe condensata (F.Muell.) Paul G.Wilson
- Rhodanthe corymbiflora (Schltdl.) Paul G.Wilson
- Rhodanthe corymbosa (A.Gray) Paul G.Wilson
- Rhodanthe cremea Paul G.Wilson
- Rhodanthe diffusa (A.Cunn. ex DC.) Paul G.Wilson
- Rhodanthe floribunda (DC.) Paul G.Wilson
- Rhodanthe forrestii (F.Muell.) Paul G.Wilson
- Rhodanthe frenchii (F.Muell.) Paul G.Wilson
- Rhodanthe fuscescens (Turcz.) Paul G.Wilson
- Rhodanthe gossypina Paul G.Wilson
- Rhodanthe haigii (F.Muell.) Paul G.Wilson
- Rhodanthe heterantha (Turcz.) Paul G.Wilson
- Rhodanthe humboldtiana (Gaudich.) Paul G.Wilson
- Rhodanthe laevis (A.Gray) Paul G.Wilson
- Rhodanthe manglesii Lindl.
- Rhodanthe maryonii (S.Moore) Paul G.Wilson
- Rhodanthe microglossa (Maiden & Betche) Paul G.Wilson
- Rhodanthe moschata (A.Cunn. ex DC.) Paul G.Wilson
- Rhodanthe nullarborensis Paul G.Wilson
- Rhodanthe oppositifolia (S.Moore) Paul G.Wilson
- Rhodanthe pollackii (F.Muell.) Paul G.Wilson
- Rhodanthe polycephala (A.Gray) Paul G.Wilson
- Rhodanthe polygalifolia (DC.) Paul G.Wilson
- Rhodanthe polyphylla (F.Muell.) Paul G.Wilson
- Rhodanthe propinqua (W.Fitzg.) Paul G.Wilson
- Rhodanthe psammophila Paul G.Wilson
- Rhodanthe pygmaea (DC.) Paul G.Wilson
- Rhodanthe rubella (A.Gray) Paul G.Wilson
- Rhodanthe rufescens Paul G.Wilson
- Rhodanthe sphaerocephala Paul G.Wilson
- Rhodanthe spicata (Steetz) Paul G.Wilson
- Rhodanthe sterilescens (F.Muell.) Paul G.Wilson
- Rhodanthe stricta (Lindl.) Paul G.Wilson
- Rhodanthe stuartiana (Sond. & F.Muell.) Paul G.Wilson
- Rhodanthe tietkensii (F.Muell.) Paul G.Wilson
- Rhodanthe troedelii (F.Muell.) Paul G.Wilson
- Rhodanthe uniflora (J.M.Black) Paul G.Wilson
