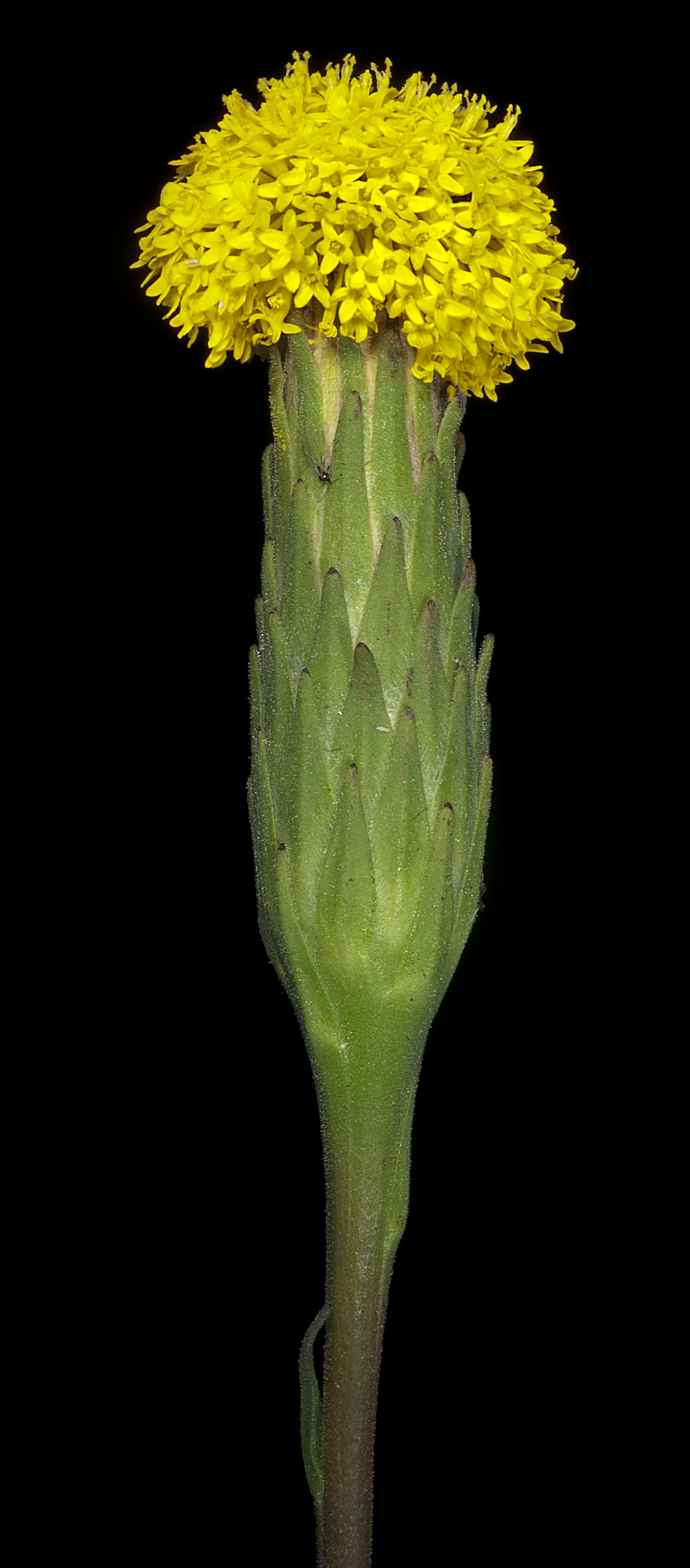

Scientific classification
- Kingdom: Plantae
- Clade: Tracheophytes
- Clade: Angiosperms
- Clade: Eudicots
- Clade: Asterids
- Order: Asterales
- Family: Asteraceae
- Genus: Podotheca
- Species: P. gnaphalioides

Binomial name
- Podotheca gnaphalioides Graham
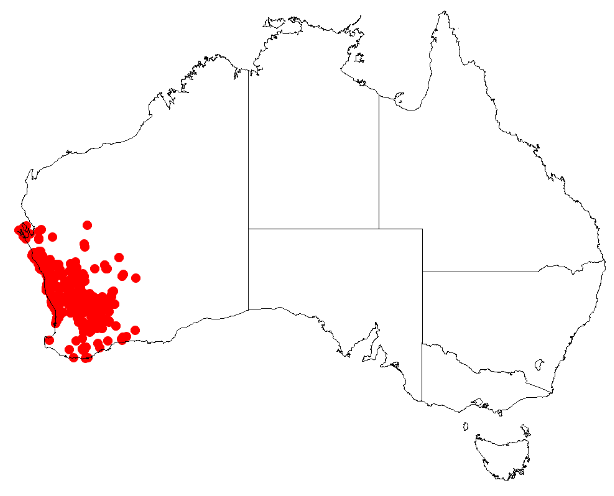
- Occurrence data from AVH

Synonyms
- Lophoclinium citrinum Endl. Podosperma gnaphaloides (Graham) F.Muell.

= Podotheca gnaphalioides =

Species of herb

Podotheca gnaphalioides (common name, golden long-heads) is a small annual herb in the family Asteraceae, endemic to Western Australia. It grows from 2 cm to 60 cm tall and is an often sticky herb, which is erect or decumbent (lying along the ground), and whose yellow or orange-yellow flowers are seen from August to November. It grows on a variety of soils, but tends to prefer sandy soils.

== Taxonomy ==
It was first described in 1845 by Robert Graham as Podotheca gnaphalioides.
