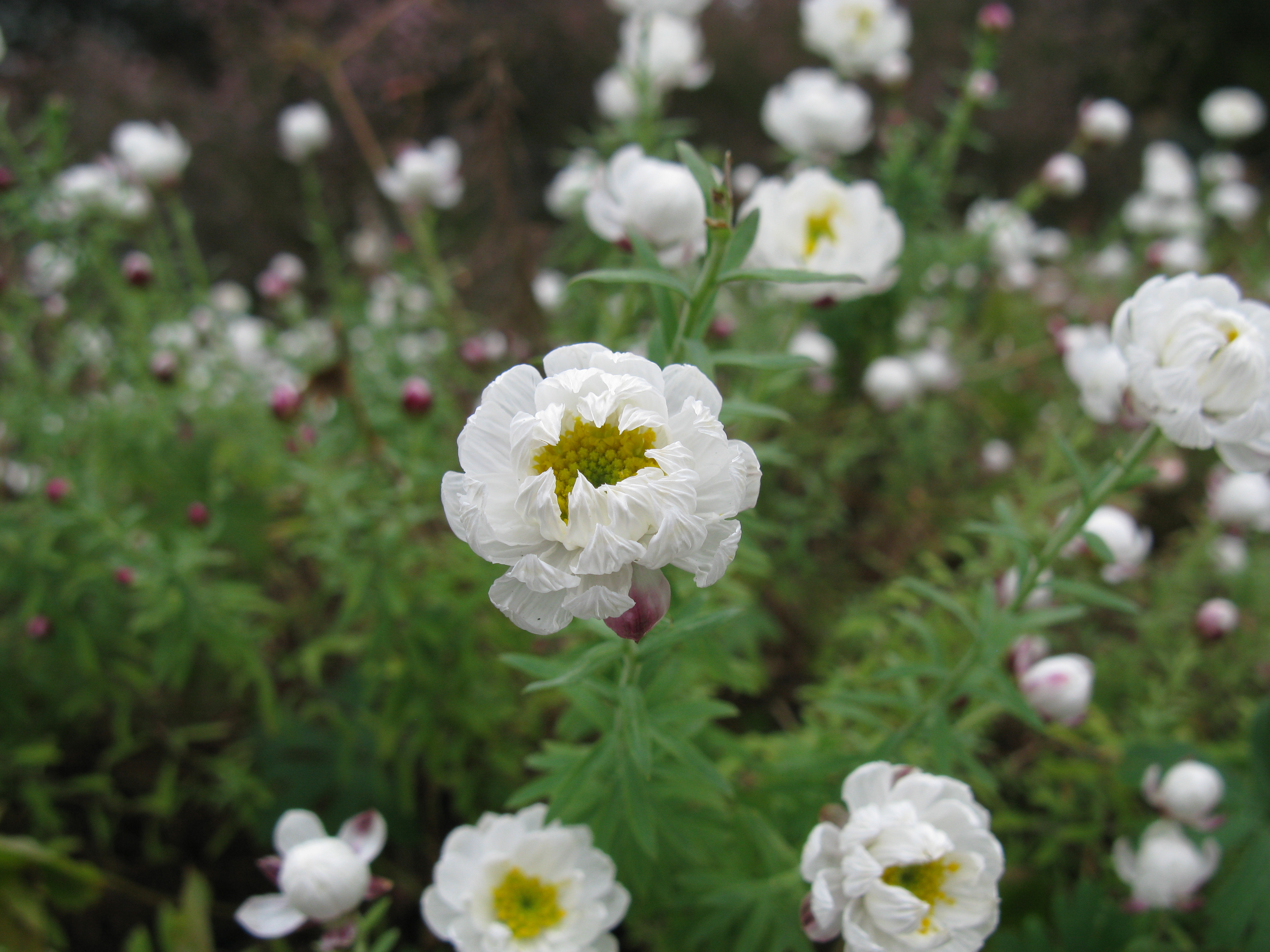

Scientific classification
- Kingdom: Plantae
- Clade: Tracheophytes
- Clade: Angiosperms
- Clade: Eudicots
- Clade: Asterids
- Order: Asterales
- Family: Asteraceae
- Genus: Rhodanthe
- Species: R. anthemoides

Binomial name
- Rhodanthe anthemoides (Sieber ex Spreng.) Paul G. Wilson

Synonyms
- Argyrocome anthemoides (Spreng.) Kuntze; Helichrysum anthemoides Sieber ex Spreng.; Helipterum anthemoides (Spreng.) A.Cunn. ex DC; Roccardia anthemdoides (Sieber ex Spreng.) Voss

= Rhodanthe anthemoides =

Chamomile sunray

Species of plant

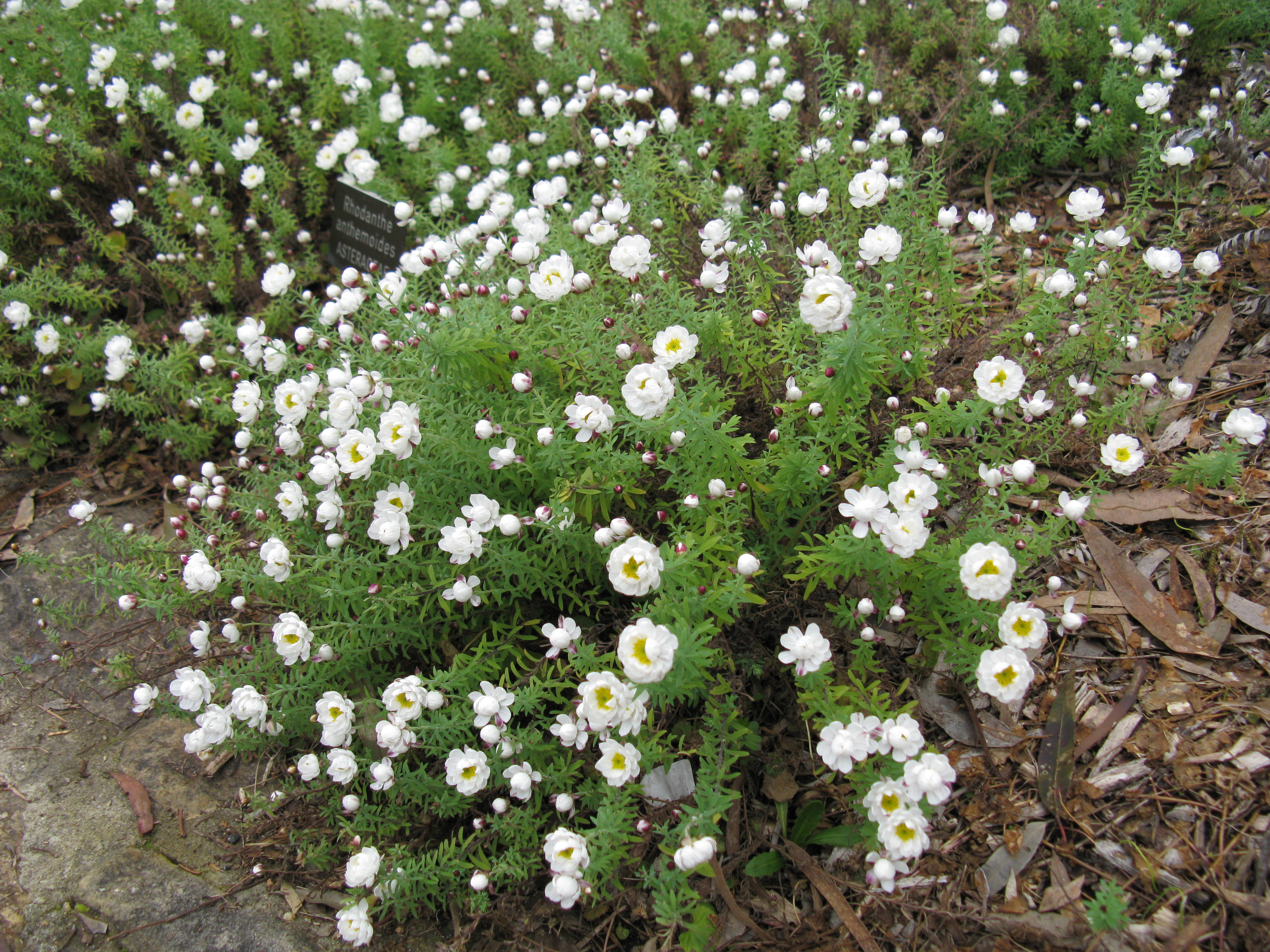
Habit

Rhodanthe anthemoides, commonly known as chamomile sunray, is a flowering plant in the family Asteraceae. It is a small, perennial shrub with greyish-green leaves, white papery flowers, yellow centre and is endemic to Australia.

== Description ==
Rhodanthe anthemoides is an upright to ascending, bushy perennial up to 30 cm (12 in) high and up to 60 cm (24 in) wide. The leaves are arranged alternate, sometimes crowded, thick, linear or lance-shaped, 4–15 mm (0.16–0.59 in) long, 0.5–2 mm (0.020–0.079 in) wide, mostly smooth, margins and mid-rib with occasional glandular hairs. The flowers heads are borne singly at the end of slender stems arising from the base, inner involucral bracts white, papery, elliptic shaped, about 6 mm (0.24 in) long and the 30-40 florets yellow. Flowering occurs from September to February and the fruit is a small, dry achene, about 2 mm (0.079 in) long and covered with silky hairs.

== Taxonomy and naming ==
This species was first described in 1826 as Helichrysum anthemoides by Kurt Polycarp Joachim Sprengel from an unpublished description by Franz Sieber. In 1992 Paul G. Wilson changed the name to Rhodanthe anthemoides and the description was published in Nuytsia. The specific epithet (anthemoides) means like Anthemis.

== Distribution and habitat ==
Chamomile sunray is a widespread species growing on sandy, rocky and alpine herb fields in Queensland, New South Wales, Victoria, and Tasmania. Although a widespread species on the mainland, in Tasmania it is listed as "rare" under the Threatened Species Protection Act.

== Cultivation ==
The species is commonly cultivated, preferring a well drained, lightly shaded situation. Cutting back after flowering prevents plants from becoming straggly. Plants are well suited to being grown in containers.

Propagation is from seed or cuttings, named cultivars requiring the latter method to be true to type.
