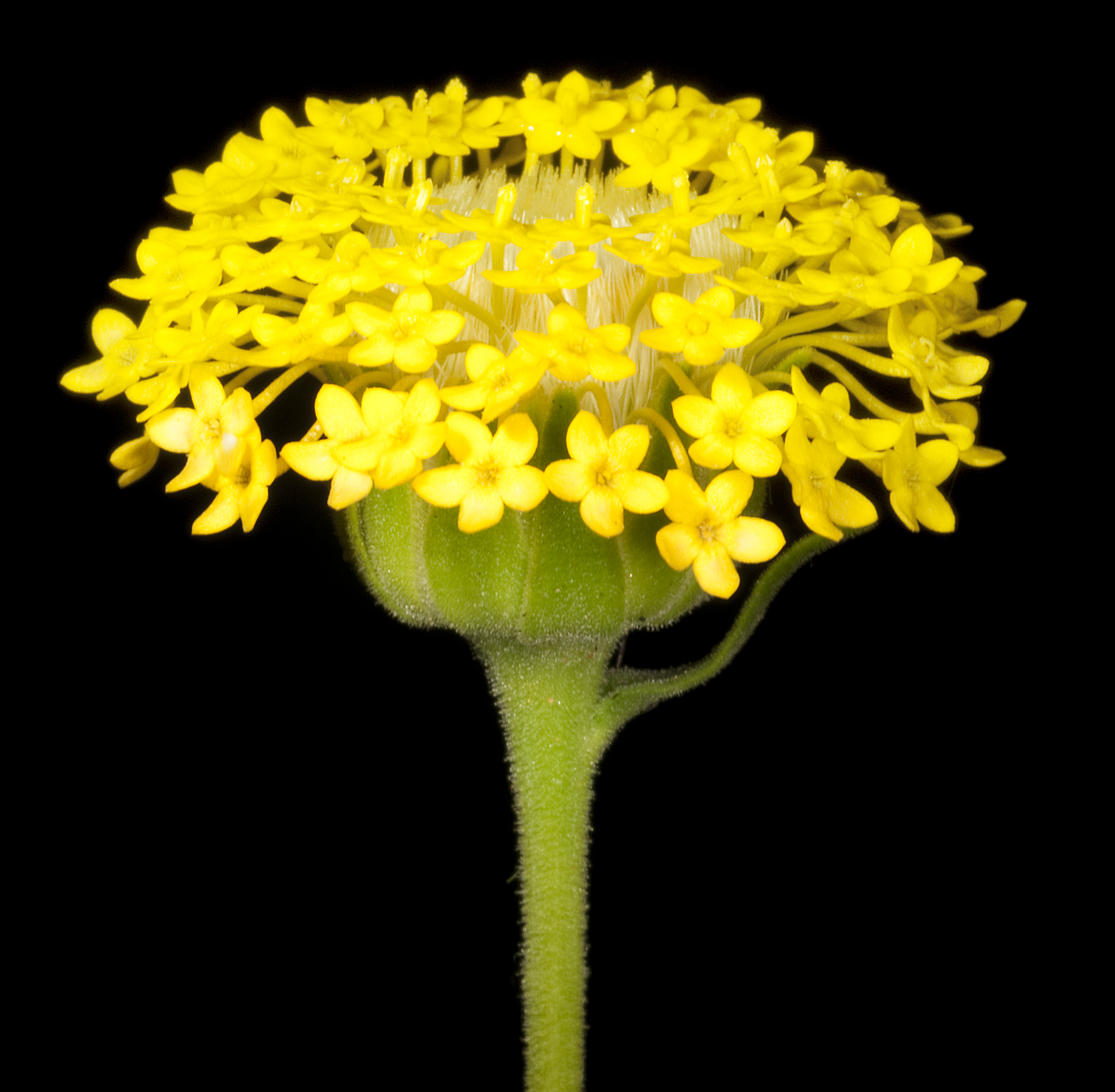
- Podotheca chrysantha
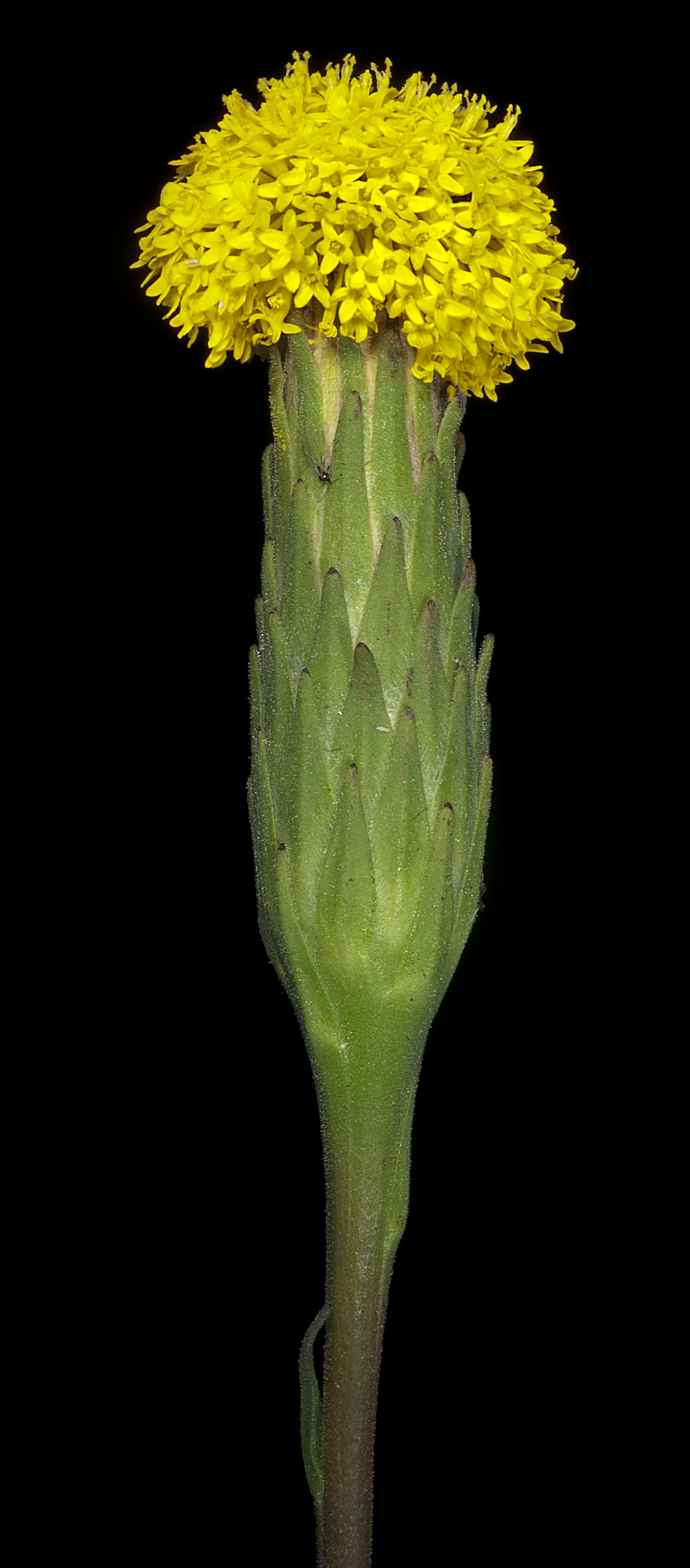
- Podotheca gnaphalioides

Scientific classification
- Kingdom: Plantae
- Clade: Tracheophytes
- Clade: Angiosperms
- Clade: Eudicots
- Clade: Asterids
- Order: Asterales
- Family: Asteraceae
- Subfamily: Asteroideae
- Tribe: Gnaphalieae
- Genus: Podotheca; Cass., conserved name

Synonyms
- Podosperma Labill.

= Podotheca =

Genus of plants

Podotheca is a genus of flowering plants in the tribe Gnaphalieae within the family Asteraceae. All species are endemic to Western Australia, except for Podotheca angustifolia which occurs across the south of Australia (Western Australia, South Australia, Victoria, southwestern New South Wales, †Tasmania).

== Taxonomy ==
The genus, Podotheca, was first described by Cassini in 1822 and the type species is Podotheca angustifolia (Labill.) Less.

Species

- Podotheca angustifolia (Labill.) Less. - sticky longheads, sticky heads
- Podotheca chrysantha (Steetz) Benth. - yellow podotheca
- Podotheca gnaphalioides Graham - golden long-heads
- Podotheca pritzelii P.S.Short
- Podotheca uniseta P.S.Short
- Podotheca wilsonii P.S.Short

formerly included

see Rhodanthe

- Podotheca pollackii (F.Muell.) Diels - Rhodanthe pollackii (F.Muell.) Paul G.Wilson
