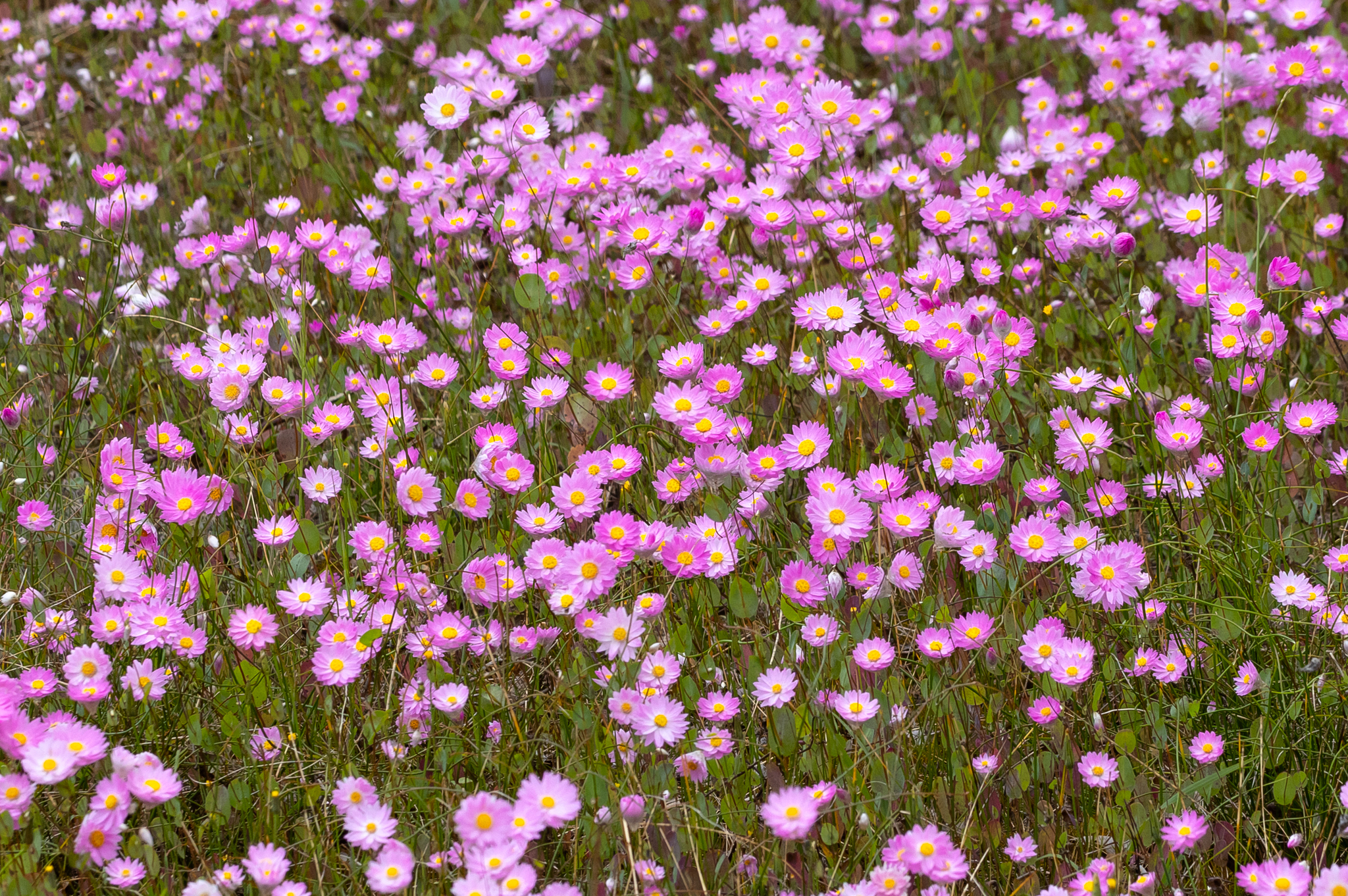
- Rhodanthe manglesii at North Stirlings, Western Australia
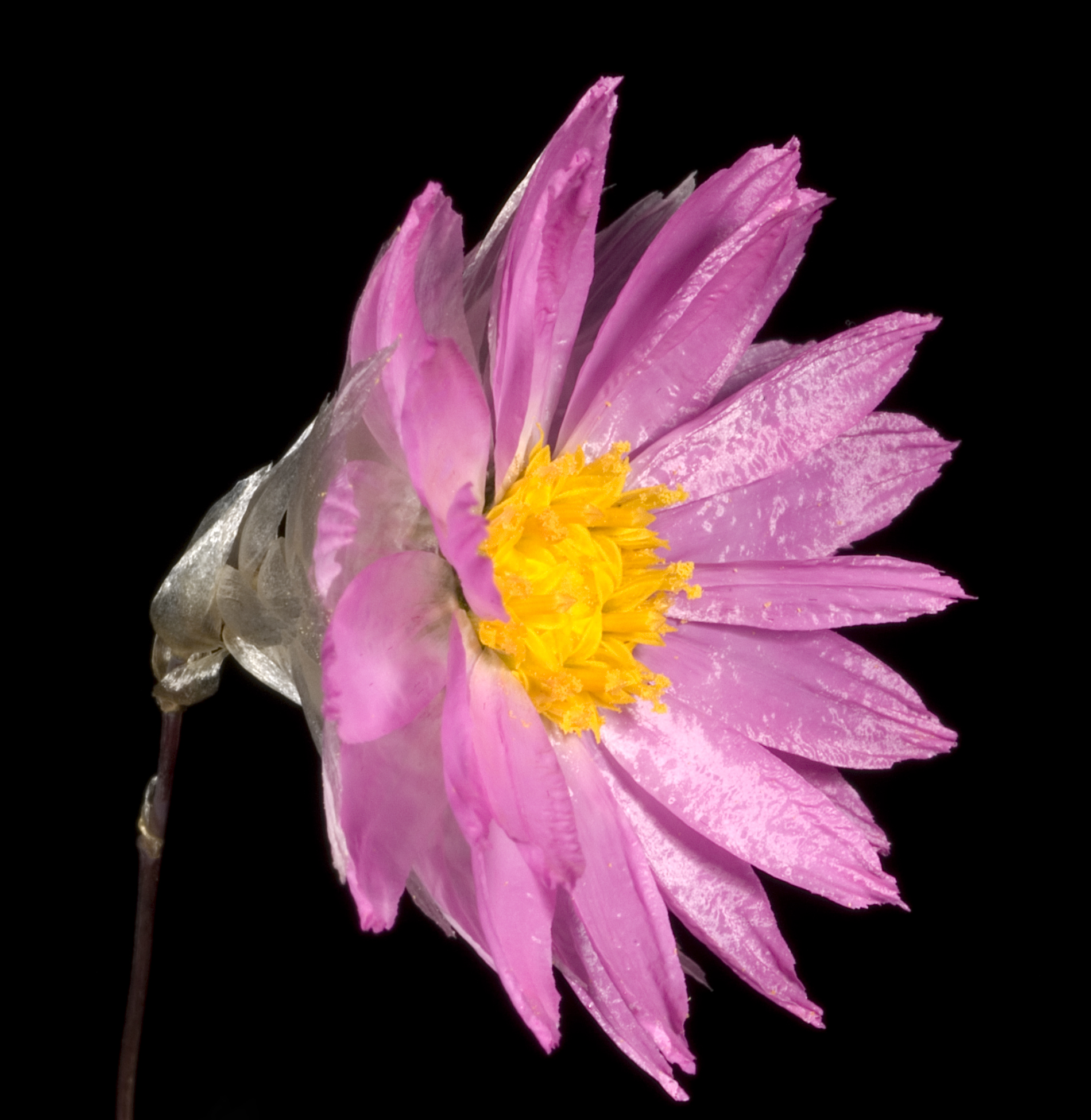

Scientific classification
- Kingdom: Plantae
- Clade: Tracheophytes
- Clade: Angiosperms
- Clade: Eudicots
- Clade: Asterids
- Order: Asterales
- Family: Asteraceae
- Genus: Rhodanthe
- Species: R. manglesii

Binomial name
- Rhodanthe manglesii Lindl.

Synonyms
- Helichrysum manglesii (Lindl.) Baill.; Argyrocome manglesii (Lindl.) Kuntze; Helipterum cryptanthum O.H.Sarg.; Helipterum manglesii (Lindl.) F.Muell. ex Benth.

= Rhodanthe manglesii =

Species of plant

Rhodanthe manglesii is a herbaceous plant, a native of Western Australia, that was introduced and cultivated in England in 1834 from seeds collected by James Mangles. Common names for this daisy include pink sunray, silver bells, Australian strawflower, timeless rose or Mangles everlasting.

The flower head is yellow and surrounded by pink or white florets, this emerges from nodding, silver coloured, papery bracts that form bell-like buds during August to October in its native habitat. The habit is slender and erect, ranging in height from 0.1 to 0.6 metres, and the plant often carpets areas of sandy, clayey or loamy soils.

First described by John Lindley in 1834 in the Botanical Register. The description was accompanied by an illustration by Sarah Drake.
