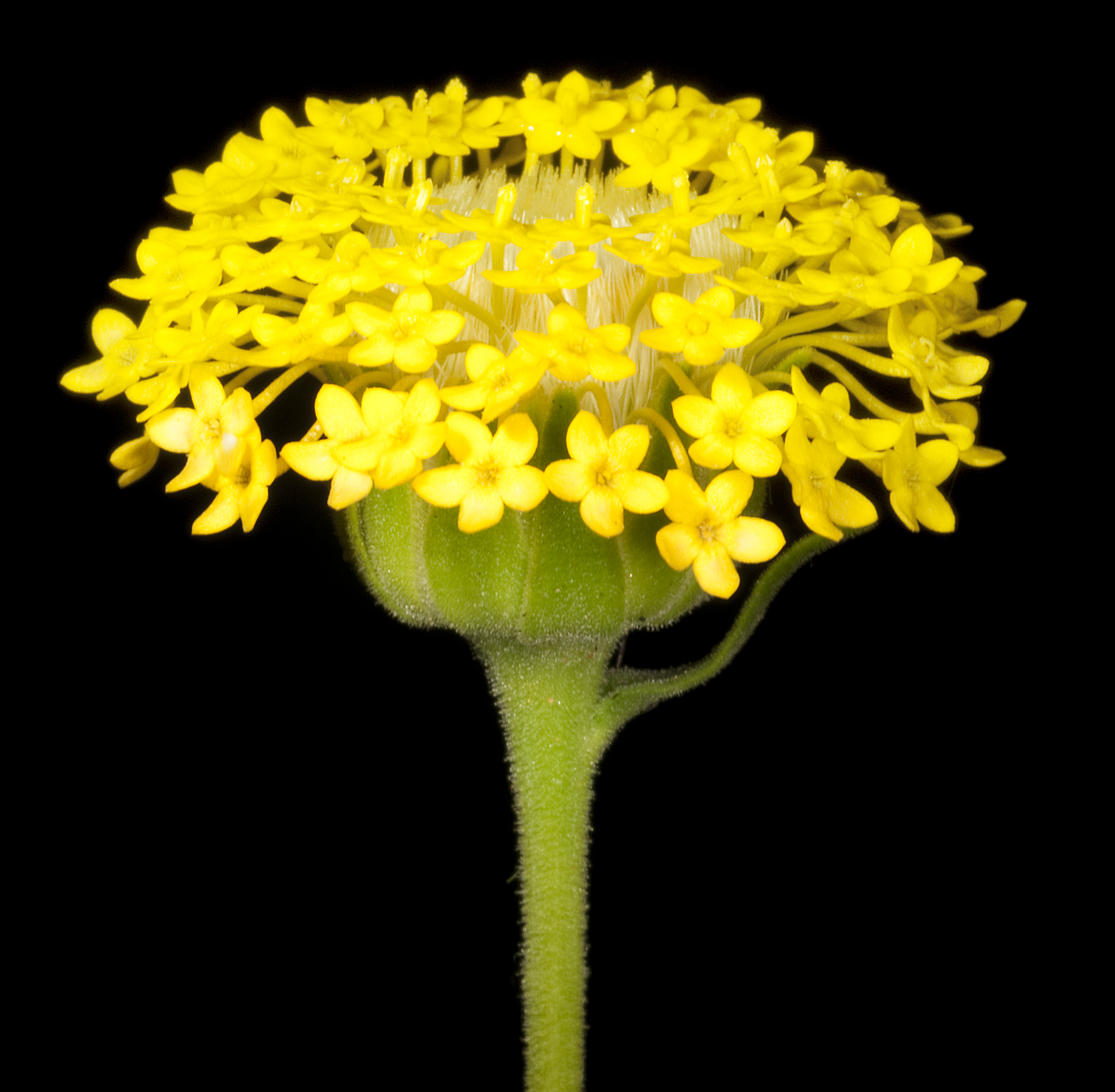

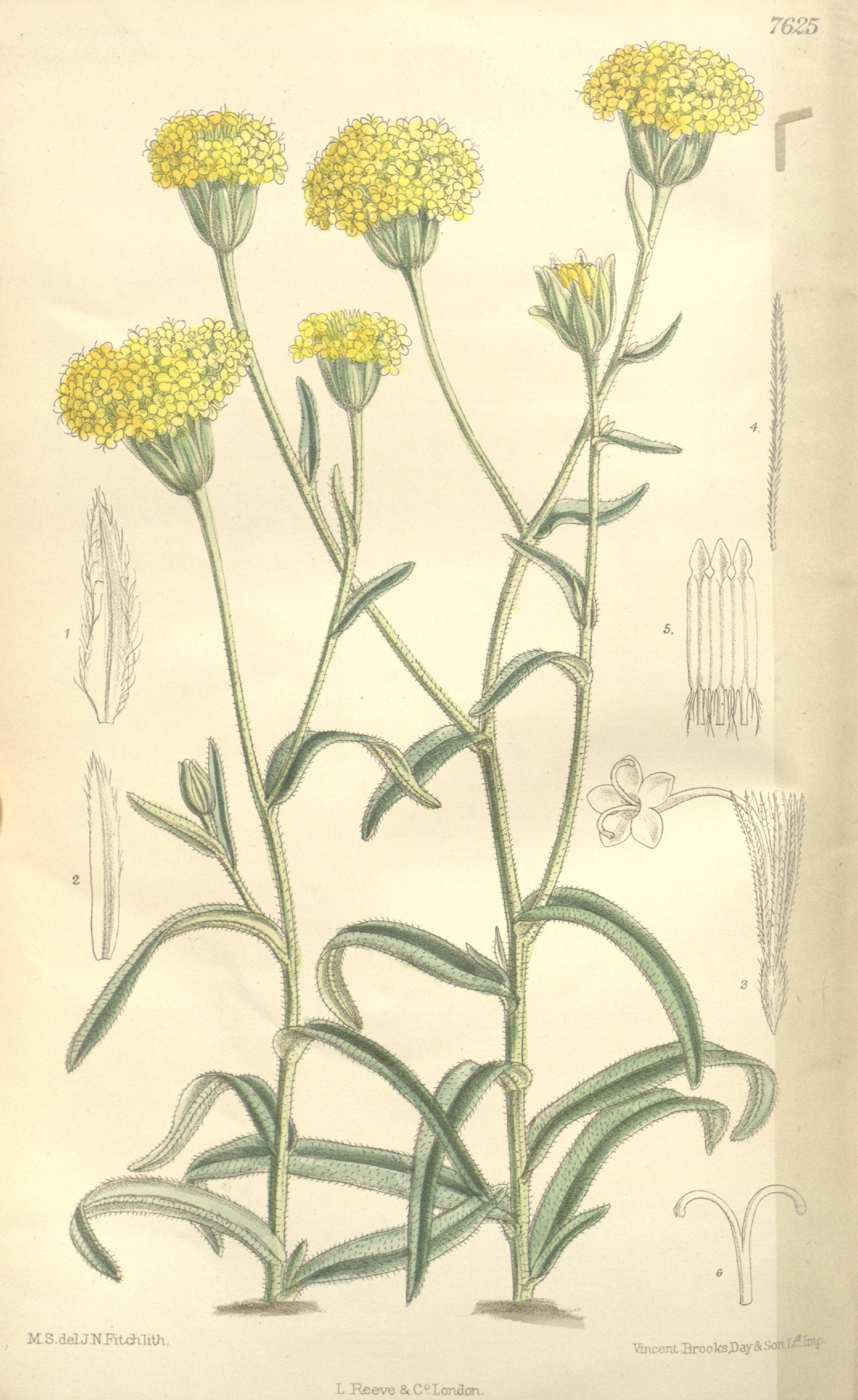

Scientific classification
- Kingdom: Plantae
- Clade: Tracheophytes
- Clade: Angiosperms
- Clade: Eudicots
- Clade: Asterids
- Order: Asterales
- Family: Asteraceae
- Genus: Podotheca
- Species: P. chrysantha

Binomial name
- Podotheca chrysantha (Steetz) Benth.
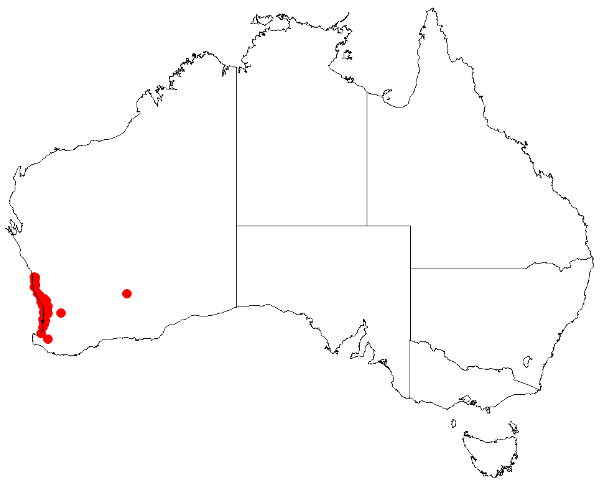
- Occurrence data from AVH

Synonyms
- Ixiolaena chrysantha Steetz; Podosperma chrysanthum F.Muell.

= Podotheca chrysantha =

Species of flowering plant

Podotheca chrysantha is a small herb in the family Asteraceae endemic to Western Australia. It grows from 0.2 to 0.5 m high, and has yellow flowers which are seen from August to December. It grows in sand over limestone or laterite on limestone ridges and in wet depressions.

== Taxonomy ==
It was first described in 1845 by Joachim Steetz as Ixiolaena chrysantha. In 1867 it was assigned to the genus Podotheca by George Bentham.
