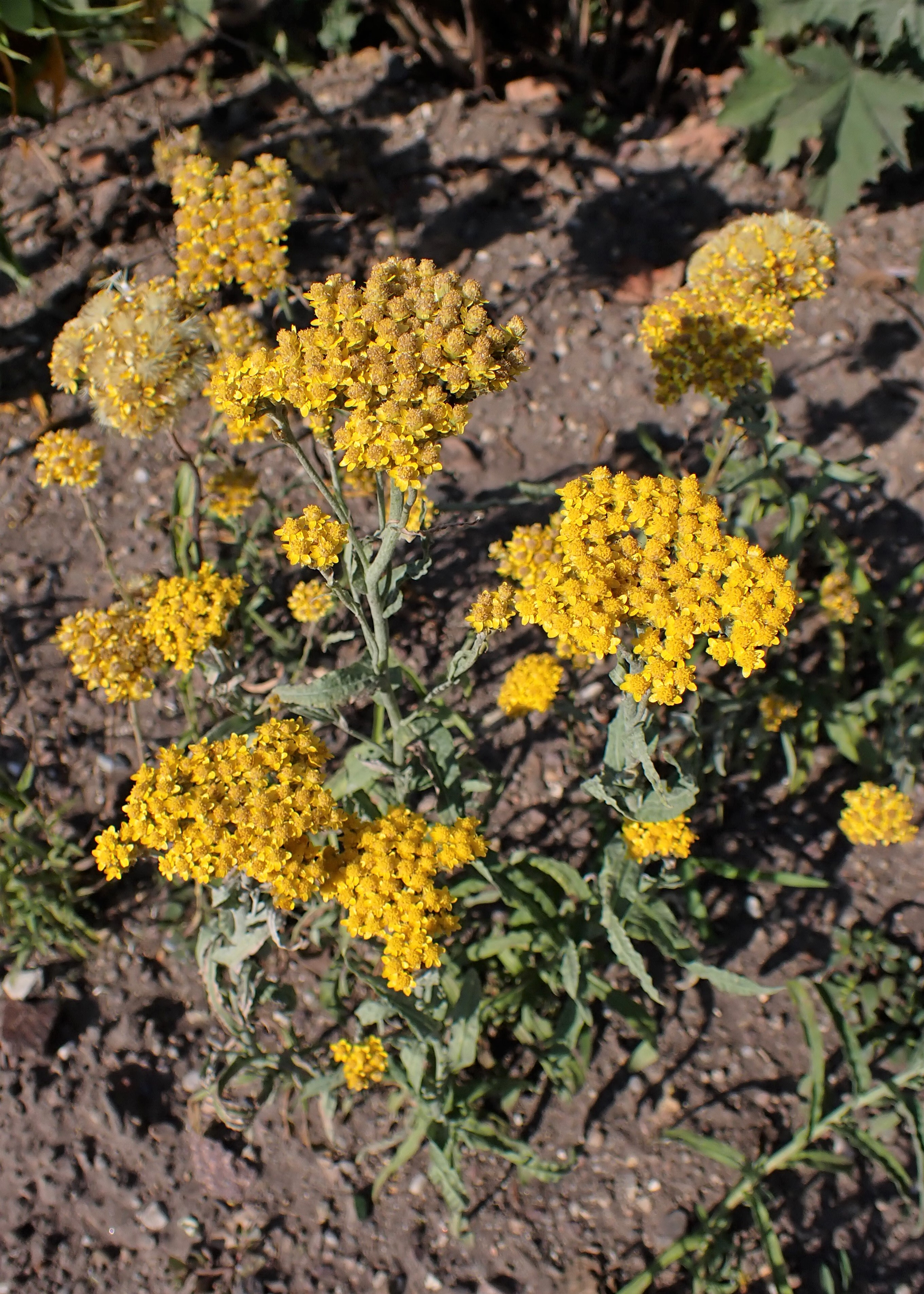

Scientific classification
- Kingdom: Plantae
- Clade: Tracheophytes
- Clade: Angiosperms
- Clade: Eudicots
- Clade: Asterids
- Order: Asterales
- Family: Asteraceae
- Genus: Rhodanthe
- Species: R. humboldtiana

Binomial name
- Rhodanthe humboldtiana (Gaudich.) Paul G.Wilson

= Rhodanthe humboldtiana =

Golden cluster everlasting

Species of plant

Rhodanthe humboltiana, commonly known as the golden cluster everlasting, is a flowering annual in the family Asteraceae. It is a small, upright, branching plant with yellow flowers, and is endemic to Western Australia.

== Description ==
Rhodanthe humboldtiana is an upright or ascending, bushy annual to 30 cm (12 in) high with woolly or almost smooth stems arising from the base. The leaves are sessile, narrow, linear, greyish-green, 10–20 mm (0.39–0.79 in) long, 0.5–2 mm (0.020–0.079 in) wide, and the apex rounded. The flower heads are 1–2 cm (0.39–0.79 in) in diameter, borne singly at the end of leafy branchlets. The bracts are arranged in several rows, white, dry, pointed, mostly upright or the inner bracts spreading, corolla about 5 mm (0.20 in) long, toothed and the 20-50 florets yellow. The flowering occurs from August to January but mostly in spring, and the fruit is a rounded achene about 3 mm (0.12 in) long and covered with soft, silky, weak hairs.

== Taxonomy and naming ==
This species was first described as Helipterum humboldtianum in 1829 by Gaudich. In 1992, Paul G. Wilson changed the name to Rhodanthe humboldtiana and the description was published in Nuytsia. The specific epithet (humboldtiana) is named in honour of Alexander von Humboldt.

== Distribution and habitat ==
The Golden cluster everlasting grows on sand plains and heathland, sometimes with limestone from north of Perth to Shark Bay in Western Australia.
