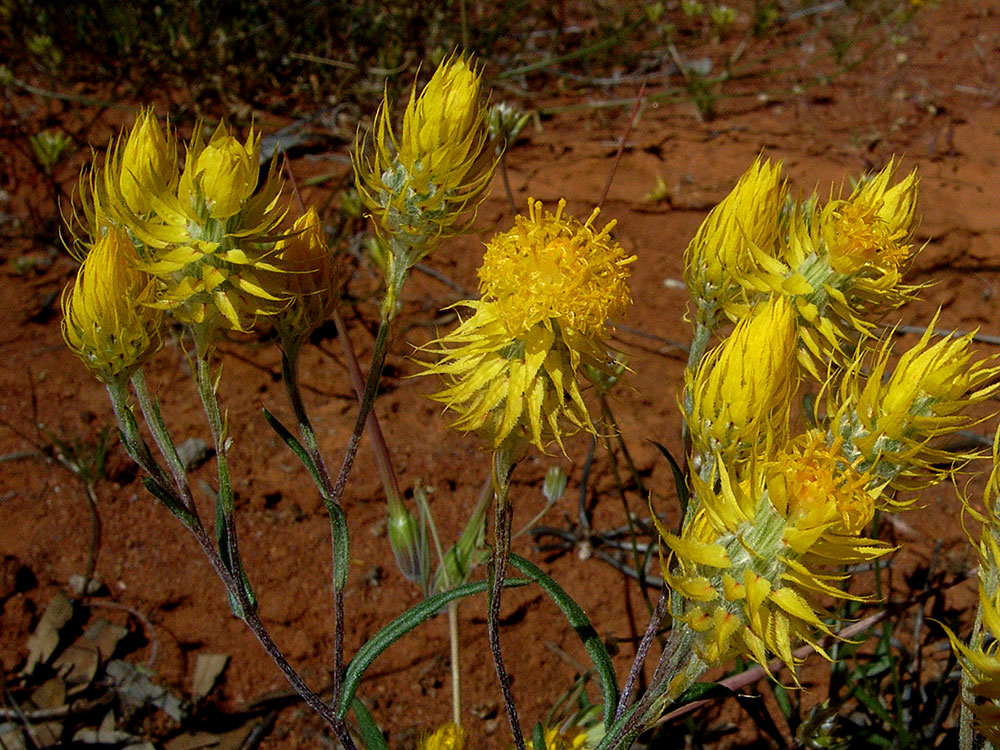

Scientific classification
- Kingdom: Plantae
- Clade: Tracheophytes
- Clade: Angiosperms
- Clade: Eudicots
- Clade: Asterids
- Order: Asterales
- Family: Asteraceae
- Genus: Waitzia
- Species: W. acuminata

Binomial name
- Waitzia acuminata Steetz

= Waitzia acuminata =

Species of plant

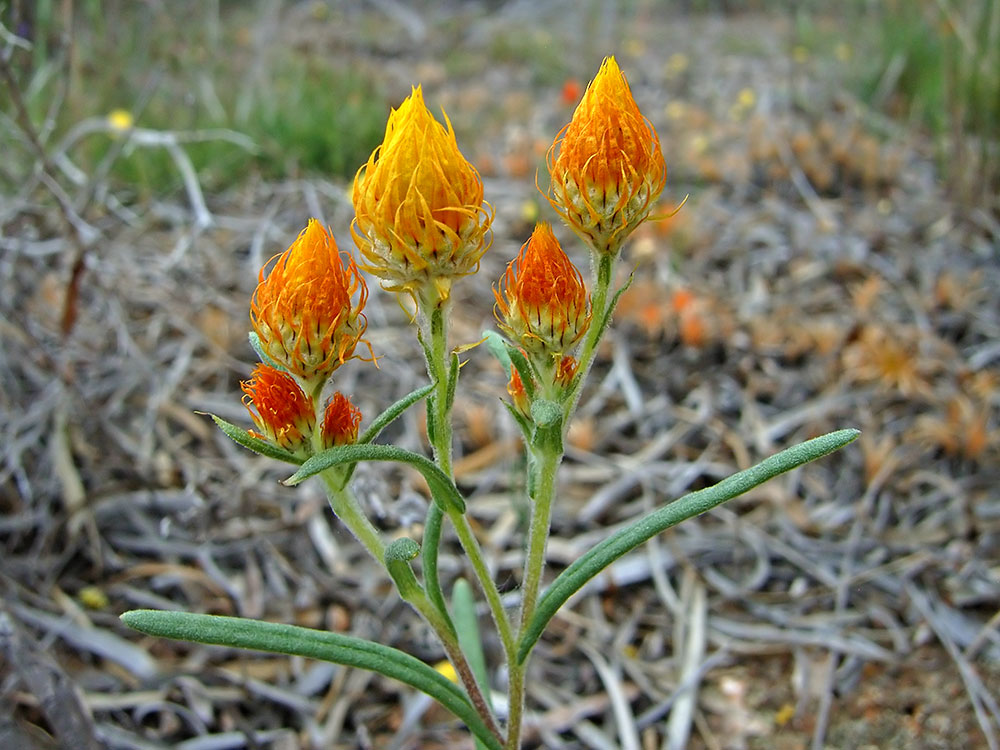

Waitzia acuminata, commonly known as orange immortelle, is an annual forb in the family Asteraceae. It is native to Australia. Plants grow to between 10 and 60 cm in height and have leaves that are long and narrow. These are between 2 and 7 cm long and 2 to 5 mm in width. The yellow, orange or white flowers appear between July and January. Waitzia Acuminata occurs in all mainland states of Australia and is currently not considered rare or endangered. Its genus Waitzia is named after German botanist Karl Friedrich Waitz. Acuminata is a latin name describing things that are tapered to a point, named after the plants spindle like outer bracts.

The species was first formally described in 1845 by German botanist Joachim Steetz in Plantae Preissianae.

Two varieties are currently recognised:

- Waitzia acuminata Steetz var. acuminata
- Waitzia acuminata var. albicans Paul G.Wilson

== Description ==
Waitzia acuminata steetz can grow up to 600 mm high and has reddish stems. The plants stem indumentum is sparsely glandular and glandular pilose. It has narrow green leaves that are about 20-70mm long. The flower heads are shaped like an egg or bell and have yellow/orange coloured petals. The plants flowers often grow in bunches from each stem. The plants seeds have a bumpy surface and are narrow with tapered ends. Each seed has up to twenty long fine bristles which protrude from one of the tapered ends. Waitzia accuminata var. albicans is a less common variety, it has similar characteristics apart from the flowers. The flowers develop with a pink colour that gradually turns white as the flower blossoms.

== Taxonomy ==
Waitzia acuminata belongs to the tribe Inuleae (Asteraceae) within the sub-tribe Gnaphalieae. Waitzia acuminata is one of five species of the genus Waitzia. At present there are two variations of Waitzia acuminata; Waitzia acuminata steetz and Waitzia acuminata var. albicans.

== Distribution and habitat ==
The species is most abundant in the southern half of Western Australia. It is also sparsely distributed amongst arid parts of the other mainland states. The plant is typically found in environments containing deep sandy red soils and in shallow stony soils (sandstone and granite) amongst mallee and mulgoa woodlands. The plant is also known to grow in saline depressions, sand, loam, gravel, litter, laterite, sand dunes, plains, and clay soils.

== Ecology ==
Waitzia acuminata grows in sand dunes and rocky outcrops, favouring warmer climates and areas with high sun exposure.

== Reproduction and dispersal ==
The plants germination rate is affected by temperature and light, previous studies have shown the seeds germination rate is greater or more rapid in warmer climatic conditions. Another study has shown that exposure to light can stimulate the plants germination rate. Waitzia accuminata uses cross pollination via insects.

== Threats ==
Prior studies suggest environments with increased exotic grasses may have decreased abundance of Waitzia acuminata.

== Uses ==
Due to its aesthetics Waitzia acuminata is used in as an ornamental garden plant across parts of Australia. For example, it is featured in the Kings Park Botanic Garden in Western Australia.

== Gallery ==
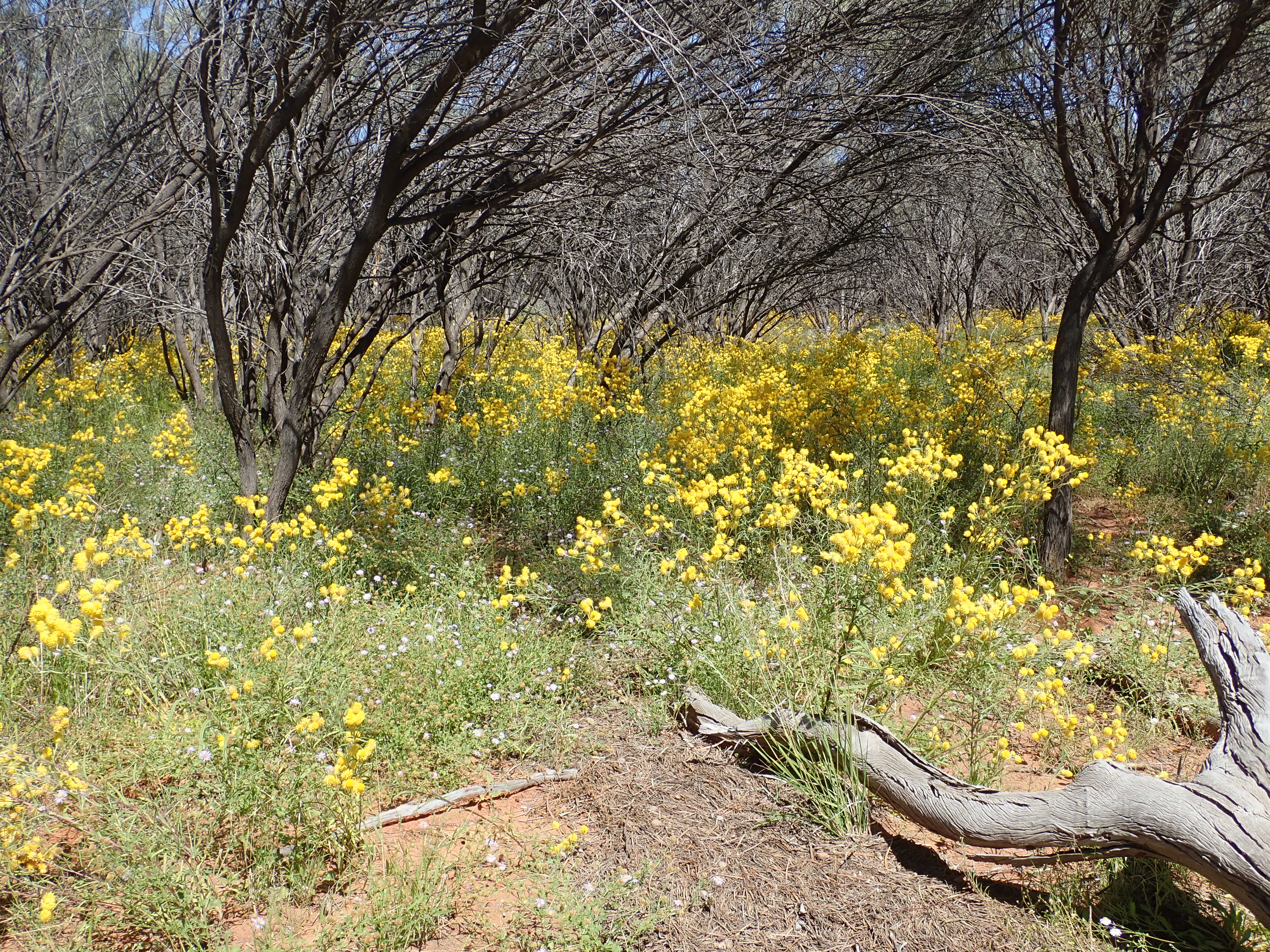
Massed flowers
