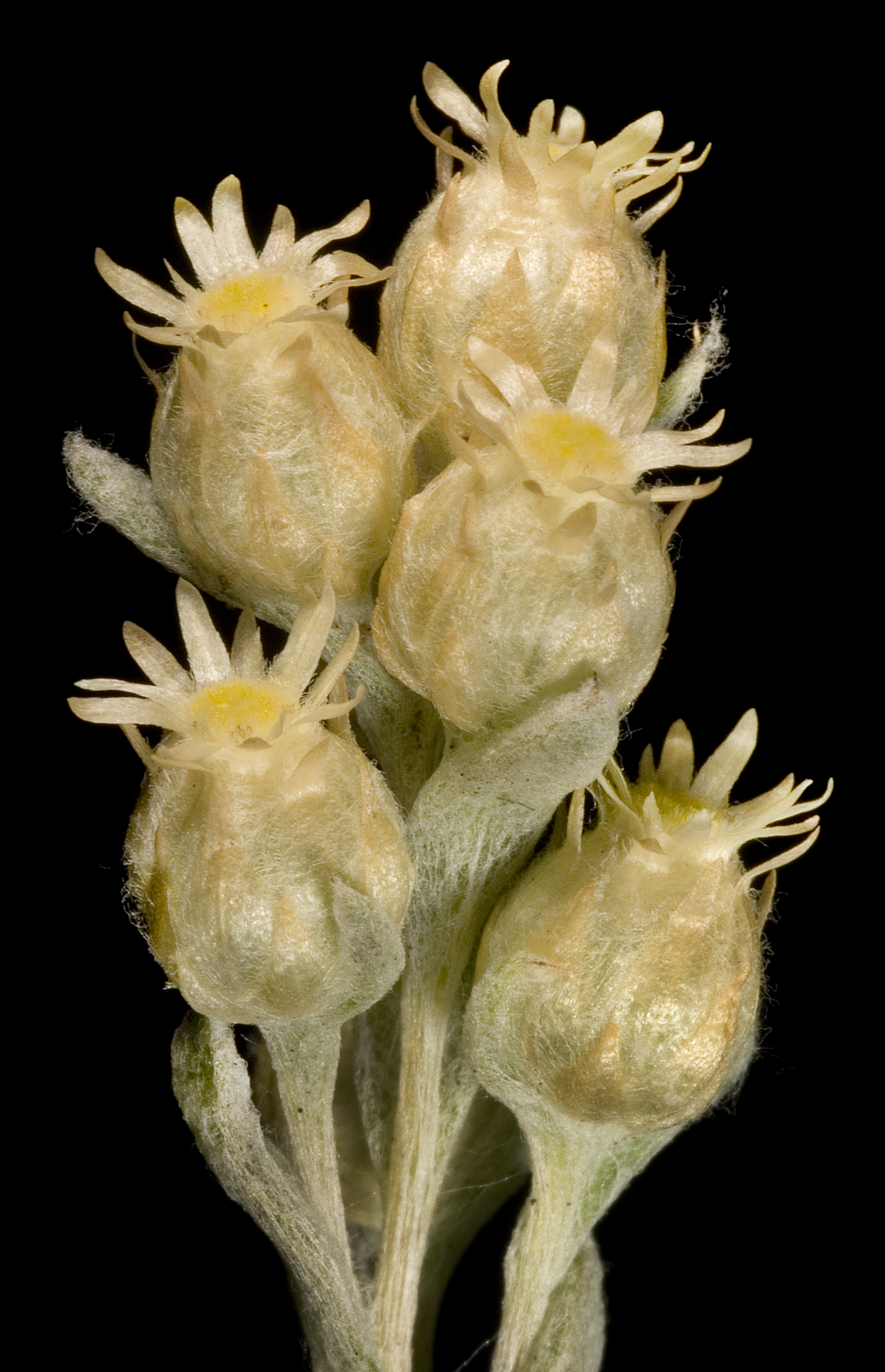

Scientific classification
- Kingdom: Plantae
- Clade: Tracheophytes
- Clade: Angiosperms
- Clade: Eudicots
- Clade: Asterids
- Order: Asterales
- Family: Asteraceae
- Subfamily: Asteroideae
- Tribe: Gnaphalieae
- Genus: Pterochaeta; Steetz
- Species: P. paniculata

Binomial name
- Pterochaeta paniculata Steetz

= Pterochaeta paniculata =

Species of flowering plant

Pterochaeta is a monotypic plant genus in the Asteraceae family, endemic to Western Australia. It was first described in 1845 by Joachim Steetz and its only species is Pterochaeta paniculata.

It has been found to be a symptomless host of the pathogen, Phytophthora cinnamomi.
