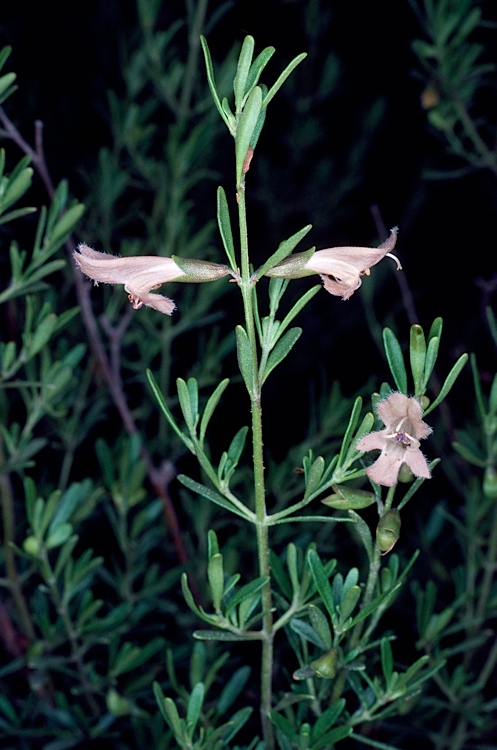

Scientific classification
- Kingdom: Plantae
- Clade: Tracheophytes
- Clade: Angiosperms
- Clade: Eudicots
- Clade: Asterids
- Order: Lamiales
- Family: Lamiaceae
- Genus: Prostanthera
- Species: P. leichhardtii

Binomial name
- Prostanthera leichhardtii Benth.

= Prostanthera leichhardtii =

Species of flowering plant

Prostanthera leichhardtii is a species of flowering plant in the family Lamiaceae and is endemic to Queensland. It is a shrub with blue or greyish-blue flowers, and occasionally yellow or cream ones.
