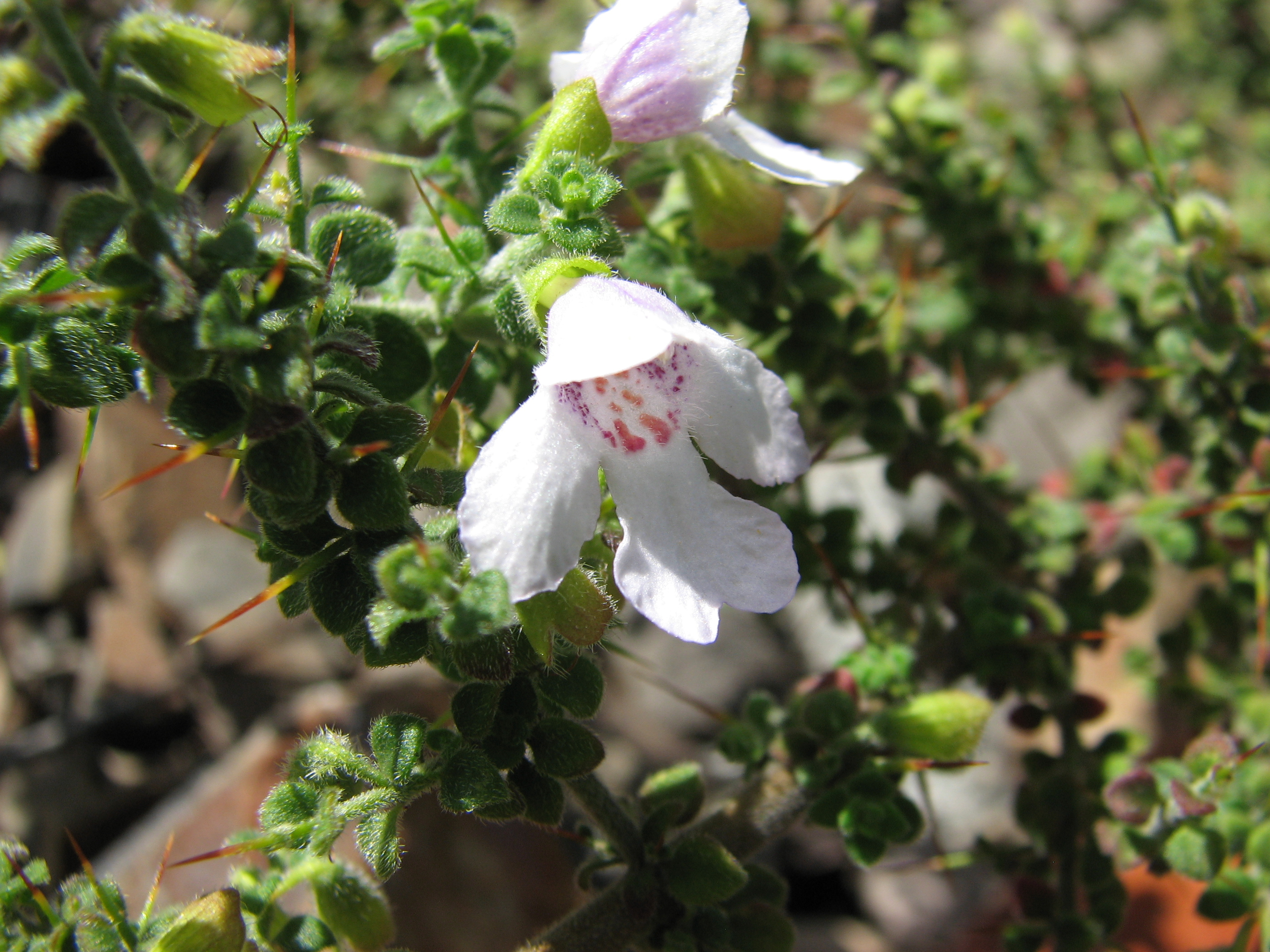
- In Royal Botanic Gardens Victoria, Melbourne

Scientific classification
- Kingdom: Plantae
- Clade: Tracheophytes
- Clade: Angiosperms
- Clade: Eudicots
- Clade: Asterids
- Order: Lamiales
- Family: Lamiaceae
- Genus: Prostanthera
- Species: P. arapilensis

Binomial name
- Prostanthera arapilensis M.L.Williams, Drinnan & N.G.Walsh
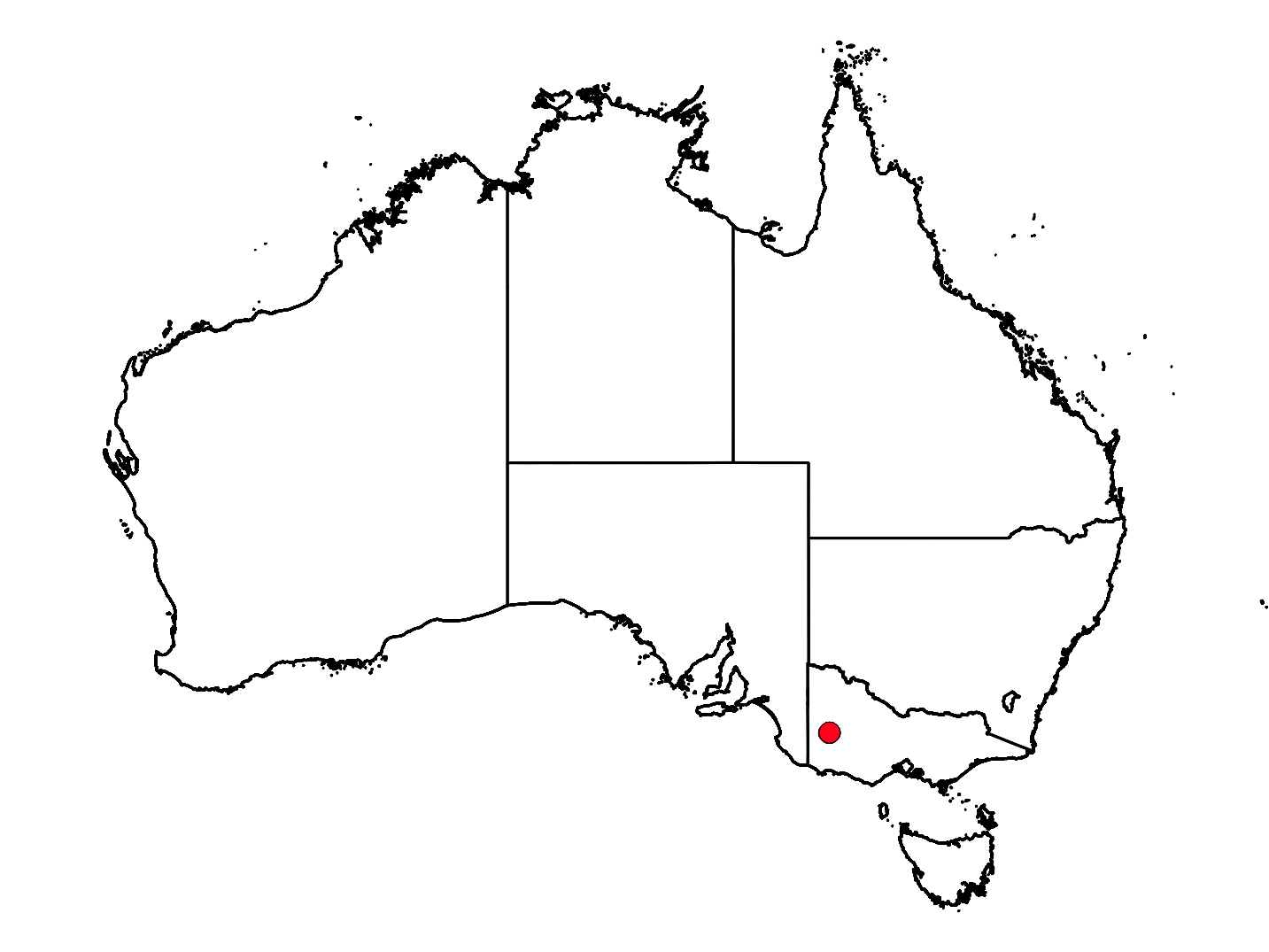
- Occurrence data from AVH

Synonyms
- Prostanthera sp. (Mt Arapiles); Prostanthera spinosa auct. non F.Muell.: Williams, M.L., Drinnan, A.N. & Walsh, N.G. (2006)

= Prostanthera arapilensis =

Species of flowering plant

Prostanthera arapilensis is a flowering plant in the family Lamiaceae and is endemic to a small area of Victoria, Australia. It is an erect shrub with hairy branches, broadly egg-shaped to more or less round leaves and pale mauve or white flowers with orange-brown spots or streaks inside the petal tube.

== Description ==
Prostanthera arapilensis is an erect, aromatic shrub that typically grows to a height of 0.5–1.5 m (1 ft 8 in – 4 ft 11 in) with hairy branches that have spines 6–15 mm (0.24–0.59 in) long arranged in opposite pairs at right angles to each other. The leaves are light to dark green, paler on the lower surface, egg-shaped to more or less round, 30–45 mm (1.2–1.8 in) long and 1–2 mm (0.039–0.079 in) wide on a petiole up to 1 mm (0.039 in) long. The leaves are hairy with oil glands on the lower surface. The flowers are arranged in leaf axils with bracteoles 1.5–2 mm (0.059–0.079 in) long and 0.2–0.3 mm (0.0079–0.0118 in) wide. The sepals are 5.5–7 mm (0.22–0.28 in) long, joined at the base forming a tube 3–4 mm (0.12–0.16 in) long with two lobes, the upper lobe 1.5–3 mm (0.059–0.118 in) long. The petals are 12–19 mm (0.47–0.75 in) long, pale mauve or white with orange-brown spots or streaks inside the petal tube.

== Taxonomy ==
Prostanthera arapilensis was first formally described in 2006 by Mark Williams, Andrew Drinnan and N.G.Walsh in the journal Australian Systematic Botany from specimens collected on Mount Arapiles.

== Distribution and habitat ==
This mintbush grows in heathy woodland and scrubland and is only known from the rocky summit of Mount Arapiles.
