= Prostanthera incurvata =

Scientific classification
- Kingdom: Plantae
- Clade: Tracheophytes
- Clade: Angiosperms
- Clade: Eudicots
- Clade: Asterids
- Order: Lamiales
- Family: Lamiaceae
- Genus: Prostanthera
- Species: P. incurvata

Binomial name
- Prostanthera incurvata B.J.Conn
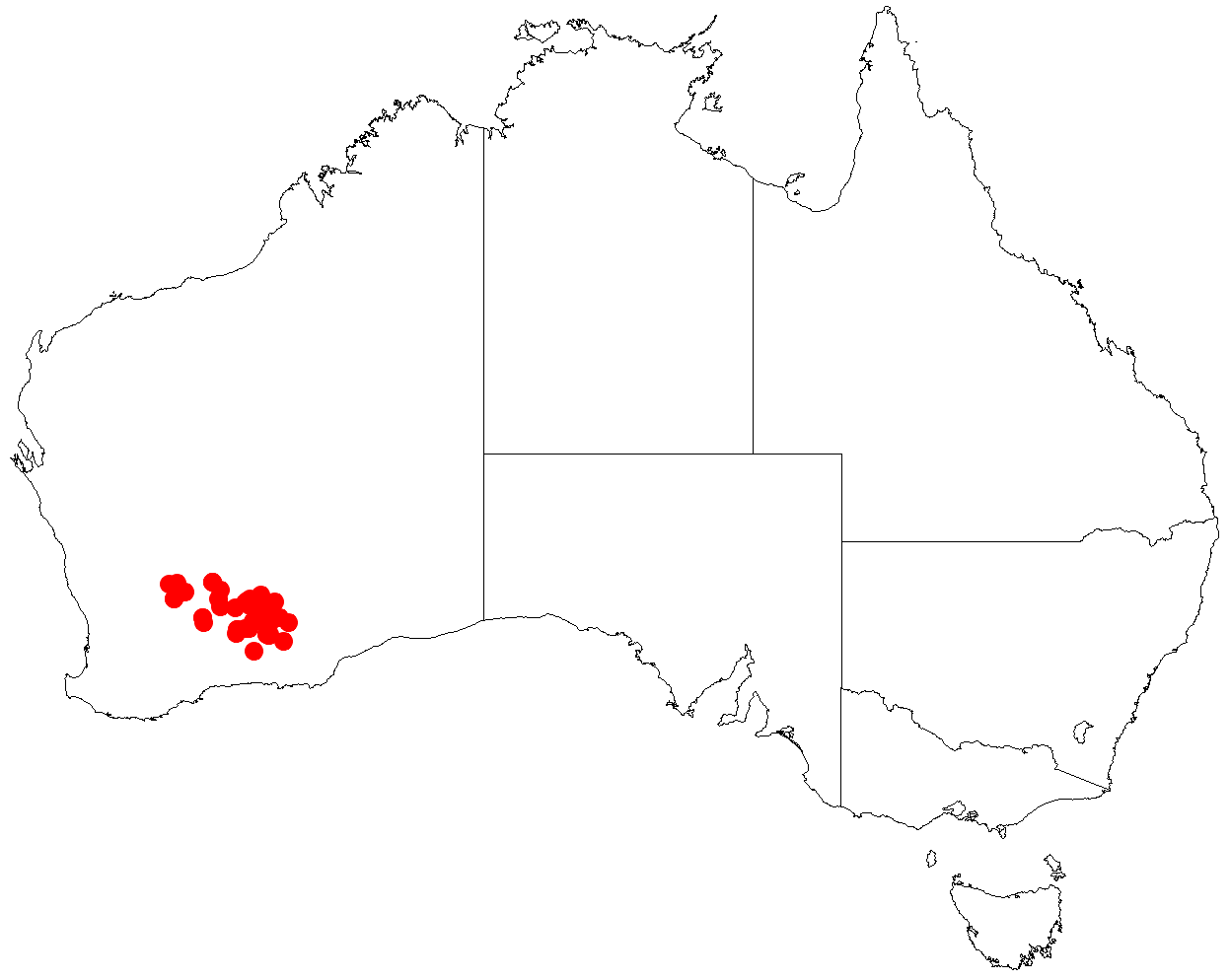
- Occurrence data from AVH

Species of flowering plant

Prostanthera incurvata is a species of flowering plant in the family Lamiaceae and is endemic to the inland of Western Australia. It is a small, erect shrub with hairy branches, narrow oblong to narrow egg-shaped leaves with the narrower end towards the base, and pink to red, sometimes yellow flowers.

== Description ==
Prostanthera incurvata is an erect, spreading shrub that typically grows to a height of 0.4–1.5 m (1 ft 4 in – 4 ft 11 in) and has hairy branches. The leaves are usually clustered towards the ends of the branches and are narrow oblong to narrow egg-shaped with the narrower end towards the base, 5–10.5 mm (0.20–0.41 in) long, 0.8–1.2 mm (0.031–0.047 in) wide and sessile. The flowers are arranged singly in leaf axils near the ends of branchlets, each flower on a pedicel 0.8–1.5 mm (0.031–0.059 in) long. The sepals are green, 6–8 mm (0.24–0.31 in) long and form a tube 4–5 mm (0.16–0.20 in) long with two lobes about 2 mm (0.079 in) long and 3.5–4 mm (0.14–0.16 in) wide. The petals are pink to red, sometimes yellow, 15–20 mm (0.59–0.79 in) long and form a tube about 10 mm (0.39 in) long. The lower lip of the petal tube has three lobes, the centre lobe broadly egg-shaped and concave, 3–3.5 mm (0.12–0.14 in) long and the side lobes 2–2.5 mm (0.079–0.098 in) long. The upper lip is about 3 mm (0.12 in) long with a central notch 1–1.5 mm (0.039–0.059 in) deep. Flowering occurs from in April or from August to October.

== Taxonomy ==
Prostanthera incurvata was first formally described in 1987 by Barry Conn in the Journal of the Adelaide Botanic Gardens from specimens collected near Lake Cowan.

== Distribution and habitat ==
This mintbush sometimes grows in low woodland, and has been collected in the Avon Wheatbelt, Coolgardie and Mallee biogeographic regions.

== Conservation status ==
Prostanthera incurvata is classified as "not threatened" by the Government of Western Australia Department of Parks and Wildlife.
