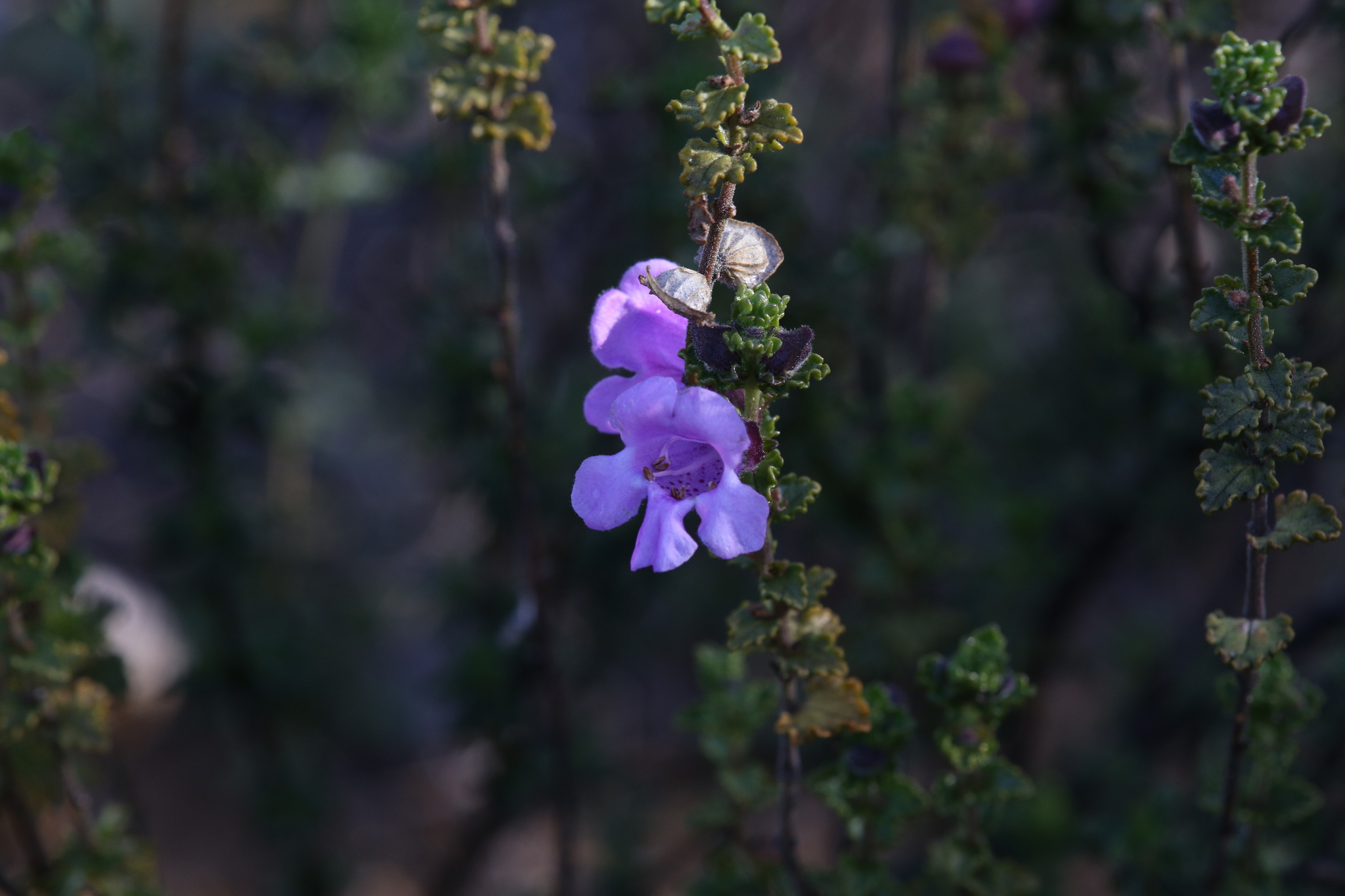

Scientific classification
- Kingdom: Plantae
- Clade: Tracheophytes
- Clade: Angiosperms
- Clade: Eudicots
- Clade: Asterids
- Order: Lamiales
- Family: Lamiaceae
- Genus: Prostanthera
- Species: P. eckersleyana

Binomial name
- Prostanthera eckersleyana F.Muell.
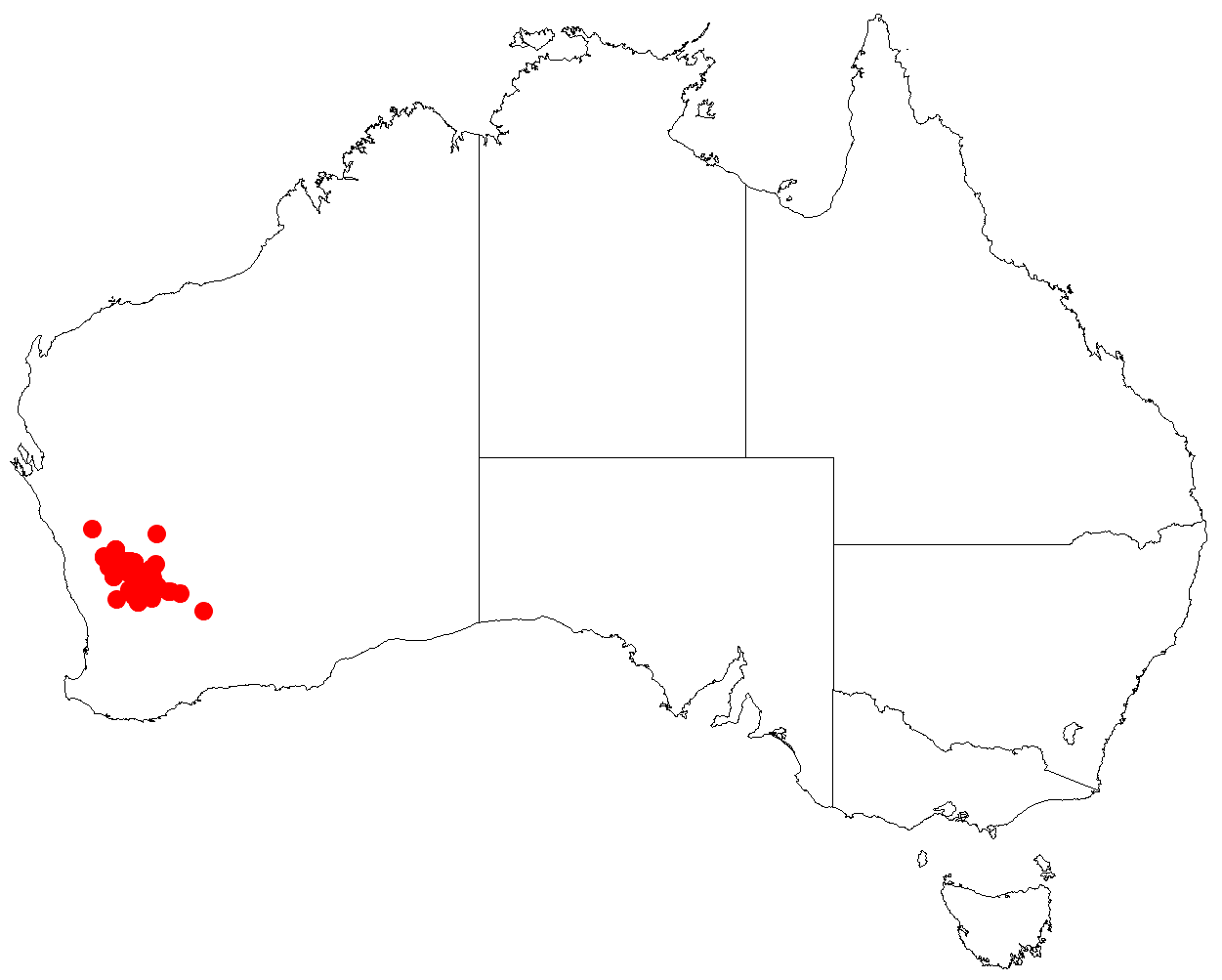
- Occurrence data from AVH

= Prostanthera eckersleyana =

Crinkly mintbush

Species of flowering plant

Prostanthera eckersleyana, commonly known as crinkly mintbush, is a species of flowering plant in the family Lamiaceae and is endemic to the southwest of Western Australia. It is an erect or spreading shrub with sticky, hairy branchlets, egg-shaped to elliptical leaves and blue, mauve to purple or violet flowers with maroon spots inside the petal tube.

== Description ==
Prostanthera eckersleyana is an erect or spreading shrub that typically grows to a height of 0.2–1 m (7.9 in – 3 ft 3.4 in) and has cylindrical, sticky, hairy branchlets. The leaves are mid-green, egg-shaped to elliptical, aromatic and sticky, 7–10 mm (0.28–0.39 in) long and 3.5–8.5 mm (0.14–0.33 in) wide on a petiole 1–1.5 mm (0.039–0.059 in) long. The flowers are arranged singly in four to ten leaf axils near the ends of branchlets, each flower on a hairy pedicel 1.5–3.5 mm (0.059–0.138 in) long. The sepals are green with a mauve to purple tinge and form a tube 4.5–5.5 mm (0.18–0.22 in) long with two lobes, the lower lobe 3.5–4.5 mm (0.14–0.18 in) long and the upper lobe 3–5 mm (0.12–0.20 in) long. The petals are blue, mauve to purple or violet with maroon spots inside the tube, 15–24 mm (0.59–0.94 in) and fused to form a tube 14–18 mm (0.55–0.71 in) long with crinkled edges. The lower lip has three lobes, the centre lobe broadly spatula-shaped, 8–10 mm (0.31–0.39 in) long and 9–10 mm (0.35–0.39 in) wide, the side lobes 3.5–6.5 mm (0.14–0.26 in) long and 3–6.5 mm (0.12–0.26 in) wide. The upper lip is 5–7 mm (0.20–0.28 in) long and 10–13 mm (0.39–0.51 in) wide with a notch 2.5–5 mm (0.098–0.197 in) deep. Flowering occurs from May to July or December.

== Taxonomy ==
Prostanthera eckersleyana was first formally described in 1876 by Ferdinand von Mueller in his book Fragmenta phytographiae Australiae. The specific epithet (eckersleyana) honours Florence Eckersley.

== Distribution and habitat ==
This mintbush grows on plains, often with Melaleuca and Acacia species and occurs in the Avon Wheatbelt, Coolgardie and Yalgoo biographic regions of Western Australia.

== Conservation status ==
Prostanthera eckersleyana is classified as "not threatened" by the Western Australian Government Department of Parks and Wildlife.
