= Prostanthera laricoides =

Scientific classification
- Kingdom: Plantae
- Clade: Tracheophytes
- Clade: Angiosperms
- Clade: Eudicots
- Clade: Asterids
- Order: Lamiales
- Family: Lamiaceae
- Genus: Prostanthera
- Species: P. laricoides

Binomial name
- Prostanthera laricoides B.J.Conn
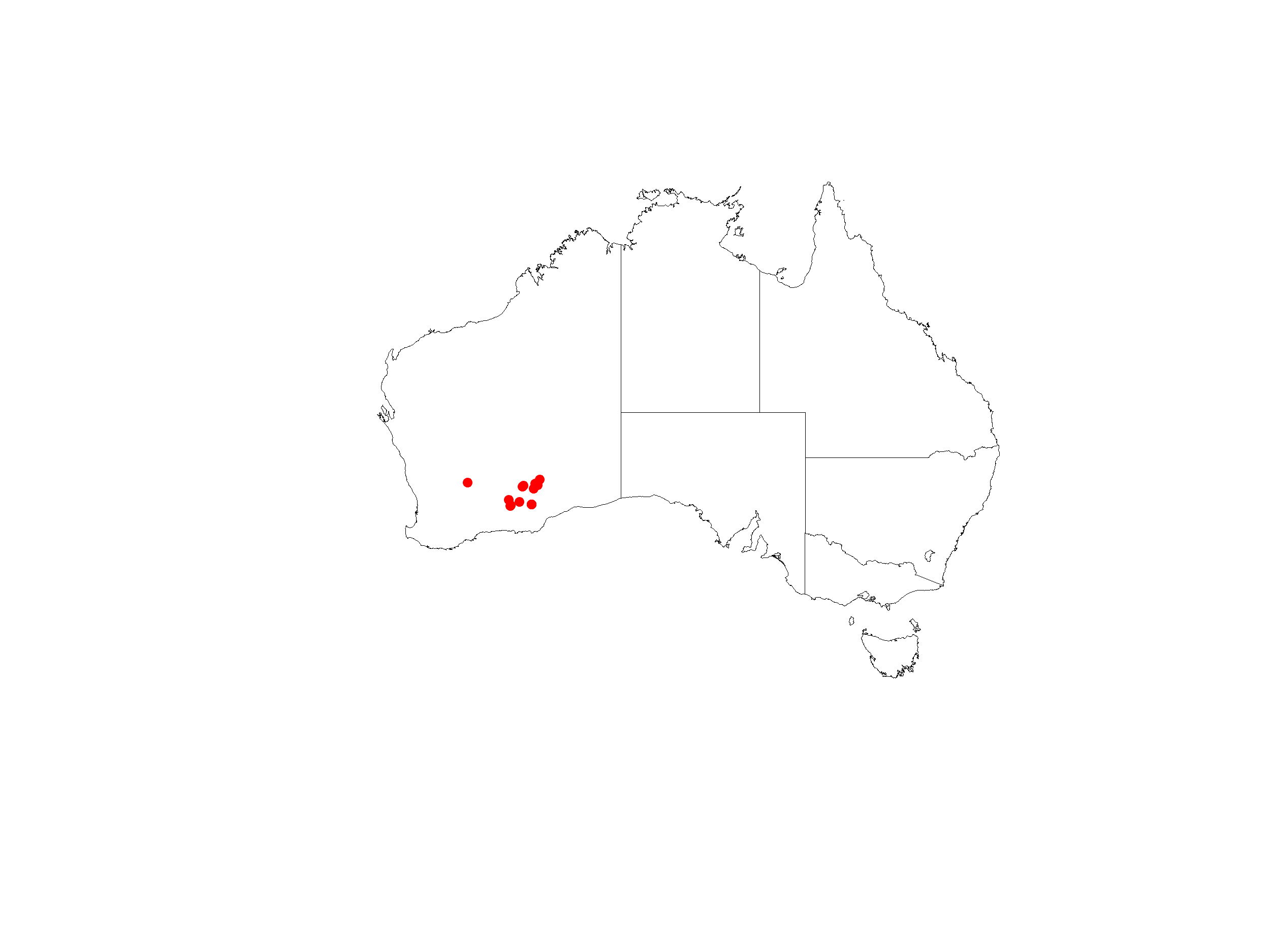
- Occurrence data from AVH

Species of flowering plant

Prostanthera laricoides is a species of flowering plant in the family Lamiaceae and is endemic to the inland of Western Australia. It is a small shrub with densely hairy, densely glandular branchlets, cylindrical leaves clustered near the ends of branchlets, and dull, light red flowers.

== Description ==
Prostanthera laricoides is a shrub that typically grows to a height of 0.6–1.2 m (2 ft 0 in – 3 ft 11 in) and has densely hairy, densely glandular branches. The leaves are usually clustered towards the ends of the branchlets and are cylindrical, 10–18 mm (0.39–0.71 in) long, about 0.5 mm (0.020 in) wide and sessile. The flowers are arranged singly in leaf axils near the ends of branchlets, each flower on a hairy pedicel about 1 mm (0.039 in) long. The sepals are 4–6 mm (0.16–0.24 in) long and form a tube 3–4.5 mm (0.12–0.18 in) long with two lobes 1.5–2 mm (0.059–0.079 in) long and about 3 mm (0.12 in) wide. The petals are dull light red, 14–18 mm (0.55–0.71 in) long and form a tube 10–12 mm (0.39–0.47 in) long. The lower lip of the petal tube has three lobes, the centre lobe oblong, 3–4 mm (0.12–0.16 in) long and the side lobes about 2 mm (0.079 in) long. The upper lip is about 4 mm (0.16 in) long and 5 mm (0.20 in) wide with a central notch about 1 mm (0.039 in) deep. Flowering occurs from August to March.

== Taxonomy ==
Prostanthera laricoides was first formally described in 1984 by Barry Conn in the Journal of the Adelaide Botanic Gardens from specimens collected near Cundeelee in 1967.

== Distribution and habitat ==
This mintbush sometimes grows on ridges amongst granite rocks and has been collected in the Avon Wheatbelt, Coolgardie and Great Victoria Desert biogeographic regions.

== Conservation status ==
Prostanthera laricoides is classified as "not threatened" by the Government of Western Australia Department of Parks and Wildlife.
