= Prostanthera collina =

Scientific classification
- Kingdom: Plantae
- Clade: Tracheophytes
- Clade: Angiosperms
- Clade: Eudicots
- Clade: Asterids
- Order: Lamiales
- Family: Lamiaceae
- Genus: Prostanthera
- Species: P. collina

Binomial name
- Prostanthera collina Domin
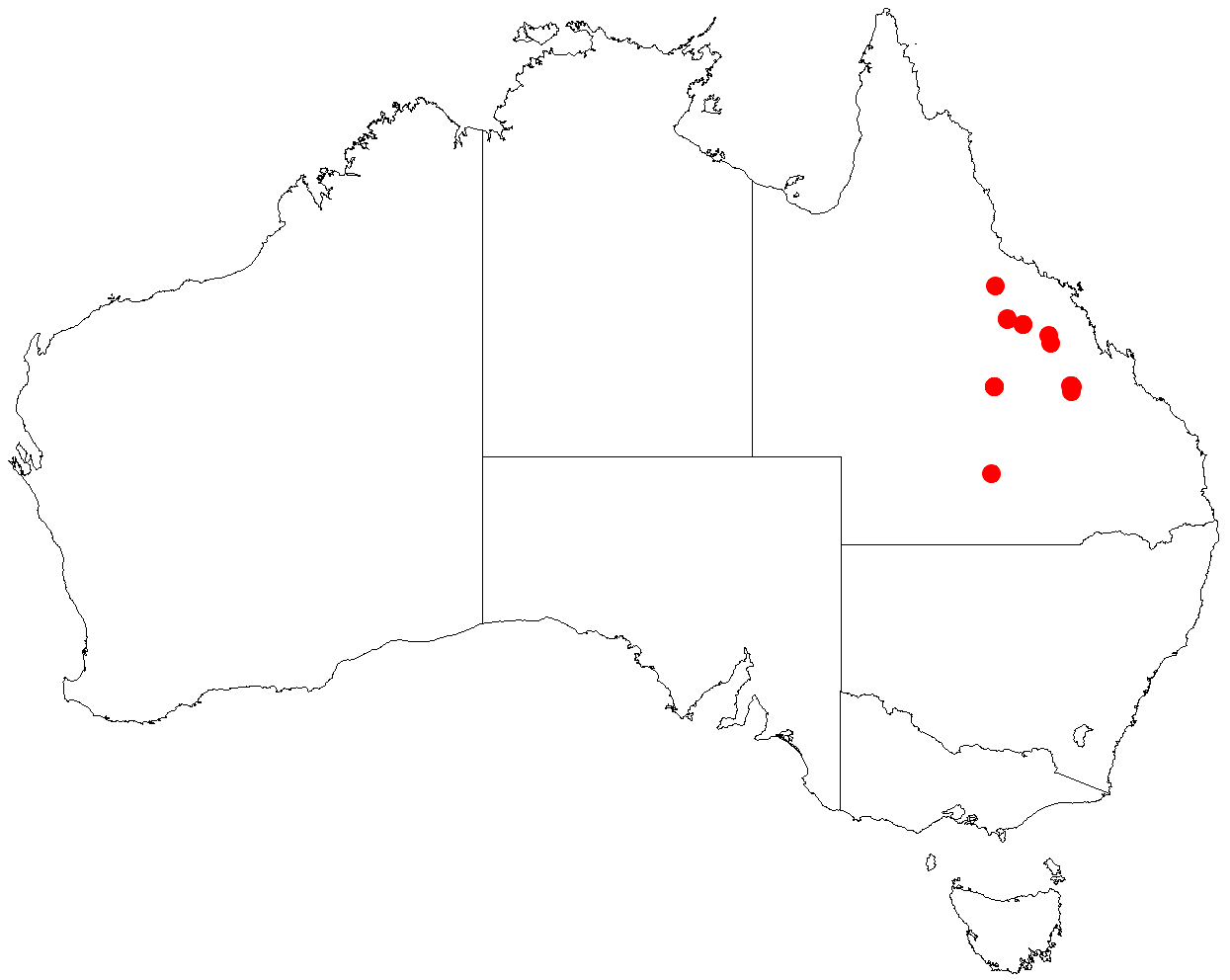
- Prostanthera collina occurrence

Species of flowering plant

Prostanthera collina is a species of flowering plant in the family Lamiaceae and is endemic to Queensland. It is a shrub with white or pale mauve flowers.

== Description ==
Prostanthera collina is a stiff, upright shrub 1–2 m (3 ft 3 in – 6 ft 7 in) high with a greyish appearance. The white or pale mauve flowers have purple markings in the throat and borne in leaf axils. The leaves are lance to oblanceolate shaped, slightly wavy, smooth margins, greyish hue and on a short petiole.

== Taxonomy and naming ==
Prostanthera collina was first formally described in 1928 by Karel Domin and the description was published in Bibliotheca Botanica. The specific epithet (collina) means "living on hills".

== Distribution ==
This species is endemic to Queensland with a restricted distribution, it grows north of Jericho and in the Warrego Range.
