= Prostanthera tozerana =

Conservation status
- Critically Endangered (NCA)

Scientific classification
- Kingdom: Plantae
- Clade: Tracheophytes
- Clade: Angiosperms
- Clade: Eudicots
- Clade: Asterids
- Order: Lamiales
- Family: Lamiaceae
- Genus: Prostanthera
- Species: P. tozerana

Binomial name
- Prostanthera tozerana B.J.Conn & T.C.Wilson
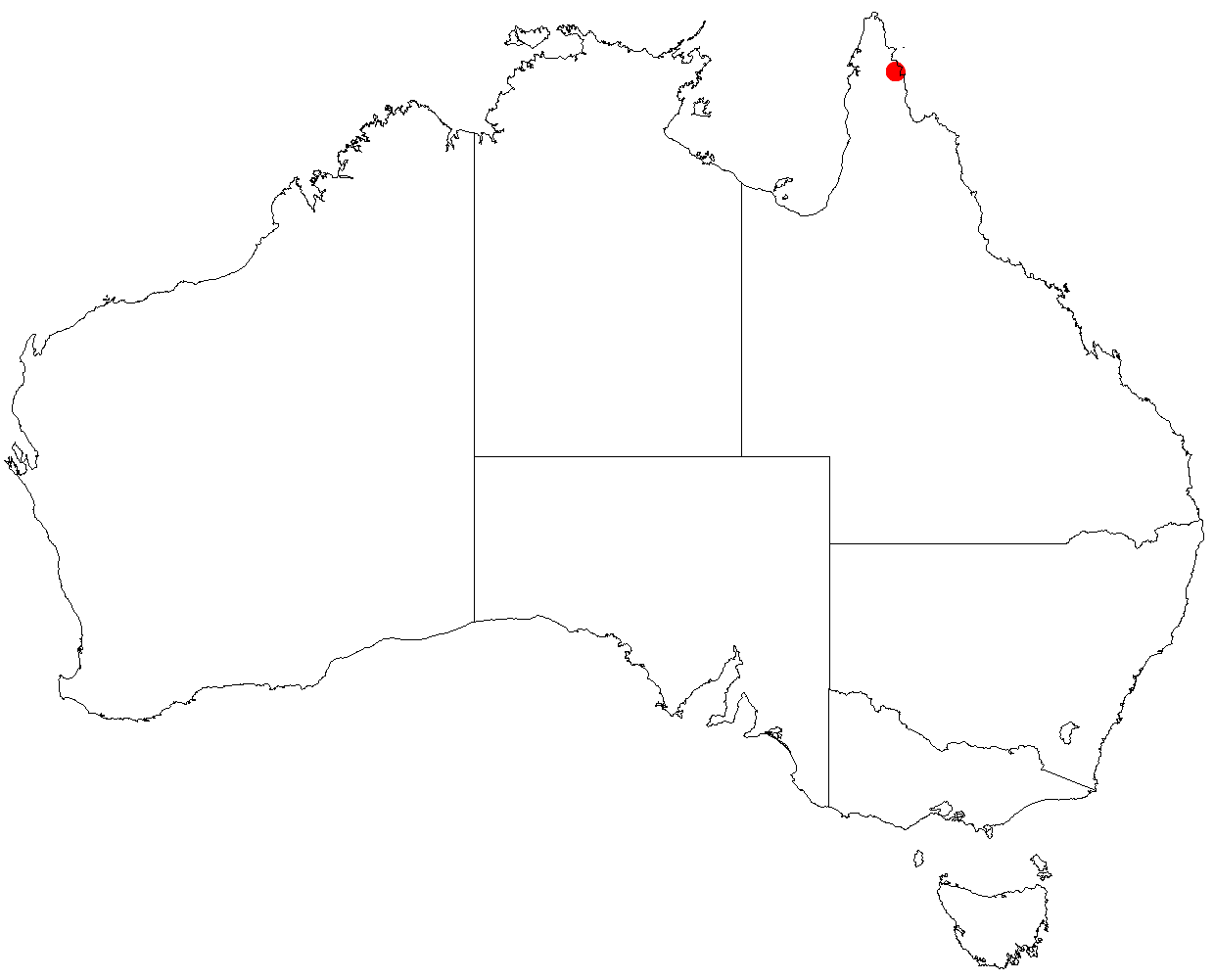
- Occurrence data from AVH

Species of flowering plant

Prostanthera tozerana is a species of flowering plant that is endemic to Mount Tozer in Queensland. It is a small, compact shrub with hairy branchlets, thick egg-shaped leaves with the narrower end towards the base, and pale purplish-mauve flowers.

== Description ==
Prostanthera tozerana is a shrub that typically grows to a height of 0.2–1.5 m (7.9 in – 4 ft 11.1 in) with moderately hairy branches. The leaves are dull green, thick and slightly fleshy, egg-shaped with the narrower end towards the base, 10–15 mm (0.39–0.59 in) long and 5–8 mm (0.20–0.31 in) wide on a petiole 2–3 mm (0.079–0.118 in) long. The flowers are arranged in groups of four to eight near the ends of branchlets, the sepals greenish purple, moderately hairy and form a tube 2–2.5 mm (0.079–0.098 in) long with two lobes, the upper lobe 6.5–7 mm (0.26–0.28 in) long and the lower lobe about 4.5 mm (0.18 in) long. The petals are pale purplish-mauve and 12–15 mm (0.47–0.59 in) long, forming a tube 8.5–9 mm (0.33–0.35 in) long with two lips. The central lower lobe is 6.5–7.5 mm (0.26–0.30 in) long and the side lobes are about 6–7 mm (0.24–0.28 in) long. The upper lip is broadly oblong, 6–6.5 mm (0.24–0.26 in) long and about 6.5 mm (0.26 in) wide with a central notch about 2 mm (0.079 in) deep.

== Taxonomy ==
Prostanthera tozerana was first formally described in 2015 by Barry Conn and Trevor Wilson in the journal Telopea, based on plant material collected on the summit of Mount Tozer.

== Distribution and habitat ==
This mintbush is only known from the summit of Mount Tozer in the Iron Range in far north Queensland, where it grows in exposed situations amongst boulders.

== Conservation status ==
Prostanthera tozerana is classified as "critically endangered" under the Queensland Government Nature Conservation Act 1992.
