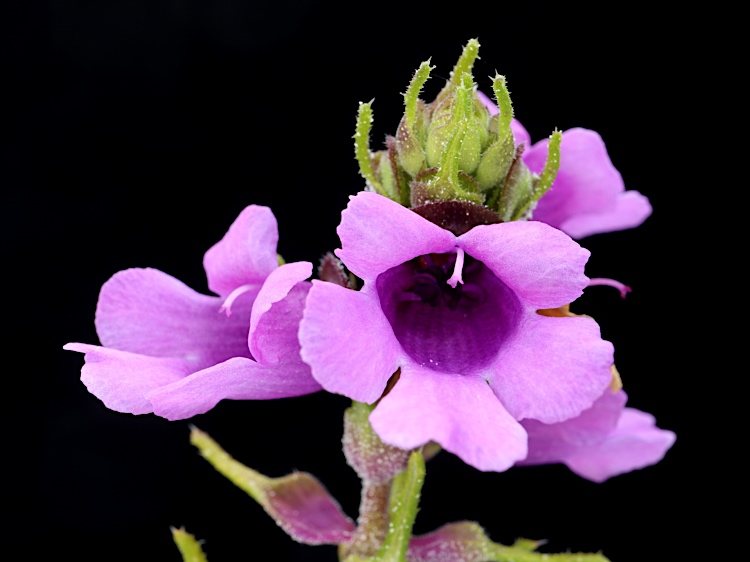

Scientific classification
- Kingdom: Plantae
- Clade: Tracheophytes
- Clade: Angiosperms
- Clade: Eudicots
- Clade: Asterids
- Order: Lamiales
- Family: Lamiaceae
- Genus: Prostanthera
- Species: P. crocodyloides

Binomial name
- Prostanthera crocodyloides T.C.Wilson

= Prostanthera crocodyloides =

Crocodile mint

Species of flowering plant

Prostanthera crocodyloides commonly known as crocodile mint, is a species of flowering plant in the family Lamiaceae and is endemic to New South Wales. It is an upright, aromatic shrub with mauve flowers.

== Description ==
Prostanthera crocodyloides is an open, semi-upright to climbing woody shrub to about 1 m (3 ft 3 in) high. Smaller branches are yellowish green, thickly covered in short, upright and bent hairs to 0.5 mm (0.020 in) long. Leaves are narrowly oval to egg-shaped, 7–24 mm (0.28–0.94 in) long, 1–5 mm (0.039–0.197 in) wide, mid-green, stiff, tooth-like green hairs to 0.3 mm (0.012 in) long and longer hairs along the margin. The mauve flowers are borne in leaf axils, pedicel 1–2.1 mm (0.039–0.083 in) long, calyx tube 1.4–1.9 mm (0.055–0.075 in) long, upper lobe 2.7–3.4 mm (0.11–0.13 in) long, lower lobe 2.7–3.4 mm (0.11–0.13 in) long and corolla 8.5–15 mm (0.33–0.59 in) long.

== Taxonomy and naming ==
Prostanthera crocodyloides was first formally described in 2019 by Trevor Wilson and the description was published in Telopea.The specific epithet (crocodyloides) refers to 'several crocodilian-like qualities on the leaves'.

== Distribution and habitat ==
Crocodile mint grows on slopes, heathy scrubland and woodland in New South Wales.
