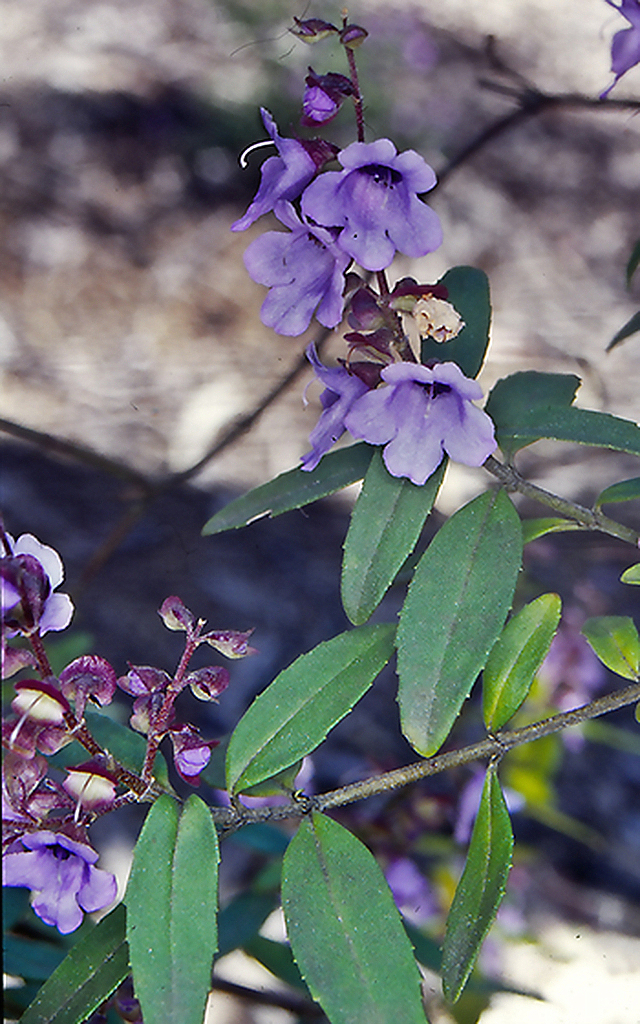
- In the Australian National Botanic Gardens

Scientific classification
- Kingdom: Plantae
- Clade: Tracheophytes
- Clade: Angiosperms
- Clade: Eudicots
- Clade: Asterids
- Order: Lamiales
- Family: Lamiaceae
- Genus: Prostanthera
- Species: P. caerulea

Binomial name
- Prostanthera caerulea R.Br.
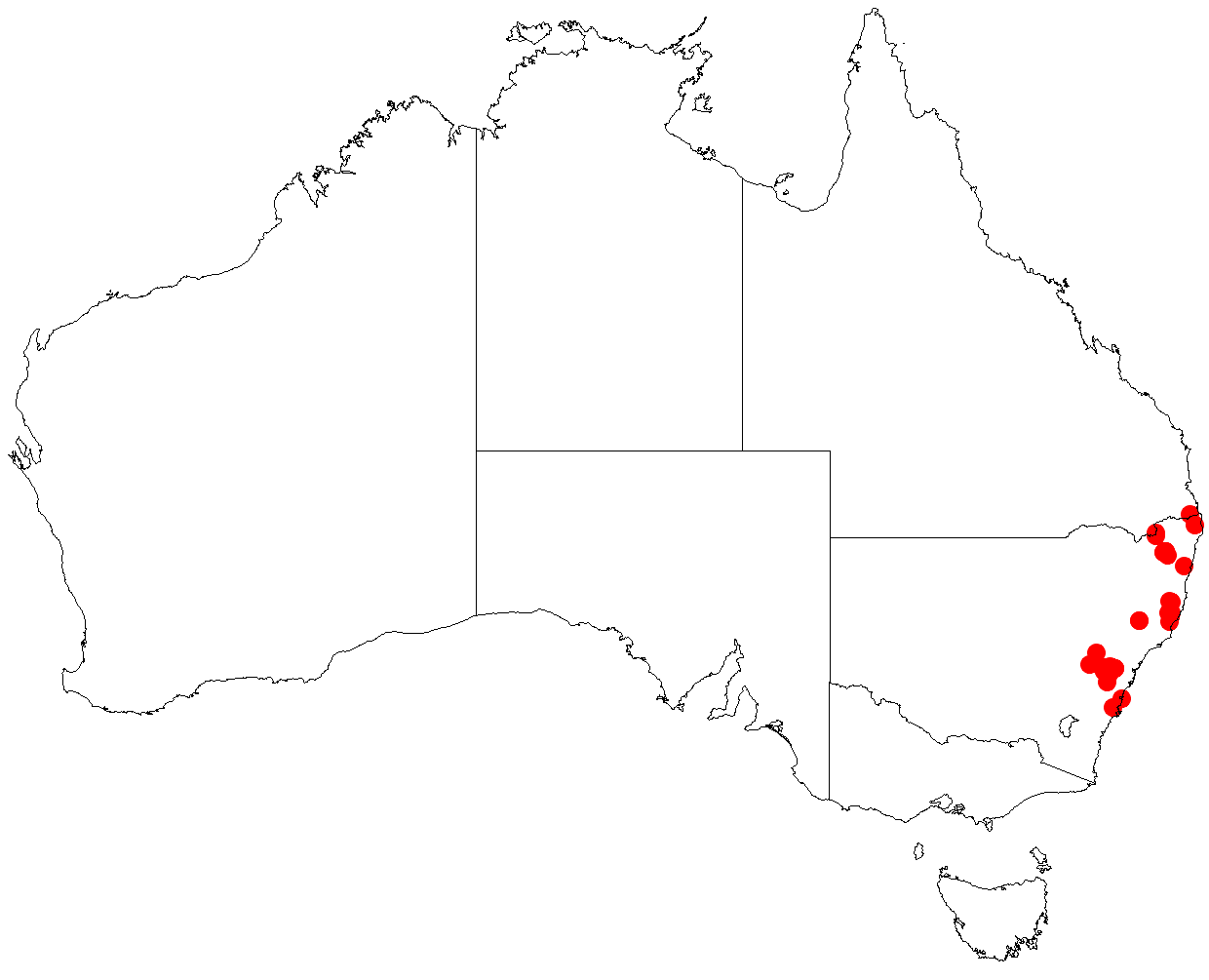
- Occurrence data from AVH

= Prostanthera caerulea =

Lilac mint bush

Species of flowering plant

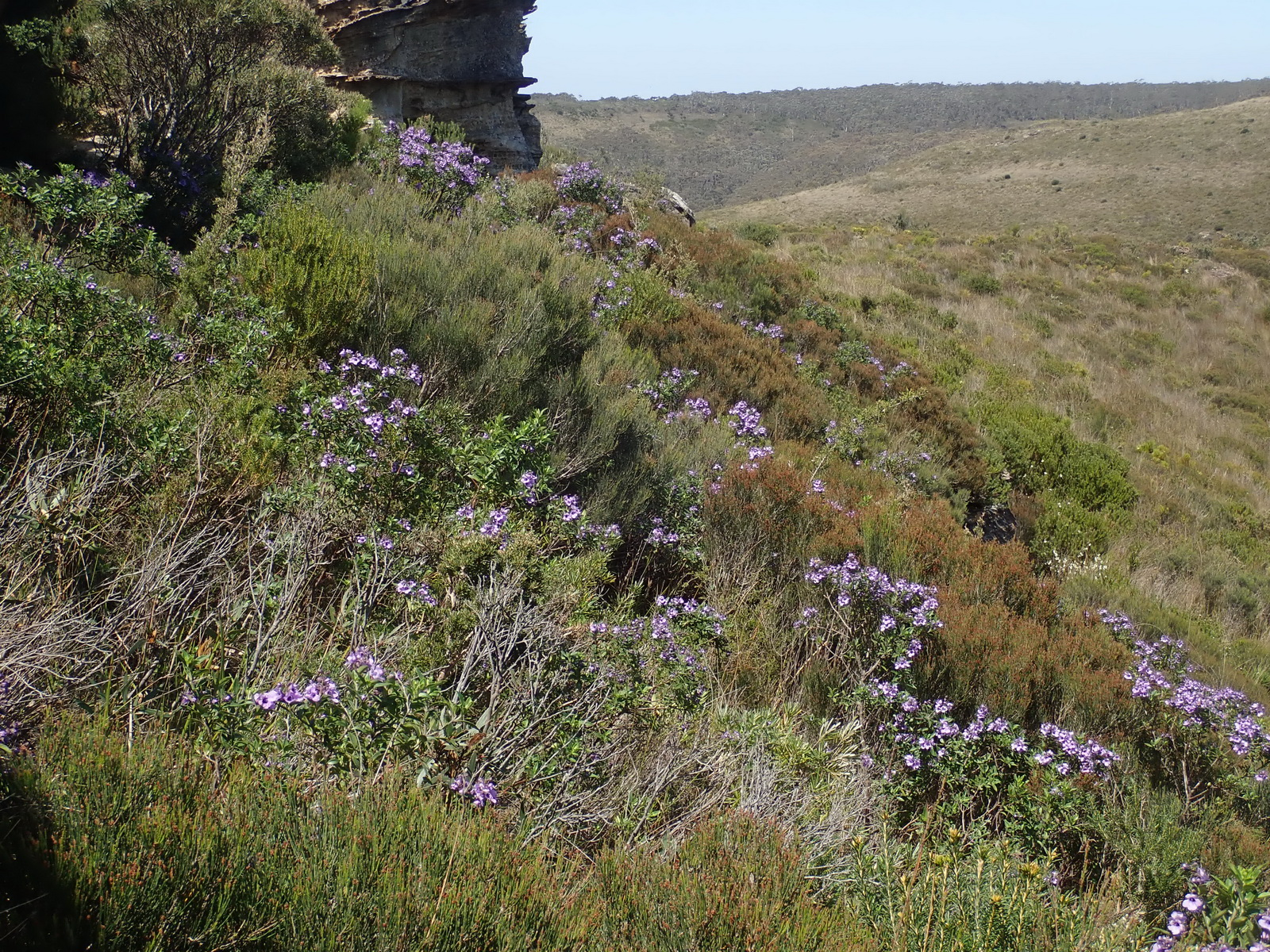
Habit in the Blue Mountains National Park

Prostanthera caerulea, commonly known as lilac mint bush, is a species of flowering plant that is endemic to eastern Australia. It is an erect shrub with narrow egg-shaped leaves that have toothed edges, and white to bluish mauve flowers arranged on the ends of branchlets.

== Description ==
Prostanthera caerulea is an erect shrub that typically grows to a height of 0.5–3 m (1 ft 8 in – 9 ft 10 in) with four-sided branchlets densely covered with glands. Its leaves are narrow egg-shaped, 18–65 mm (0.71–2.56 in) long and 6–22 mm (0.24–0.87 in) wide on a petiole 2–12 mm (0.079–0.472 in) long, and with slightly to strongly toothed edges. The flowers are arranged in groups on the ends of branchlets with bracteoles 2.5–3 mm (0.098–0.118 in) long at the base, but that fall off as the flower develops. The sepals are 4–6 mm (0.16–0.24 in) long forming a tube 2–4 mm (0.079–0.157 in) long with two lobes, the upper lobe 2–3 mm (0.079–0.118 in) long. The petals are 10–12 mm (0.39–0.47 in) long, forming a white to bluish-mauve tube. Flowering occurs from September to November.

== Taxonomy and naming ==
Prostanthera caerulea was first formally described in 1810 by Robert Brown in Prodromus Florae Novae Hollandiae et Insulae Van Diemen.

== Distribution and habitat ==
Lilac mint bush grows in heath and forest on sandy soil from south-east Queensland to Wollongong in New South Wales.
