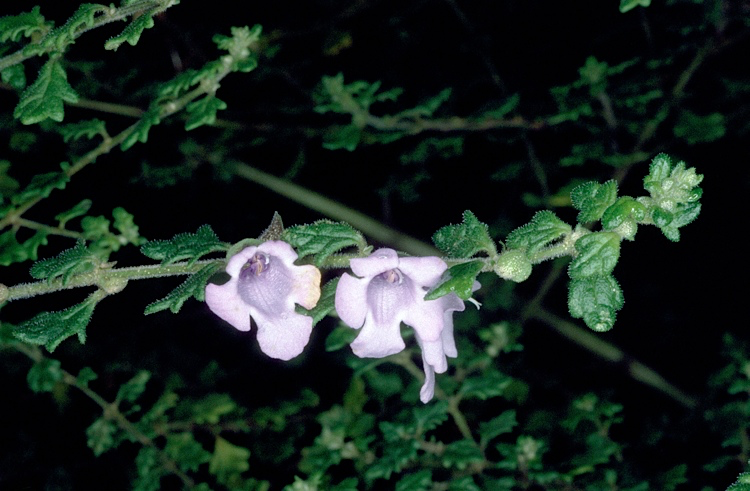

Scientific classification
- Kingdom: Plantae
- Clade: Tracheophytes
- Clade: Angiosperms
- Clade: Eudicots
- Clade: Asterids
- Order: Lamiales
- Family: Lamiaceae
- Genus: Prostanthera
- Species: P. rugosa

Binomial name
- Prostanthera rugosa A.Cunn. ex Benth.
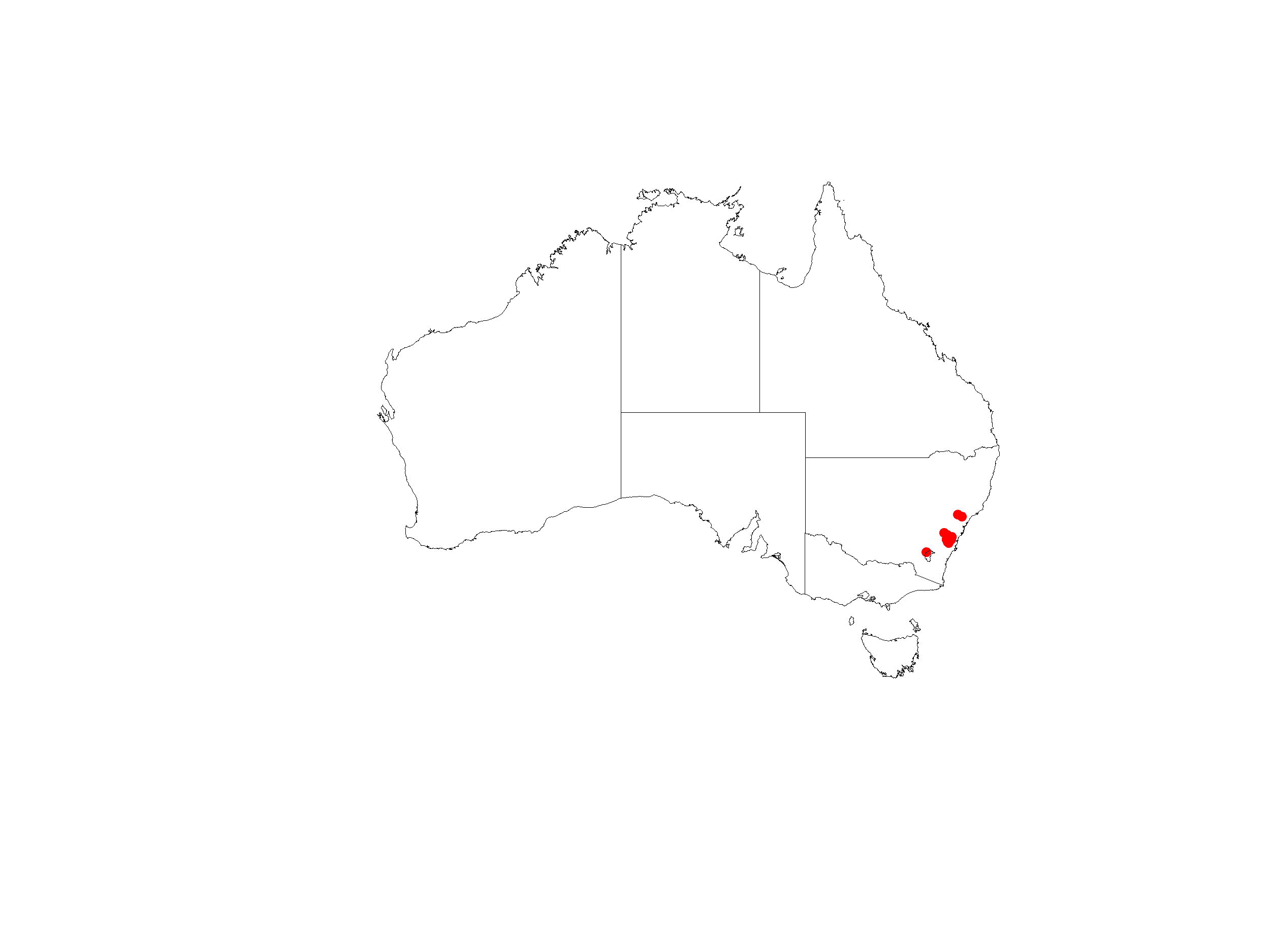
- Occurrence data from AVH

= Prostanthera rugosa =

Species of flowering plant

Prostanthera rugosa is a species of flowering plant in the family Lamiaceae and is endemic to a restricted area of New South Wales. It is an openly-branched shrub with egg-shaped or narrow egg-shaped, thick, fleshy leaves and mauve flowers with a white tinge arranged in leaf axils near the ends of branchlets.

== Description ==
Prostanthera rugosa is an openly-branched shrub that grows to a height of 1–1.5 mm (0.039–0.059 in) with branches that are densely hairy, at least when young and have more or less sessile glands. The leaves are egg-shaped to narrow egg-shaped, hairy on the upper surface, have two or three lobes on each side, 3–9 mm (0.12–0.35 in) long and 2–5 mm (0.079–0.197 in) wide on a petiole 0.5–2 mm (0.020–0.079 in) long. The flowers are arranged in leaf axils near the ends of branches with bracteoles less than 0.5 mm (0.020 in) long at the base. The sepals are 4–5 mm (0.16–0.20 in) long forming a tube 2–3 mm (0.079–0.118 in) long with two lobes, the upper lobe 2–3 mm (0.079–0.118 in) long. The petals are mauve with a white tinge, 10–13 mm (0.39–0.51 in) long. Flowering occurs from September to October.

== Taxonomy ==
Prostanthera rugosa was first formally described in 1834 by George Bentham from an unpublished description by Alan Cunningham, of plants collected "on rugged mountains near the Hunter River". Bentham's description was published in his book Labiatarum Genera et Species.

== Distribution and habitat ==
This mintbush grows in forest in the Moss Vale district of New South Wales.
