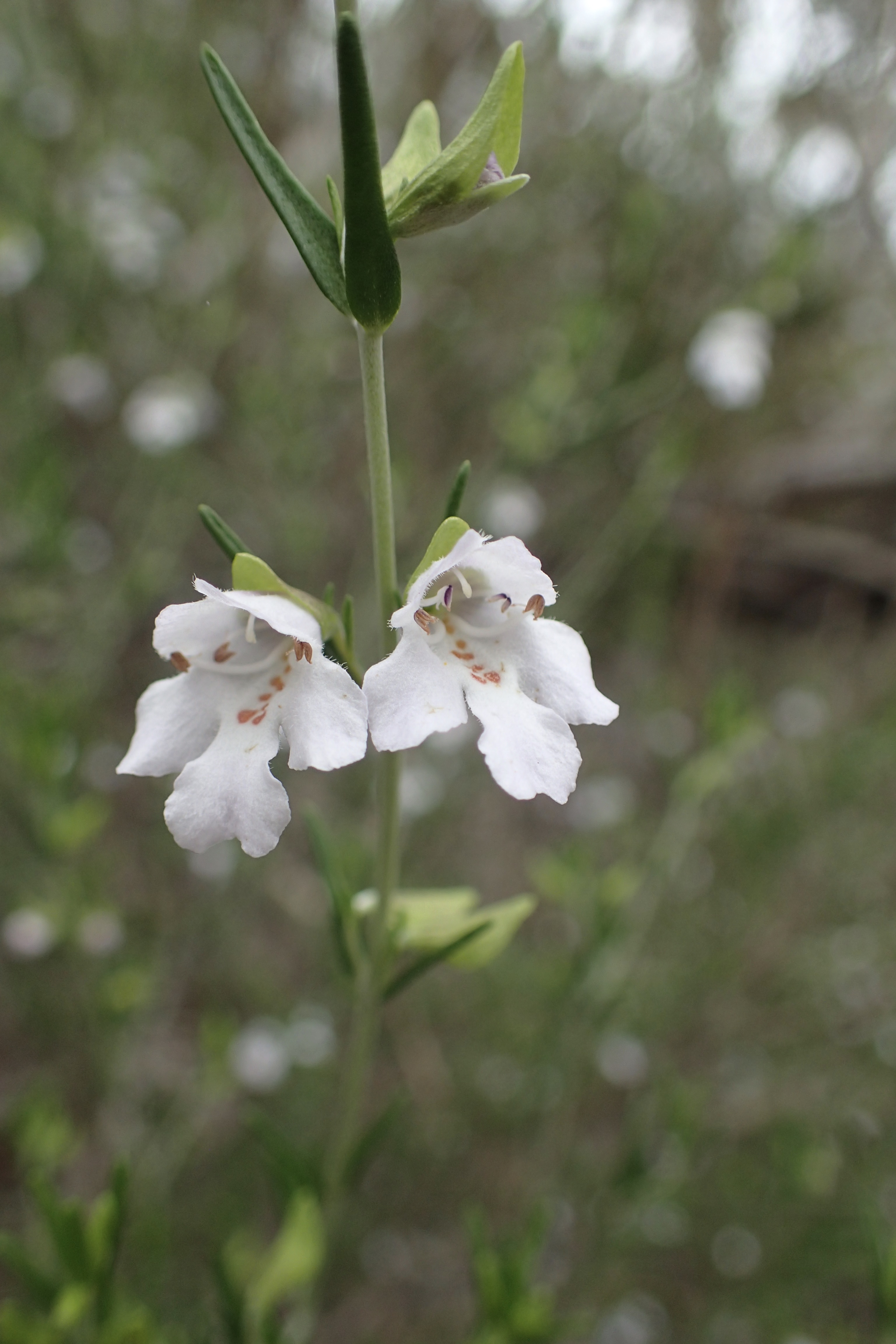

Scientific classification
- Kingdom: Plantae
- Clade: Tracheophytes
- Clade: Angiosperms
- Clade: Eudicots
- Clade: Asterids
- Order: Lamiales
- Family: Lamiaceae
- Genus: Prostanthera
- Species: P. baxteri

Binomial name
- Prostanthera baxteri A.Cunn. ex Benth.
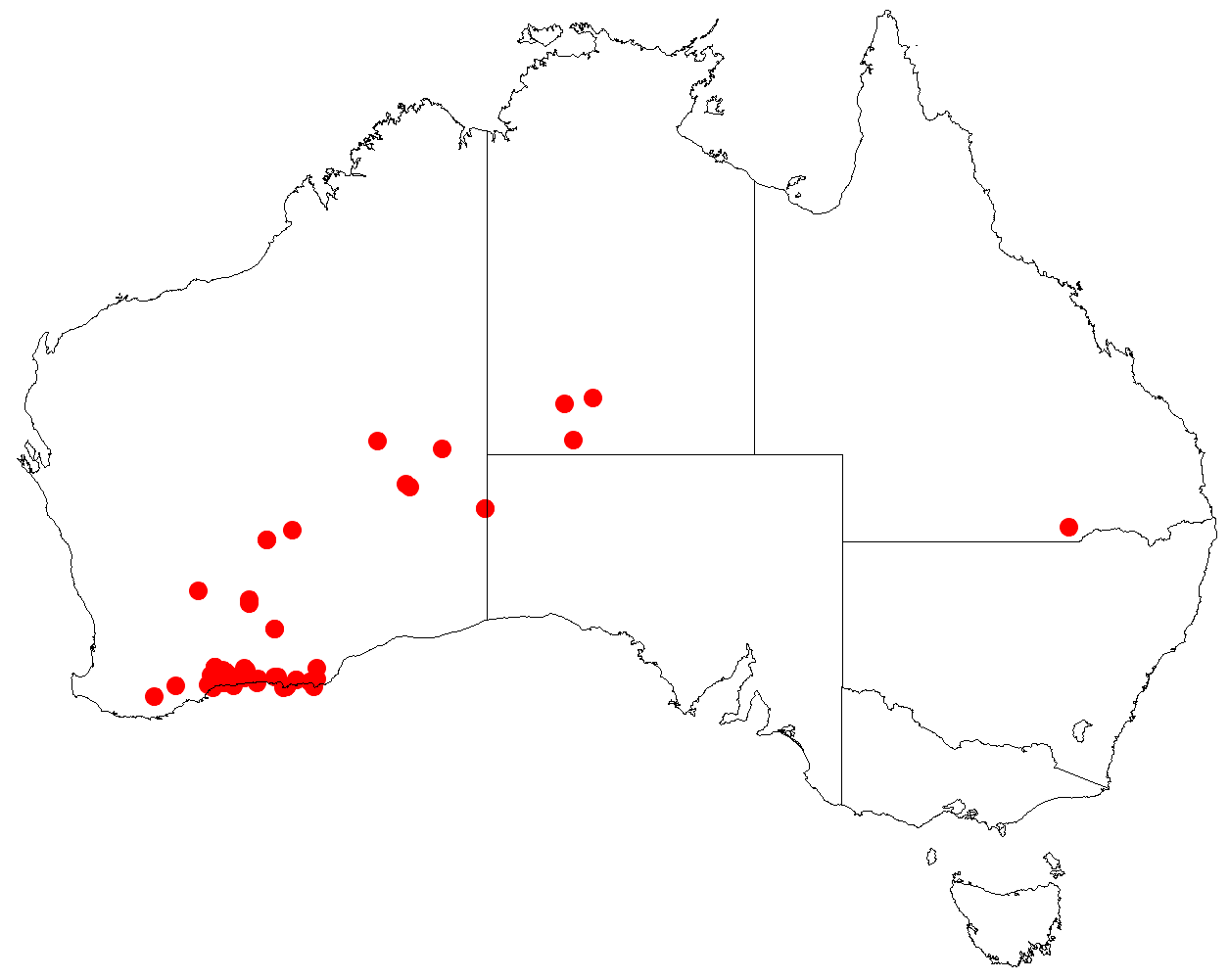
- Occurrence data from AVH

Synonyms
- Prostanthera baxteri A.Cunn. ex Benth. var. baxteri; Prostanthera baxteri var. crassifolia Benth.

= Prostanthera baxteri =

Species of flowering plant

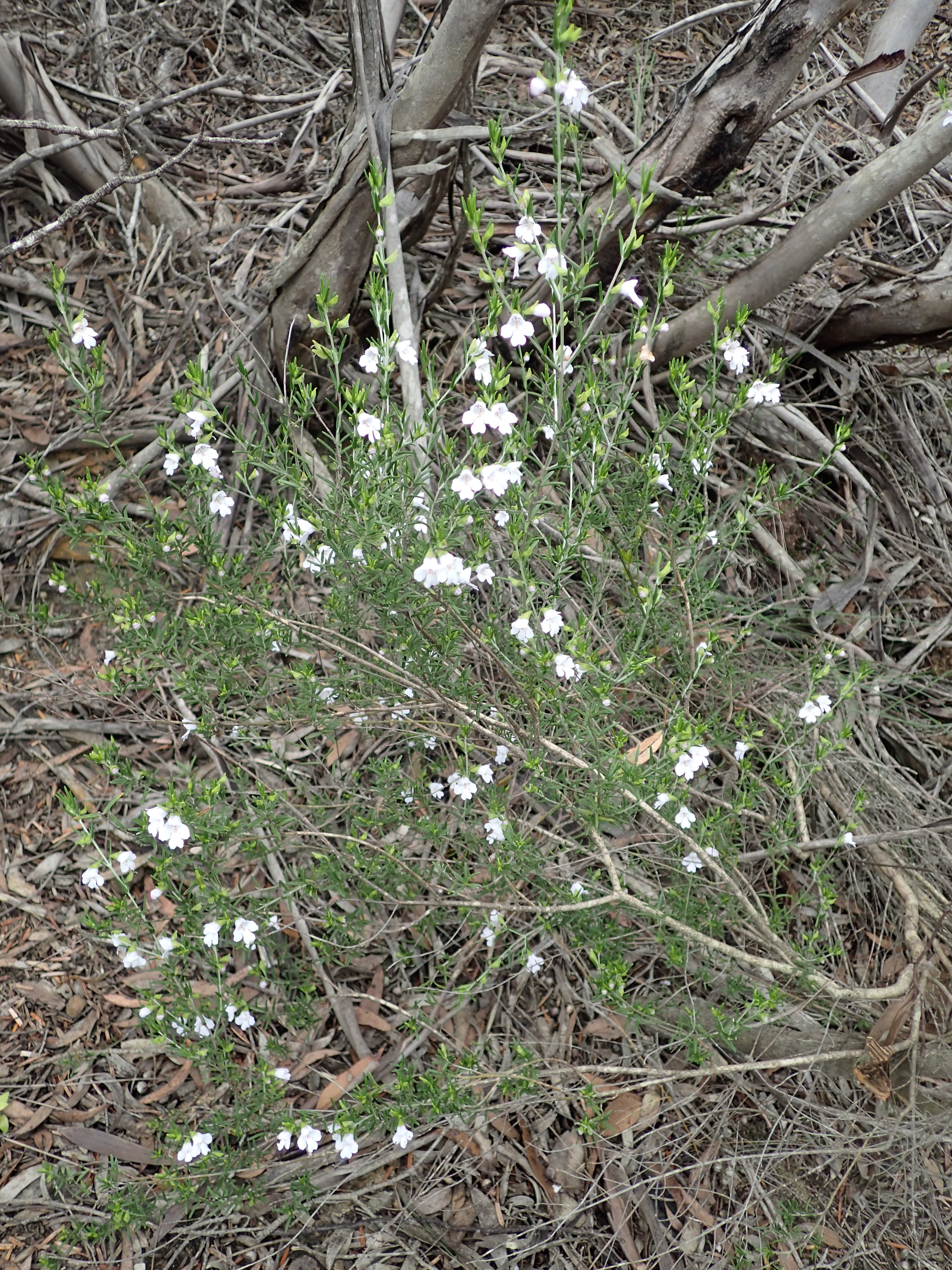
Habit near Hopetoun

Prostanthera baxteri is a species of flowering plant in the family Lamiaceae and is endemic to the south-east of Western Australia. It is an erect shrub with narrow egg-shaped to linear leaves and white flowers with a tinge of blue to pale mauve.

== Description ==
Prostanthera baxteri is an erect shrub that typically grows to a height of 0.3–1.3 m (1 ft 0 in – 4 ft 3 in) with stems that usually appear white because of their dense covering of white hairs. The leaves are narrow egg-shaped to linear, light green, 5–15 mm (0.20–0.59 in) long, 1–2 mm (0.039–0.079 in) wide and sessile. The flowers are arranged singly on the ends of branchlets in eight to fourteen leaf axils, each flower on a pedicel 1–3 mm (0.039–0.118 in) long. The sepals are green with a maroon tinge and form a tube 2–4 mm (0.079–0.157 in) long with two lobes, the lower lobe 3–4.5 mm (0.12–0.18 in) long and the upper lobe 1.5–3 mm (0.059–0.118 in) long. The petals are white with a tinge of blue to pale mauve, 10.5–13 mm (0.41–0.51 in) and fused to form a tube 4.5–7.5 mm (0.18–0.30 in) long. The lower lip has three lobes, the centre lobe spatula-shaped, 2.4–5.5 mm (0.094–0.217 in) long and 2–5.5 mm (0.079–0.217 in) wide and the side lobes 2–4.5 mm (0.079–0.177 in) long and 2–4 mm (0.079–0.157 in) wide. The upper lip has two lobes 2–3 mm (0.079–0.118 in) long and about 2–6 mm (0.079–0.236 in) wide. Flowering occurs from August to November.

== Taxonomy ==
Prostanthera baxteri was first formally described in 1834 by George Bentham in his book Labiatarum genera et species, from an unpublished description by Allan Cunningham. The type specimens were collected near King George Sound.

== Distribution and habitat ==
This mintbush grows on granite outcrops, rocky places and sandplains in mallee and heath communities in the Esperance Plains and Mallee biogeographic regions in the south of Western Australia.

== Conservation status ==
Prostanthera baxteri is classified as "not threatened" by the Western Australian Government Department of Parks and Wildlife.
