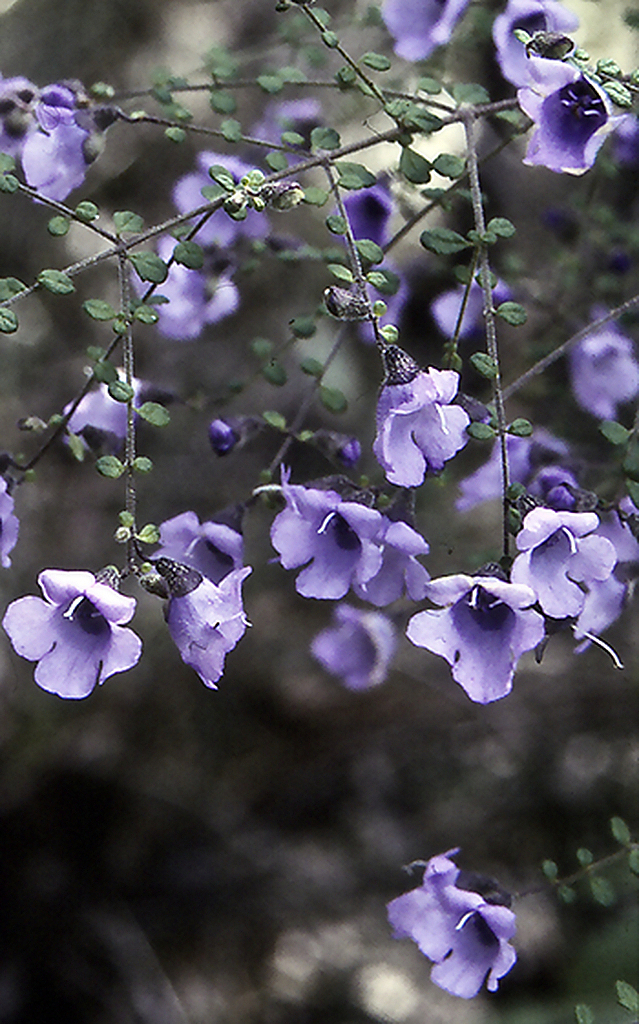
- In Conjola National Park

Scientific classification
- Kingdom: Plantae
- Clade: Tracheophytes
- Clade: Angiosperms
- Clade: Eudicots
- Clade: Asterids
- Order: Lamiales
- Family: Lamiaceae
- Genus: Prostanthera
- Species: P. violacea

Binomial name
- Prostanthera violacea R.Br.
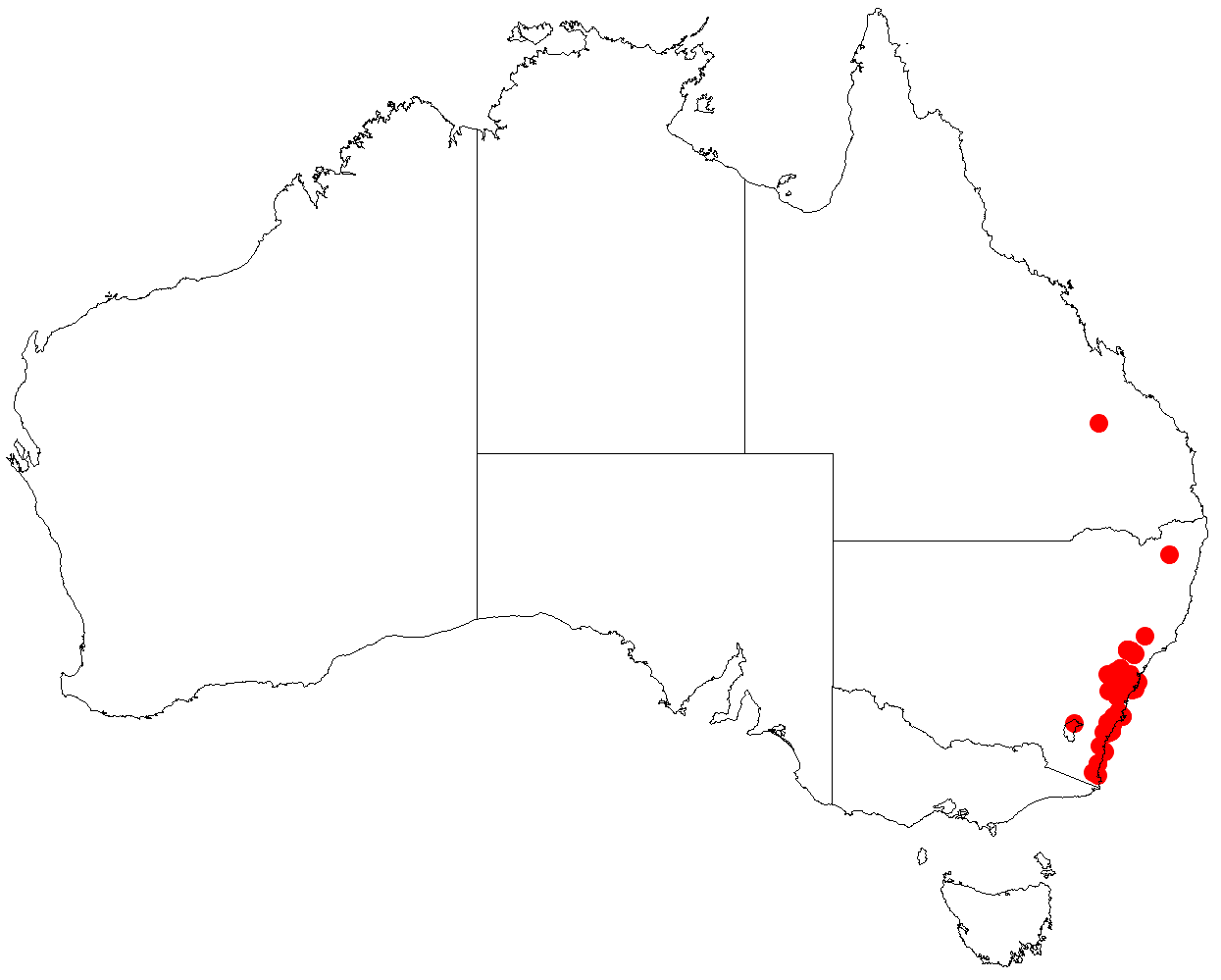
- Occurrence data from AVH

= Prostanthera violacea =

Violet mint-bush

Species of flowering plant

Prostanthera violacea, commonly known as violet mint-bush, is a species of flowering plant in the family Lamiaceae and is endemic to south-eastern New South Wales. It is a slender, strongly aromatic shrub with densely hairy branches, more or less round leaves with the edges rolled under and mauve to bluish flowers often with white tips.

== Description ==
Prostanthera violacea is a slender, strongly aromatic shrub that typically grows to a height of 0.5–2 m (1 ft 8 in – 6 ft 7 in) and has densely hairy branches. The leaves are more or less round but usually appear egg-shaped because the edges are rolled under. The leaves are 2–6 mm (0.079–0.236 in) long and wide on a petiole 0.3–1 mm (0.012–0.039 in) long. The flowers are borne singly in leaf axils, each flower with bracteoles 1.5–2 mm (0.059–0.079 in) long under the sepals. The sepals are 4–5 mm (0.16–0.20 in) long forming a tube 1.5–2 mm (0.059–0.079 in) long with two lobes, the upper lobe about 2 mm (0.079 in) long. The petals are mauve to bluish, often with white tips, 7–8 mm (0.28–0.31 in) long. Flowering occurs in spring.

== Taxonomy ==
Prostanthera violacea was formally described in 1810 by Robert Brown in his treatise Prodromus Florae Novae Hollandiae et Insulae Van Diemen.

== Distribution and habitat ==
Violet mint-bush grows in forest, including rainforest, often in gullies or near watercourses, and is found on the coast and tablelands of south-eastern New South Wales.
