= Prostanthera canaliculata =

Scientific classification
- Kingdom: Plantae
- Clade: Tracheophytes
- Clade: Angiosperms
- Clade: Eudicots
- Clade: Asterids
- Order: Lamiales
- Family: Lamiaceae
- Genus: Prostanthera
- Species: P. canaliculata

Binomial name
- Prostanthera canaliculata F.Muell.
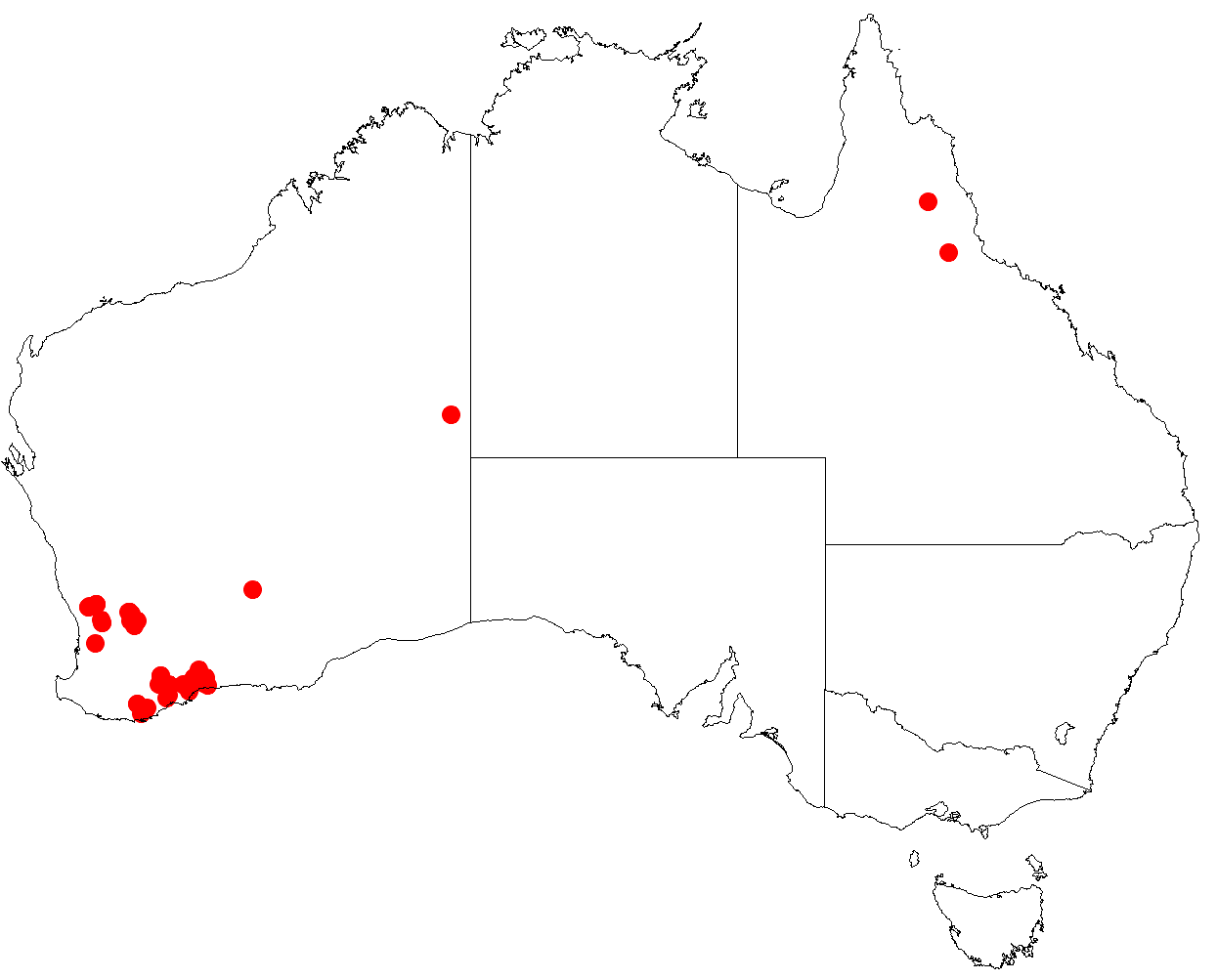
- Occurrence data from AVH

Synonyms
- Prostanthera canaliculata F.Muell. var. canaliculata

Species of flowering plant

Prostanthera canaliculata is a species of flowering plant in the family Lamiaceae and is endemic to the south-west of Western Australia. It is a small, erect shrub with hairy branchlets, narrow egg-shaped to narrow elliptical leaves and pale blue or pale violet to white flowers with no markings.

== Description ==
Prostanthera canaliculata is an erect shrub that typically grows to a height of 0.3–0.7 m (1 ft 0 in – 2 ft 4 in) and has branchlets that are usually whitish due to a dense covering of white hairs. The leaves are narrow egg-shaped to narrow elliptical, densely hairy, silvery green or green, 4–7 mm (0.16–0.28 in) long, 1.0–1.5 mm (0.039–0.059 in) wide and sessile or on a petiole up to 0.5 mm (0.020 in) long. The flowers are arranged singly in two to sixteen leaf axils near the ends of branchlets, each flower on a pedicel 1–1.5 mm (0.039–0.059 in) long. The sepals are green with a mauve to purple tinge and form a tube 2–3 mm (0.079–0.118 in) long with two lobes, the lower lobe 1.5–2 mm (0.059–0.079 in) long and the upper lobe 1–1.5 mm (0.039–0.059 in) long. The petals are pale blue or pale violet to white without markings, 6.5–10 mm (0.26–0.39 in) and fused to form a tube 3–7 mm (0.12–0.28 in) long. The lower lip has three lobes, the centre lobe spatula-shaped, 3–5 mm (0.12–0.20 in) long and 3–5 mm (0.12–0.20 in) wide and the side lobes 2–4 mm (0.079–0.157 in) long and 1–3 mm (0.039–0.118 in) wide. The upper lip has two lobes 1.5–3.5 mm (0.059–0.138 in) long and 3.5–5 mm (0.14–0.20 in) wide. Flowering occurs from September to November.

== Taxonomy ==
Prostanthera canaliculata was first formally described in 1868 by Ferdinand von Mueller in his book Fragmenta phytographiae Australiae.

== Distribution and habitat ==
This mintbush grows on sandy rises, sandplains and on granite outcrops in the Avon Wheatbelt, Esperance Plains, Jarrah Forest, Mallee and Swan Coastal Plain biographic regions of Western Australia.

== Conservation status ==
Prostanthera canaliculata is classified as "not threatened" by the Western Australian Government Department of Parks and Wildlife.
