= Prostanthera petrophila =

Conservation status
- Priority Three — Poorly Known Taxa (DEC)

Scientific classification
- Kingdom: Plantae
- Clade: Tracheophytes
- Clade: Angiosperms
- Clade: Eudicots
- Clade: Asterids
- Order: Lamiales
- Family: Lamiaceae
- Genus: Prostanthera
- Species: P. petrophila

Binomial name
- Prostanthera petrophila B.J.Conn
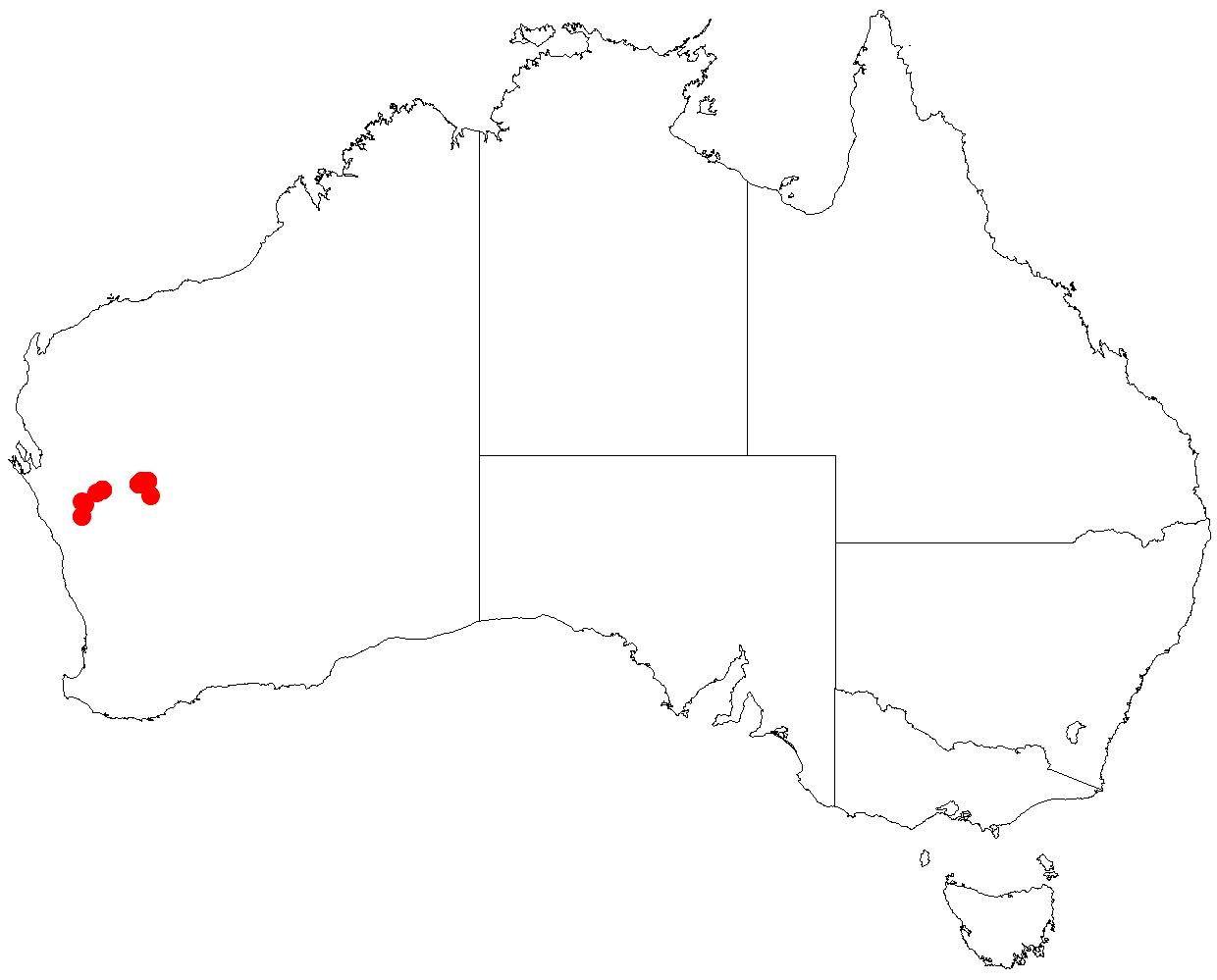
- Occurrence data from AVH

Species of flowering plant

Prostanthera petrophila is a species of flowering plant in the family Lamiaceae and is endemic to Western Australia. It is a spreading shrub with densely hairy branches, narrow egg-shaped leaves with the narrower end towards the base and white flowers with violet striations in the petal tube.

== Description ==
Prostanthera petrophila is a spreading shrub that typically grows to a height of 0.6–1.5 m (2 ft 0 in – 4 ft 11 in) and has densely hairy branches. The leaves are more or less glabrous, narrow egg-shaped with the narrower end towards the base, 8.5–14 mm (0.33–0.55 in) long and 2–3 mm (0.079–0.118 in) wide on a short petiole. The flowers are arranged in groups of about ten to sixteen on the ends of branchlets, each flower on a pedicel 2–2.5 mm (0.079–0.098 in) long. The sepals form a tube 2–4 mm (0.079–0.157 in) long with two lobes, the lower lobe 1–1.5 mm (0.039–0.059 in) long and the upper lobe 3–3.5 mm (0.12–0.14 in) long. The petals are white with violet striations in the tube and on the lobes, 5–6 mm (0.20–0.24 in) long and form a tube 4–5 mm (0.16–0.20 in) long. The lower lip of the petal tube has three lobes, the centre lobe spatula-shaped, 3–5 mm (0.12–0.20 in) long and the side lobes 4.5–5 mm (0.18–0.20 in) long. The upper lip is 5–6 mm (0.20–0.24 in) long, 7–8 mm (0.28–0.31 in) wide with a central notch 3–3.5 mm (0.12–0.14 in) deep. Flowering occurs in August.

== Taxonomy ==
Prostanthera petrophila was first formally described in 1988 by Barry Conn in the journal Nuytsia from specimens collected near Mount Barloweerie in 1931.

== Distribution and habitat ==
This mintbush grows on laterite and in rock crevices in the Murchison and Yalgoo biogeographic regions of Western Australia.

== Conservation status ==
Prostanthera petrophila is classified as "Priority Three" by the Government of Western Australia Department of Parks and Wildlife meaning that it is poorly known and known from only a few locations but is not under imminent threat.
