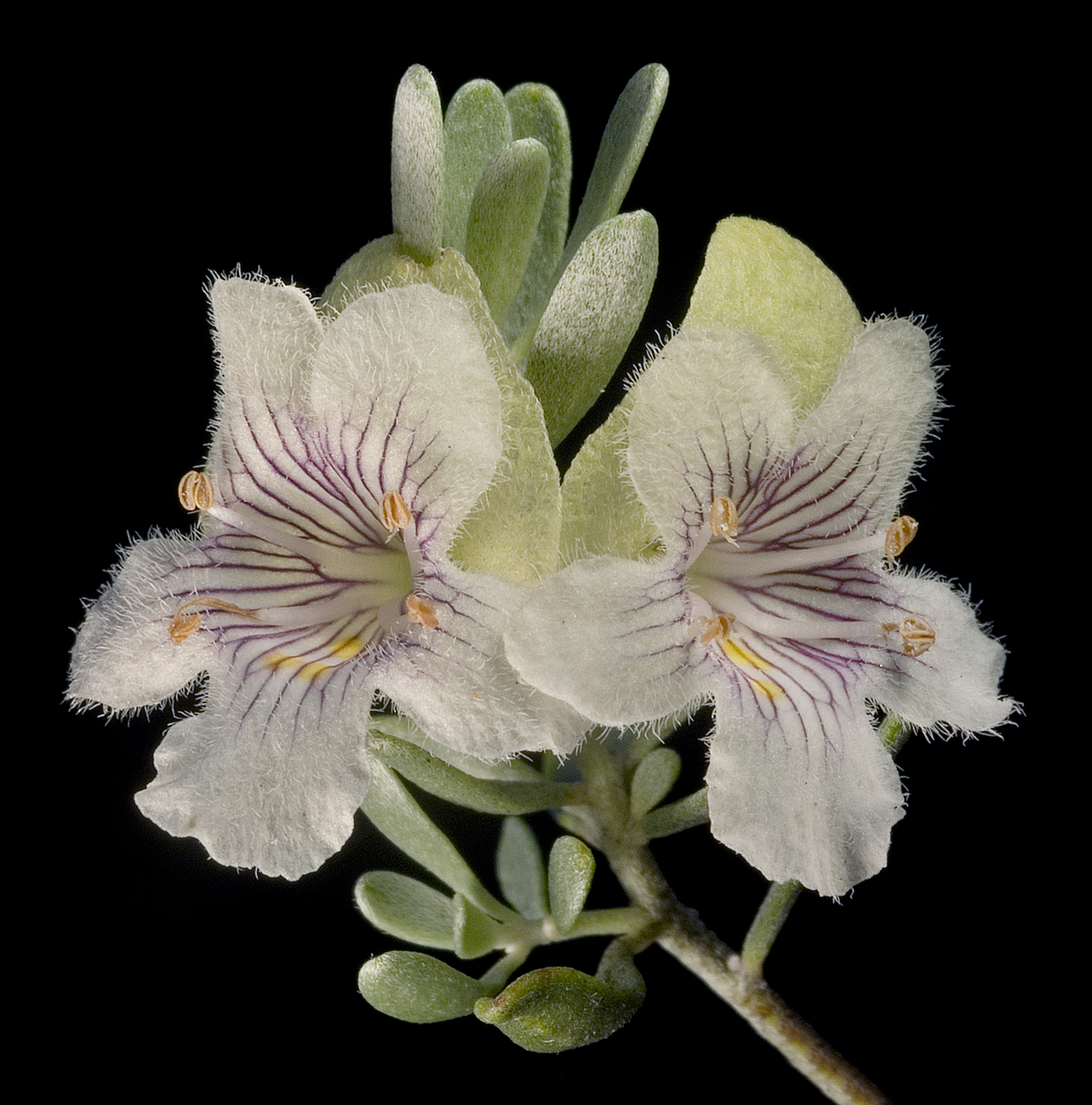
- Prostanthera althoferi

Scientific classification
- Kingdom: Plantae
- Clade: Tracheophytes
- Clade: Angiosperms
- Clade: Eudicots
- Clade: Asterids
- Order: Lamiales
- Family: Lamiaceae
- Subfamily: Prostantheroideae
- Genus: Prostanthera; Labill.

Species
- See text

Synonyms
- Cryphia R.Br.; Eichlerago Carrick; Klanderia F.Muell.; Prostanthera sect. Euprostanthera Benth. nom. inval.; Wrixonia F.Muell.

= Prostanthera =

Genus of plants

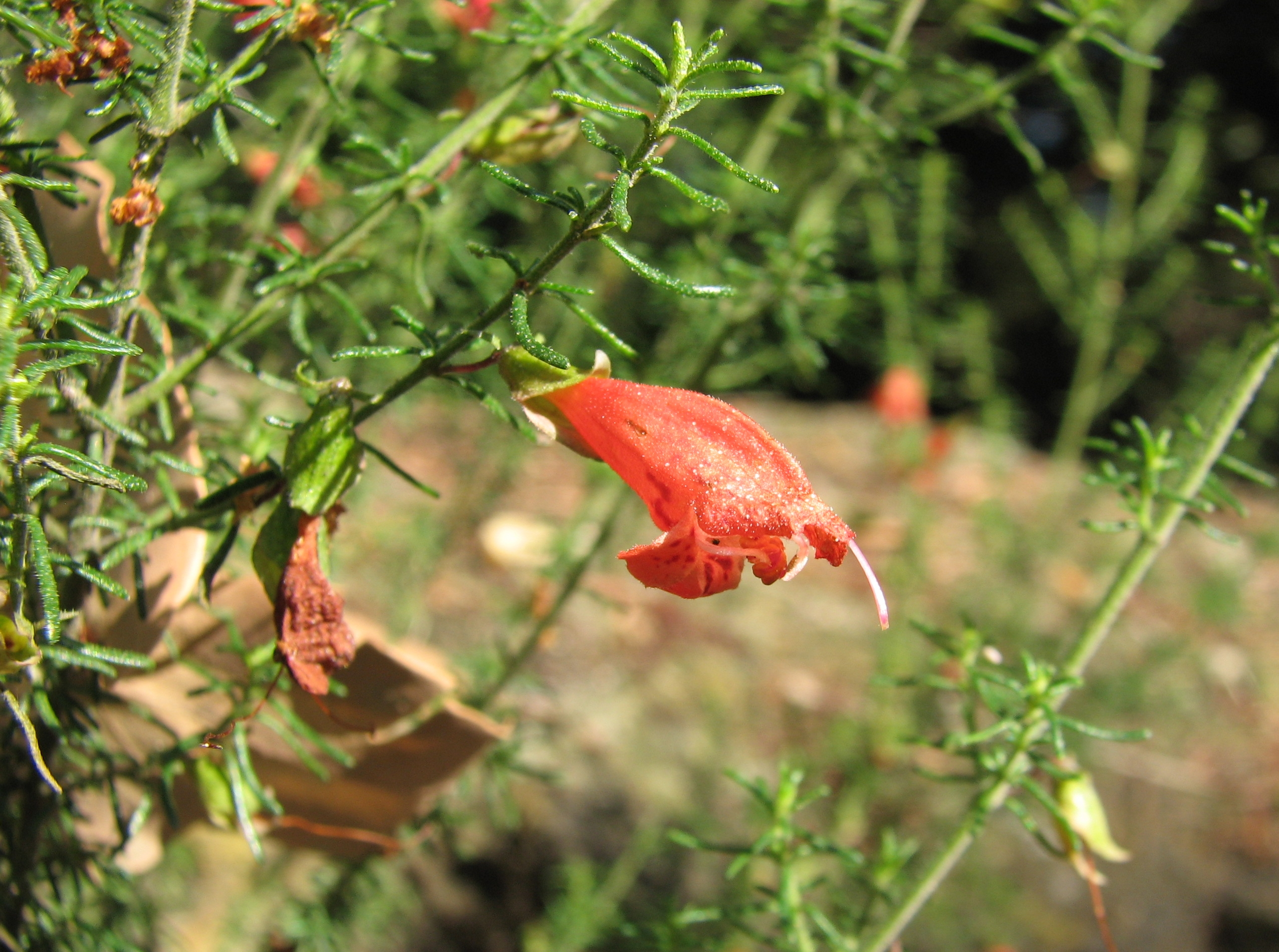
Prostanthera aspalathoides

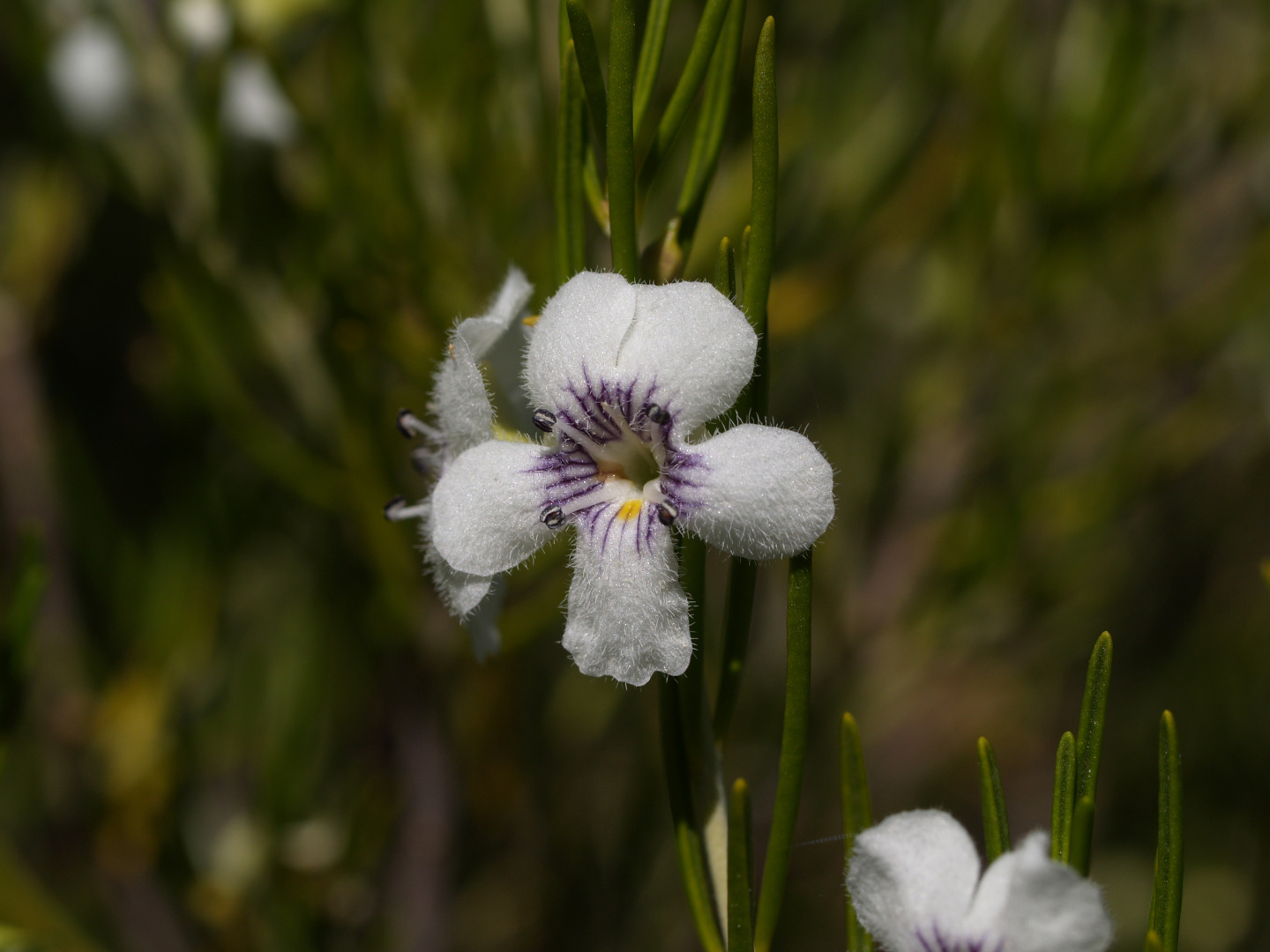
Prostanthera campbellii

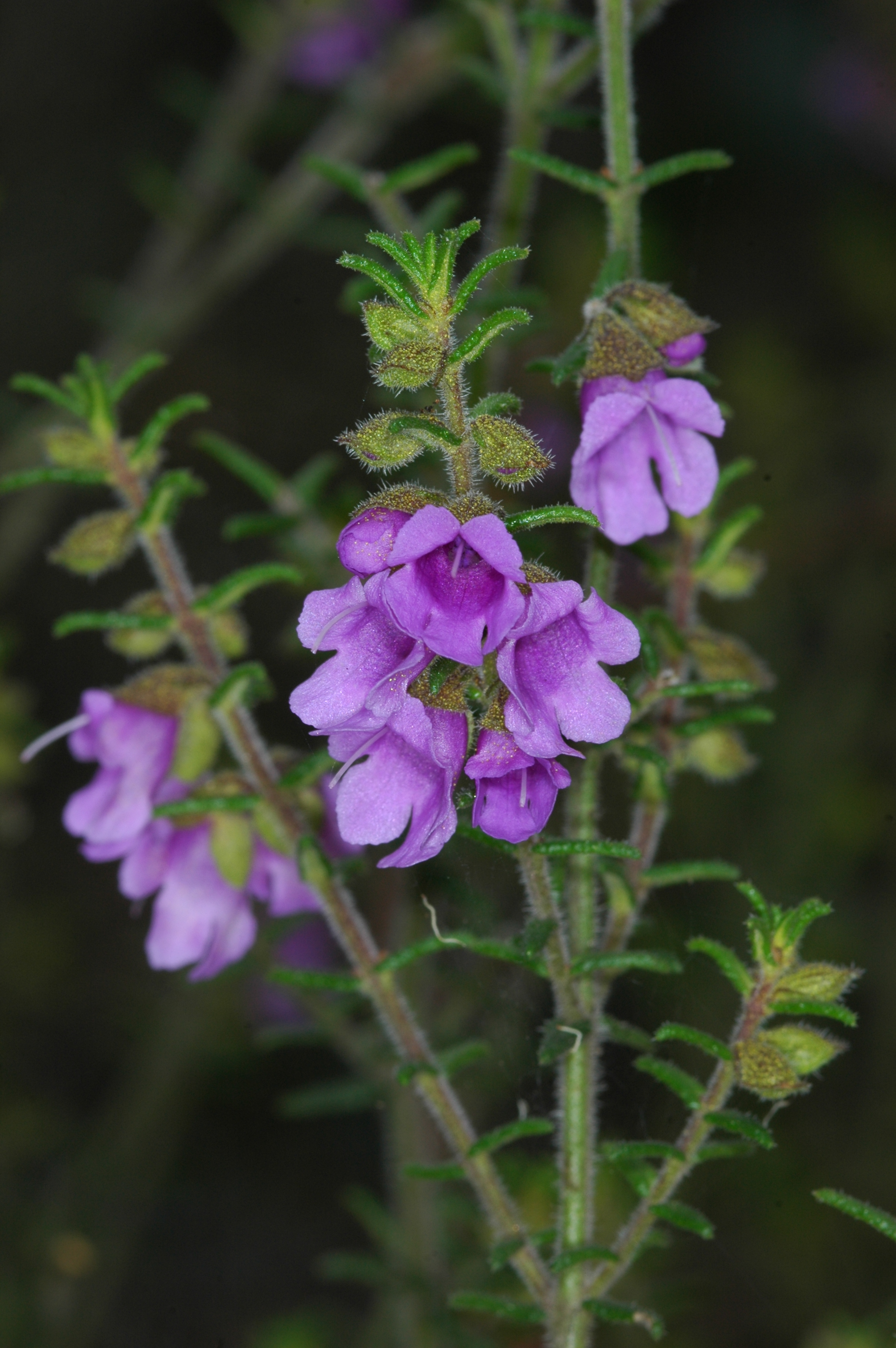
Prostanthera decussata

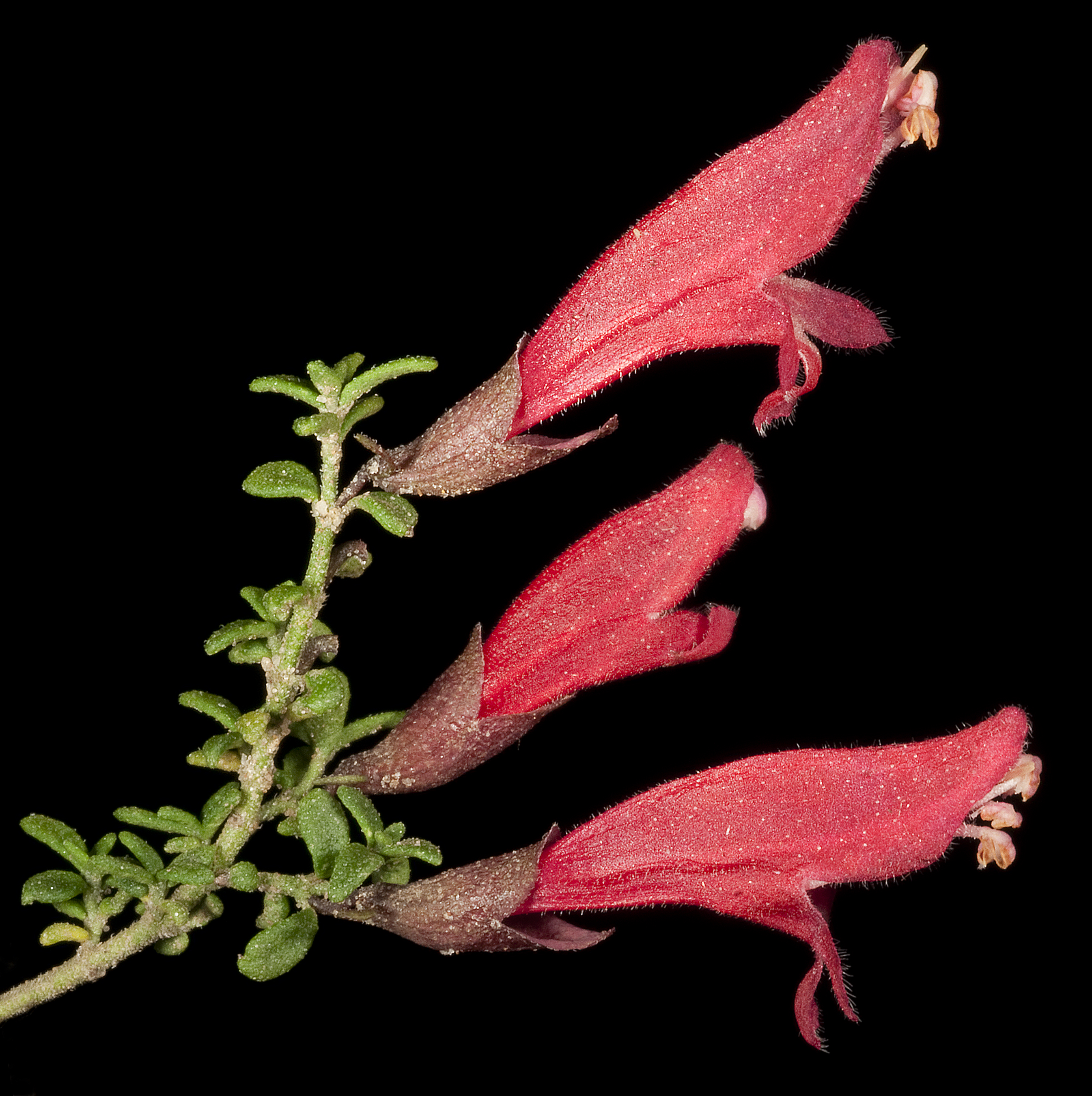
Prostanthera grylloana

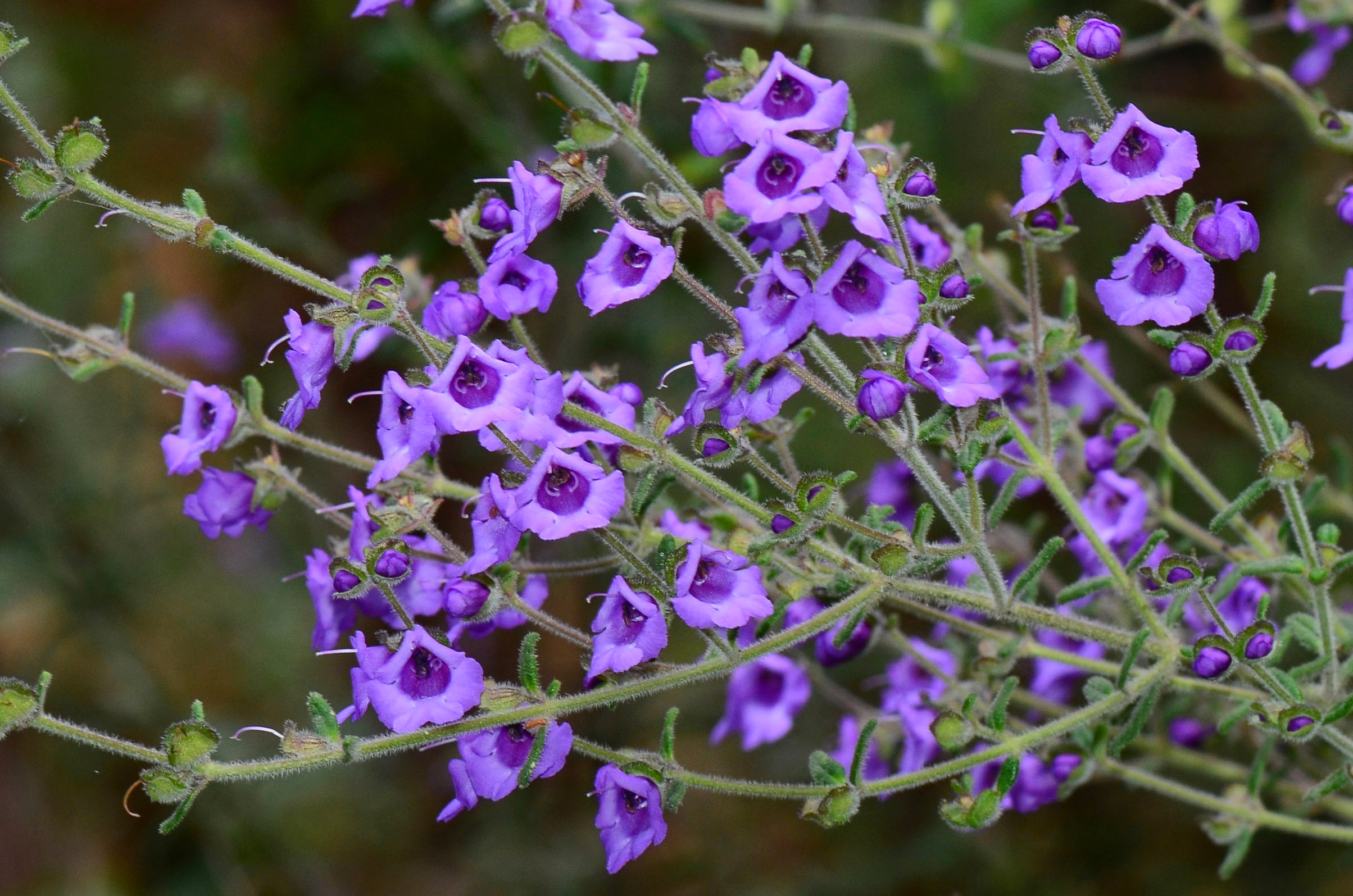
Prostanthera hirtula

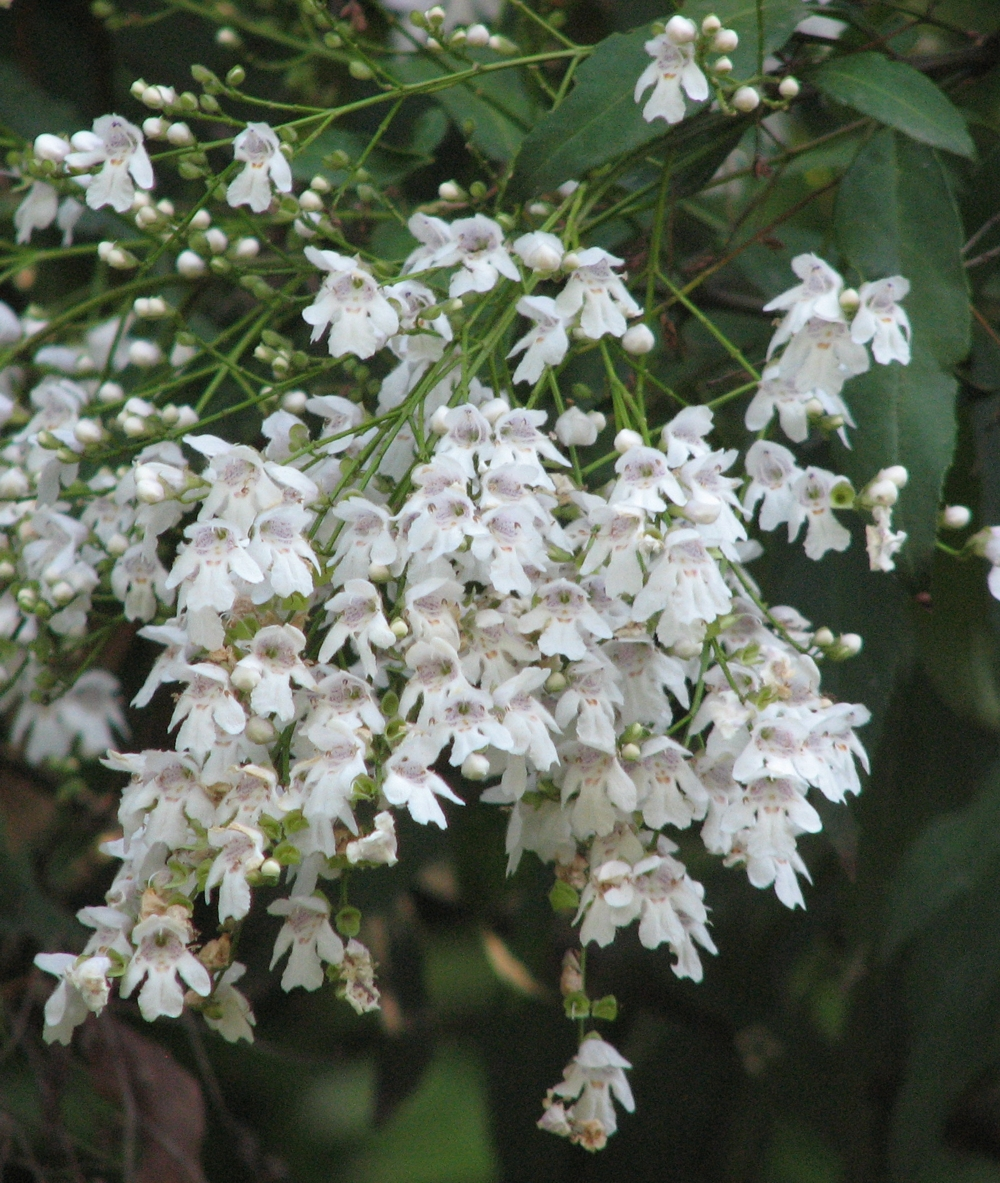
Prostanthera lasianthos

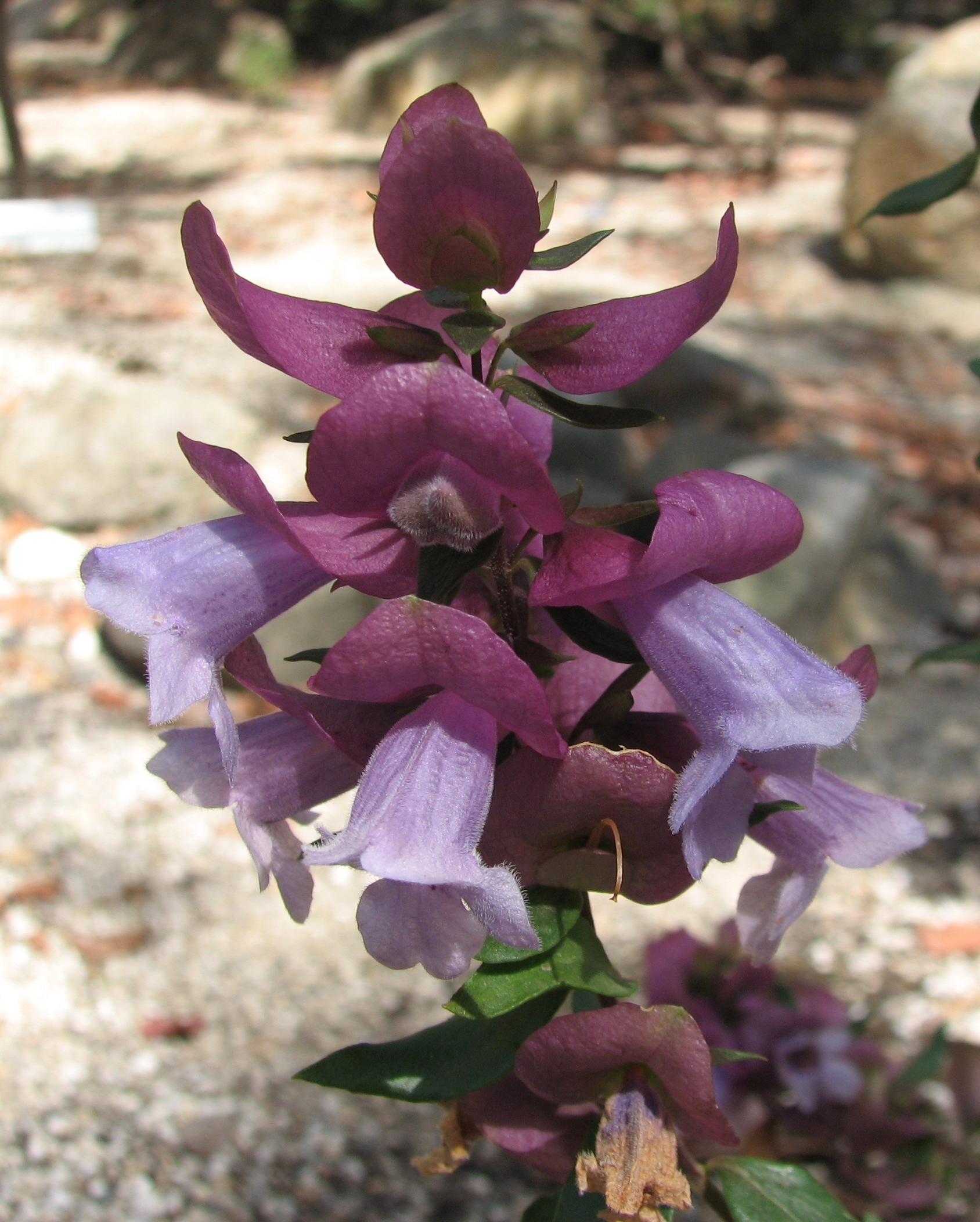
Prostanthera magnifica

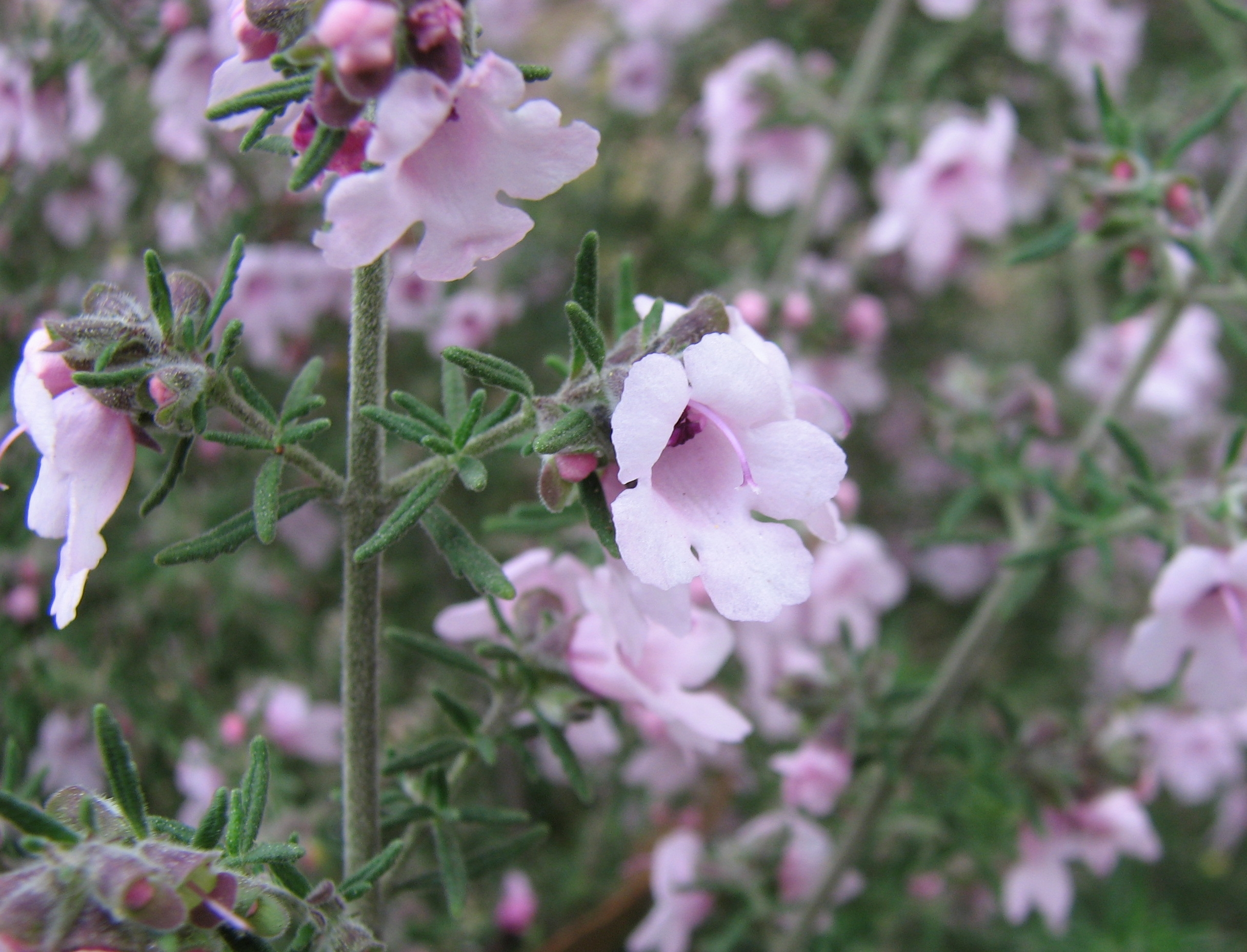
Prostanthera stenophylla

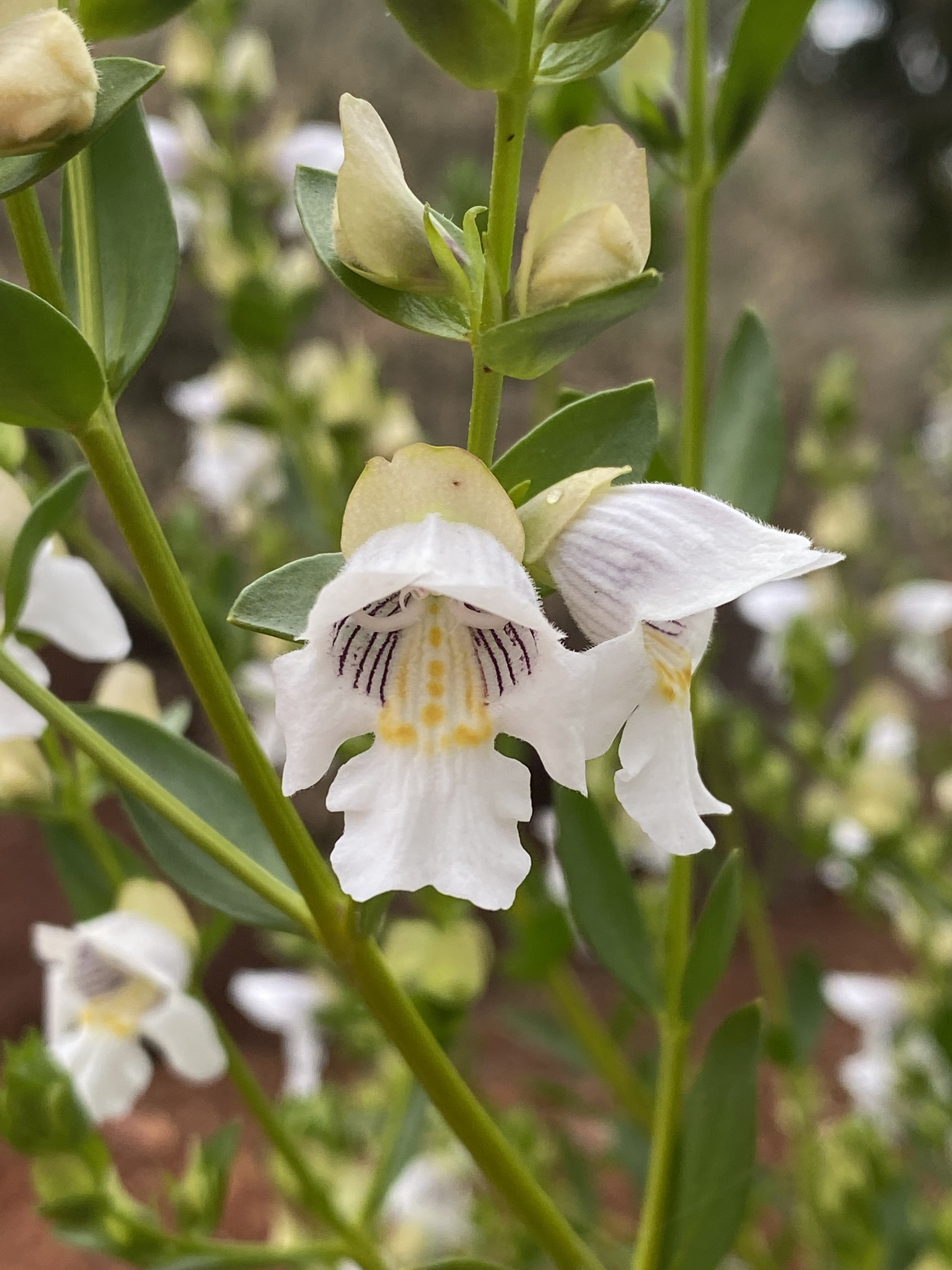
Prostanthera striatiflora

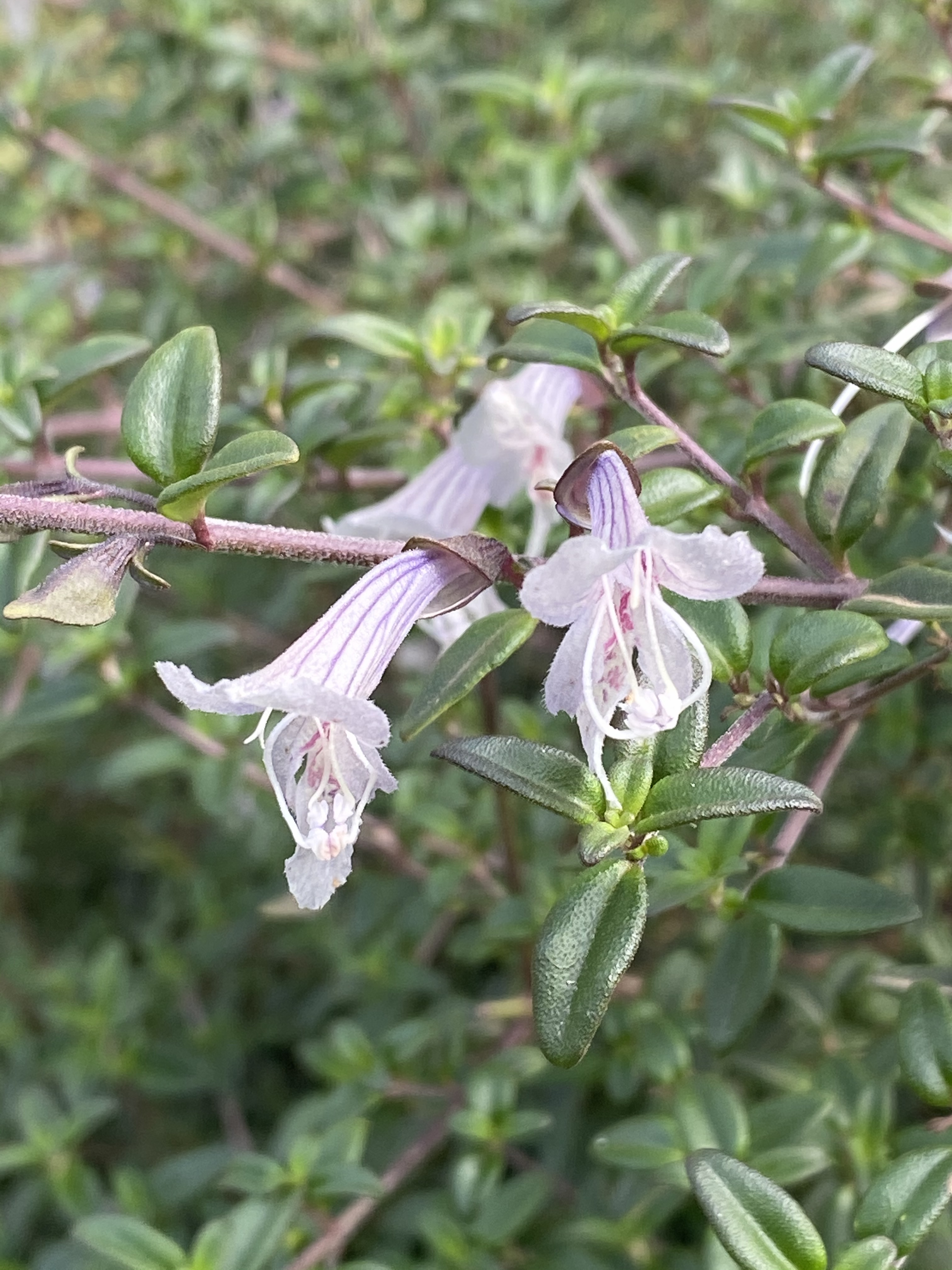
Prostanthera walteri

Prostanthera, commonly known as mintbush or mint bush, is a genus of about 100 species of flowering plants in the mint family Lamiaceae, and all are endemic to Australia. Plants are usually shrubs, rarely trees with leaves in opposite pairs. The flowers are arranged in panicles in the leaf axils or on the ends of branchlets. The sepals are joined at the base with two lobes. The petals are usually blue to purple or white, joined in a tube with two "lips", the lower lip with three lobes and the upper lip with two lobes or notched.

== Description ==
Plants in the genus Prostanthera are usually shrubs or subshrubs, rarely trees, with leaves arranged in opposite pairs. The flowers are arranged in panicles in leaf axils or on the ends of branchlets with bracts and bracteoles at the base. The sepals are joined at the base but with two lobes. The petals form a tube with two lips, the lower lip with three, usually spreading lobes and the upper lip with two lobes or a notch at the tip. The petal tube is bluish purple to white or more or less red. There are four stamens, the anthers often with a small appendage. The ovary has four lobes and the tip of the stigma has two branches.

== Taxonomy ==
The genus Prostanthera was first formally described in 1806 by Jacques Labillardière in his book Novae Hollandiae Plantarum Specimen and the first species he described was Prostanthera lasianthos. The word is derived from the Greek for an appendage. Within the flowers are small spur-like appendages on the anthers.

== Ecology ==
Prostanthera species are used as food plants by the larvae of hepialid moths of the genus Aenetus including A. eximia and A. ligniveren.

== Uses ==
Mint bushes are cultivated as ornamentals and for essential oils and spices.

== Species list ==
The following is a list of species accepted at the Australian Plant Census as at October 2025:

- Prostanthera albiflora B.J.Conn (W.A.)
- Prostanthera albohirta C.T.White (Qld.)
- Prostanthera althoferi B.J.Conn (W.A., N.T., S.A.)
  - Prostanthera althoferi B.J.Conn subsp. althoferi (W.A.)
  - Prostanthera althoferi subsp. longifolia B.J.Conn (N.T., S.A.)
- Prostanthera ammophila B.J.Conn (S.A.)
- Prostanthera arapilensis M.L.Williams, Drinnan & N.G.Walsh (Vic.)
- Prostanthera askania B.J.Conn (N.S.W.) – tranquility mint-bush
- Prostanthera aspalathoides A.Cunn. ex Benth. (S.A., N.S.W., Vic.) – scarlet mint-bush
- Prostanthera athertoniana B.J.Conn & T.C.Wilson (Qld.)
- Prostanthera baxteri A.Cunn. ex Benth. (W.A.)
- Prostanthera behriana Schltdl. (S.A.)
- Prostanthera caerulea R.Br. (N.S.W.) – lilac mint-bush
- Prostanthera calycina F.Muell. ex Benth. (S.A.) – west coast mint-bush
- Prostanthera campbellii F.Muell. (W.A.)
- Prostanthera canaliculata F.Muell. (W.A.)
- Prostanthera carrickiana B.J.Conn (W.A.) – Carrick's mintbush
- Prostanthera centralis B.J.Conn (W.A., N.T.)
- Prostanthera chlorantha (F.Muell.) F.Muell. ex Benth. (S.A.) – green mintbush
- Prostanthera cineolifera R.T.Baker & H.G.Sm. (N.S.W.) – Singleton mint bush
- Prostanthera clotteniana (F.M.Bailey.) A.R.Bean (Qld.)
- Prostanthera collina Domin (Qld.)
- Prostanthera conniana T.C.Wilson (N.S.W.)
- Prostanthera crocodyloides T.C.Wilson (N.S.W.)
- Prostanthera cruciflora J.H.Willis (N.S.W.)
- Prostanthera cryptandroides A.Cunn. ex Benth. (Qld., N.S.W.)- Wollemi mint-bush
  - Prostanthera cryptandroides A.Cunn. ex Benth. subsp. cryptandroides (N.S.W.) – Wollemi mint-bush
  - Prostanthera cryptandroides subsp. euphrasioides (Benth.) B.J.Conn (Qld., N.S.W.)
- Prostanthera cuneata Benth. (N.S.W.) – alpine mint-bush
- Prostanthera decussata F.Muell. (N.S.W., A.C.T., Vic.) – dense mintbush
- Prostanthera densa A.A.Ham. (N.S.W.) – villous mint-bush
- Prostanthera denticulata R.Br. (N.S.W., Vic.) – rough mint-bush
- Prostanthera discolor R.T.Baker (N.S.W.)
- Prostanthera eckersleyana F.Muell. (W.A.) – crinkly mint-bush
- Prostanthera elisabethae B.J.Conn & T.C.Wilson (N.S.W.)
- Prostanthera eungella B.J.Conn & K.M.Proft (Qld.)
- Prostanthera eurybioides F.Muell. (S.A.) – Monarto mint-bush
- Prostanthera ferricola B.J.Conn & K.A.Sheph. (W.A.)
- Prostanthera florifera B.J.Conn (S.A.) – Gawler Ranges mintbush
- Prostanthera galbraithiae B.J.Conn (Vic.) – Wellington mint-bush
- Prostanthera gilesii Althofer ex B.J.Conn & T.C.Wilson (N.S.W.)
- Prostanthera granitica Maiden & Betche (Qld., N.S.W.) – granite mint-bush
- Prostanthera grylloana F.Muell. (W.A.)
- Prostanthera hindii B.J.Conn (N.S.W.)
- Prostanthera hirtula F.Muell. ex Benth. (N.S.W., Vic.)
- Prostanthera howelliae Blakely (N.S.W.)
- Prostanthera incana A.Cunn. ex Benth. (N.S.W., Vic.) - velvet mint-bush
- Prostanthera incisa R.Br. (Qld., N.S.W., Vic.) – cut-leaved mint-bush
- Prostanthera incurvata B.J.Conn (W.A.)
- Prostanthera junonis B.J.Conn (N.S.W.)
- Prostanthera lanceolata Domin (N.S.W.)
- Prostanthera laricoides B.J.Conn (W.A.)
- Prostanthera lasianthos Labill. (Qld., N.S.W., A.C.T., Vic., Tas.) – Victorian Christmas bush
- Prostanthera linearis R.Br. (Qld., N.S.W.) – narrow-leaved mint-bush
- Prostanthera lithospermoides F.Muell. (Qld.)
- Prostanthera magnifica C.A.Gardner (W.A.) – magnificent mint-bush
- Prostanthera makinsonii B.J.Conn & T.C.Wilson (N.S.W.)
- Prostanthera marifolia R.Br. (N.S.W.) – Seaforth mint-bush
- Prostanthera megacalyx C.T.White & W.D.Francis (Qld.)
- Prostanthera melissifolia F.Muell. (N.S.W., Vic.) – balm mint-bush
- Prostanthera monticola B.J.Conn (N.S.W., Vic.) – monkey mint-bush, buffalo mint-bush
- Prostanthera mulliganensis B.J.Conn & T.C.Wilson (Qld.)
- Prostanthera nanophylla B.J.Conn (W.A.)
- Prostanthera nivea A.Cunn. ex Benth. (Qld., N.S.W., Vic.) – snowy mint-bush
  - Prostanthera nivea var. induta Benth. (N.S.W.)
  - Prostanthera nivea A.Cunn. ex Benth. var. nivea (N.S.W., Vic.)
- Prostanthera nudula J.M.Black ex E.L.Robertson (S.A.)
- Prostanthera oleoides T.C.Wilson & B.J.Conn (Qld.)
- Prostanthera ovalifolia R.Br. (Qld., N.S.W., Vic.) – mint bush
- Prostanthera palustris B.J.Conn (N.S.W.)
- Prostanthera parvifolia Domin (Qld.)
- Prostanthera patens B.J.Conn (W.A.)
- Prostanthera pedicellata B.J.Conn (W.A.)
- Prostanthera petraea B.J.Conn (Qld., N.S.W.)
- Prostanthera petrophila B.J.Conn (W.A.)
- Prostanthera phylicifolia F.Muell. (Qld., N.S.W., A.C.T., Vic.) – spiked mint-bush
- Prostanthera porcata B.J.Conn (N.S.W.)
- Prostanthera prostantheroides (F.Muell.) T.C.Wilson, M.J.Henwood & B.J.Conn (W.A.)
- Prostanthera prunelloides R.Br. (N.S.W.)
- Prostanthera rhombea R.Br. (N.S.W., Vic.) - sparkling mint-bush
- Prostanthera ringens Benth. (Qld., N.S.W.) – gaping mint-bush
- Prostanthera rotundifolia R.Br. (N.S.W., Vic., Tas.) – round-leaf mint-bush
- Prostanthera rugosa A.Cunn. ex Benth. (N.S.W.)
- Prostanthera saxicola R.Br. (Qld., N.S.W., Vic.)
  - Prostanthera saxicola var. bracteolata J.H.Willis (Qld., N.S.W., Vic.)
  - Prostanthera saxicola var. major Benth. (Qld., N.S.W.)
  - Prostanthera saxicola var. montana A.A.Ham. (N.S.W.)
  - Prostanthera saxicola R.Br. var. saxicola (N.S.W.)
- Prostanthera schultzii F.Muell. ex Tate (N.T.)
- Prostanthera scutata C.A.Gardner (W.A.)
- Prostanthera scutellarioides (R.Br.) Briq. (N.S.W.)
- Prostanthera sejuncta M.L.Williams, Drinnan & N.G.Walsh (N.S.W.)
- Prostanthera semiteres B.J.Conn (W.A.)
  - Prostanthera semiteres subsp. intricata B.J.Conn (W.A.)
  - Prostanthera semiteres B.J.Conn subsp. semiteres (W.A.)
- Prostanthera sericea (J.M.Black) B.J.Conn (W.A., N.T., S.A.)
- Prostanthera serpyllifolia (R.Br.) Briq. (W.A., S.A., N.S.W., Vic.) – small-leaved mint-bush
  - Prostanthera serpyllifolia subsp. microphylla (R.Br.) B.J.Conn (N.S.W., S.A., Vic., W.A.)
  - Prostanthera serpyllifolia (R.Br.) Briq. subsp. serpyllifolia (S.A., W.A.)
- Prostanthera spathulata T.C.Wilson & B.J.Conn (Qld.)
- Prostanthera spinosa F.Muell. (S.A., Vic.) – spiny mint-bush
- Prostanthera splendens B.J.Conn (W.A.)
- Prostanthera staurophylla F.Muell. (N.S.W.)
- Prostanthera stenophylla B.J.Conn (N.S.W.)
- Prostanthera striatiflora F.Muell. (W.A., N.T., S.A., N.S.W.)
- Prostanthera stricta R.T.Baker (N.S.W.) – Mount Vincent mint-bush
- Prostanthera suborbicularis C.T.White & W.D.Francis (Qld.)
- Prostanthera tallowa B.J.Conn & T.C.Wilson (N.S.W.)
- Prostanthera teretifolia Maiden & Betche (N.S.W.) – turpentine mint-bush
- Prostanthera tozerana B.J.Conn & T.C.Wilson (Qld.)
- Prostanthera tysoniana (Carrick) B.J.Conn (W.A.)
- Prostanthera verticillaris B.J.Conn (W.A.)
- Prostanthera violacea R.Br. (N.S.W.) – violet mint-bush
- Prostanthera walteri F.Muell. (N.S.W., Vic.) – blotchy mint-bush
- Prostanthera wilkieana F.Muell. (W.A., N.T., S.A.)
