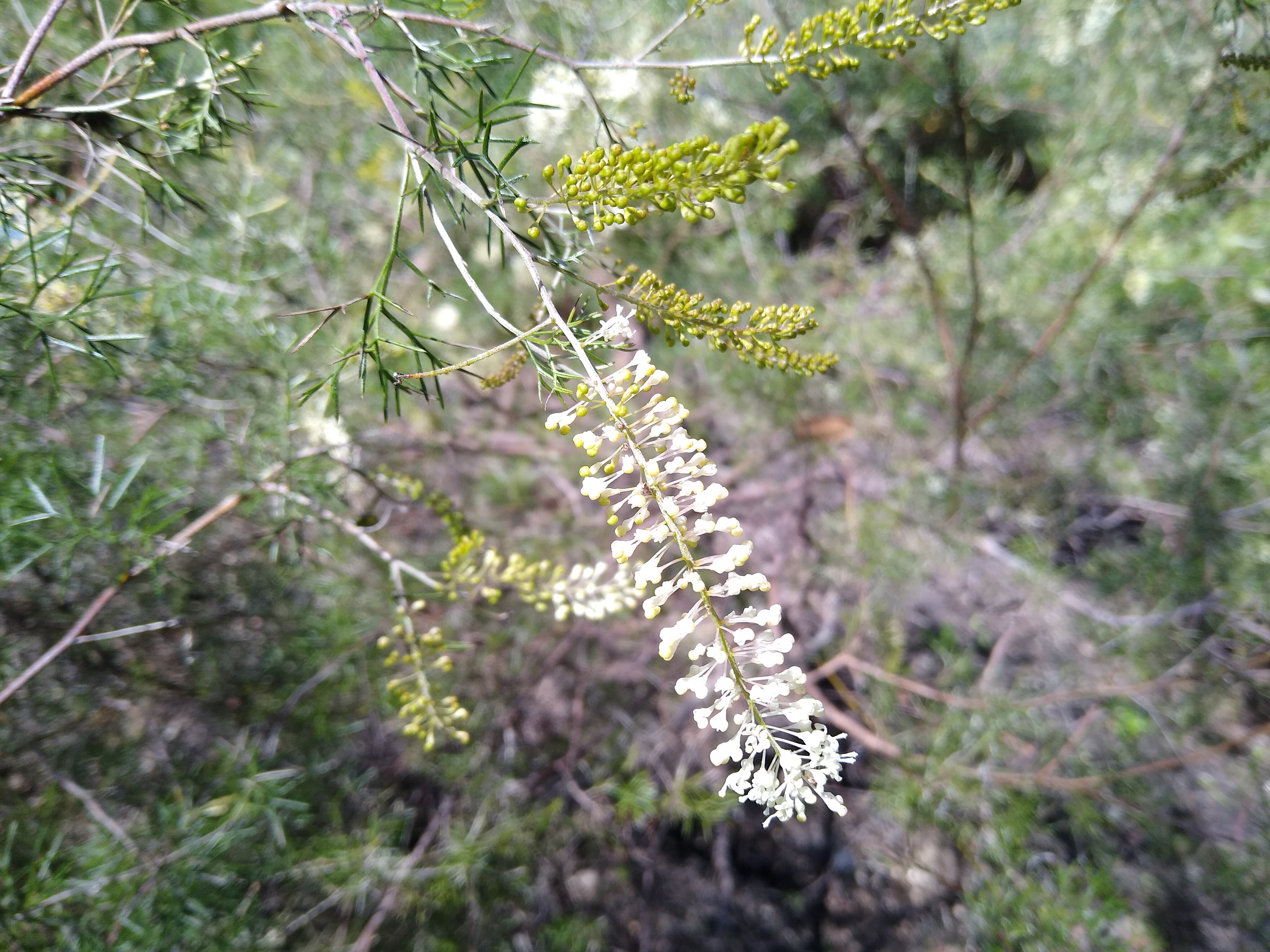
- At Illawarra Grevillea Park

Conservation status
- Priority Three — Poorly Known Taxa (DEC)

Scientific classification
- Kingdom: Plantae
- Clade: Tracheophytes
- Clade: Angiosperms
- Clade: Eudicots
- Order: Proteales
- Family: Proteaceae
- Genus: Grevillea
- Species: G. subtiliflora

Binomial name
- Grevillea subtiliflora McGill.

= Grevillea subtiliflora =

Species of shrub endemic to Western Australia

Grevillea subtiliflora is species of flowering plant in the family Proteaceae and is endemic to the southwest of Western Australia. It is an open, erect shrub with pinnatisect leaves, the end lobes linear, and clusters of white flowers that are yellowish-green in the bud stage.

== Description ==
Grevillea subtiliflora is an open, erect shrub that typically grows to a height of 1.0–2.5 m (3 ft 3 in – 8 ft 2 in) and has densely silky-hairy branchlets. Its leaves are pinnatisect, 25–45 mm (0.98–1.77 in) long with 3 to 11 lobes that are usually further divided, the end lobes linear, 5–20 mm (0.20–0.79 in) long and 0.5–1 mm (0.020–0.039 in) wide. The edges of the leaves are rolled under, enclosing the lower surface apart from the midvein. The flowers are borne in cylindrical clusters in leaf axils and at the ends of branches on a silky-hairy raceme 40–80 mm (1.6–3.1 in) long. The flowers are yellowish green in the bud stage, later white, the pistil 4–5 mm (0.16–0.20 in) long. Flowering occurs from July to October and the fruit is an oval or oblong follicle 8–10 mm (0.31–0.39 in) long.

This grevillea is sometimes confused with G. intricata that has flowers with a glabrous inner surface, and more tangled foliage.

== Taxonomy ==
Grevillea subtiliflora was first formally described in 1986 by the botanist Donald McGillivray in his book New Names in Grevillea (Proteaceae) from specimens collected by John Stanley Beard in 1973. The specific epithet (subtiliflora) means "delicately-flowered".

== Distribution and habitat ==
This grevillea grows in shrubland and is restricted to the Paynes Find area of the Avon Wheatbelt and Yalgoo bioregions of south-western Western Australia.

== Conservation status ==
This grevillea is listed as "Priority Three" by the Government of Western Australia Department of Biodiversity, Conservation and Attractions, meaning that it is poorly known and known from only a few locations but is not under imminent threat.

== See also ==
- List of Grevillea species
