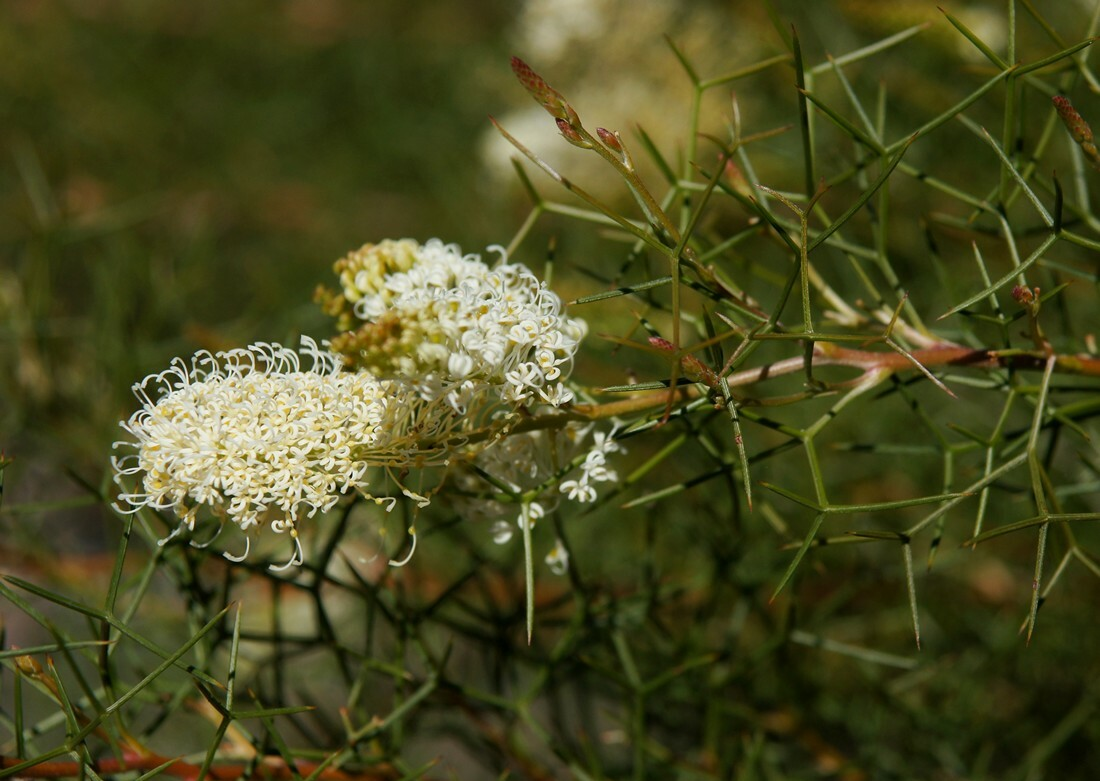

Conservation status
- Least Concern (IUCN 3.1)

- Priority Three — Poorly Known Taxa (DEC)

Scientific classification
- Kingdom: Plantae
- Clade: Embryophytes
- Clade: Tracheophytes
- Clade: Angiosperms
- Clade: Eudicots
- Order: Proteales
- Family: Proteaceae
- Genus: Grevillea
- Species: G. leucoclada

Binomial name
- Grevillea leucoclada McGill.

= Grevillea leucoclada =

Species of shrub endemic to Western Australia

Grevillea leucoclada is a species of flowering plant in the family Proteaceae and is endemic to a small area in the west of Western Australia. It is a shrub with divided leaves, the lobes further divided, the end lobes linear or tapered, and cone-shaped clusters of white to cream-coloured flowers.

== Description ==
Grevillea leptopoda is a densely-branched shrub that typically grows to a height of 0.6–3 m (2 ft 0 in – 9 ft 10 in), and has glaucous, more or less glabrous branchlets. The leaves are 60–140 mm (2.4–5.5 in) long and divided with three to seven lobes, the lobes further divided into three, the end lobes linear or tapered, 10–60 mm (0.39–2.36 in) long and 0.8–1.5 mm (0.031–0.059 in) wide. The flowers are arranged on the ends of branches and in leaf axils in sometimes branched, cone-shaped to cylindrical clusters on a rachis 40–60 mm (1.6–2.4 in) long. The flowers are white to cream-coloured, the pistil 5.5–6 mm (0.22–0.24 in) long. Flowering occurs from August to December and the fruit is an oblong follicle 8.5–13.5 mm (0.33–0.53 in) long.

This grevillea regenerates from seed and is similar to G. intricata, which does not have glaucous branchlets.

== Taxonomy ==
Grevillea leucoclada was first formally described in 1986 by Donald McGillivray in his book, New Names in Grevillea (Proteaceae) from specimens he collected with Alex George between the North West Coastal Highway and Kalbarri in 1976. The specific epithet, (leucoclada) means 'white shoot or branch', referring to the glaucous branches.

== Distribution and habitat ==
Grevillea leucoclada grows in shrubland, often in rocky places, in areas around the lower reaches of the Murchison River in the Geraldton Sandplains bioregion in the west of Western Australia.

== Conservation status ==
Grevillea leucoclada is listed as 'Priority Three' by the Government of Western Australia Department of Biodiversity, Conservation and Attractions, meaning that it is poorly known and known from only a few locations but is not under imminent threat, but as 'Least Concern' by the IUCN Red List.

== See also ==
- List of Grevillea species
