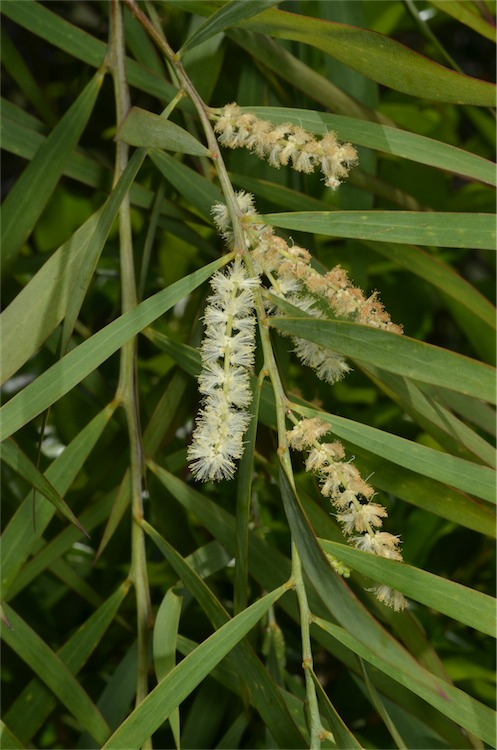

Conservation status
- Vulnerable (EPBC Act)

Scientific classification
- Kingdom: Plantae
- Clade: Tracheophytes
- Clade: Angiosperms
- Clade: Eudicots
- Clade: Rosids
- Order: Fabales
- Family: Fabaceae
- Subfamily: Caesalpinioideae
- Clade: Mimosoid clade
- Genus: Acacia
- Subgenus: Acacia subg. Juliflorae
- Species: A. courtii

Binomial name
- Acacia courtii Tindale & Hersc.
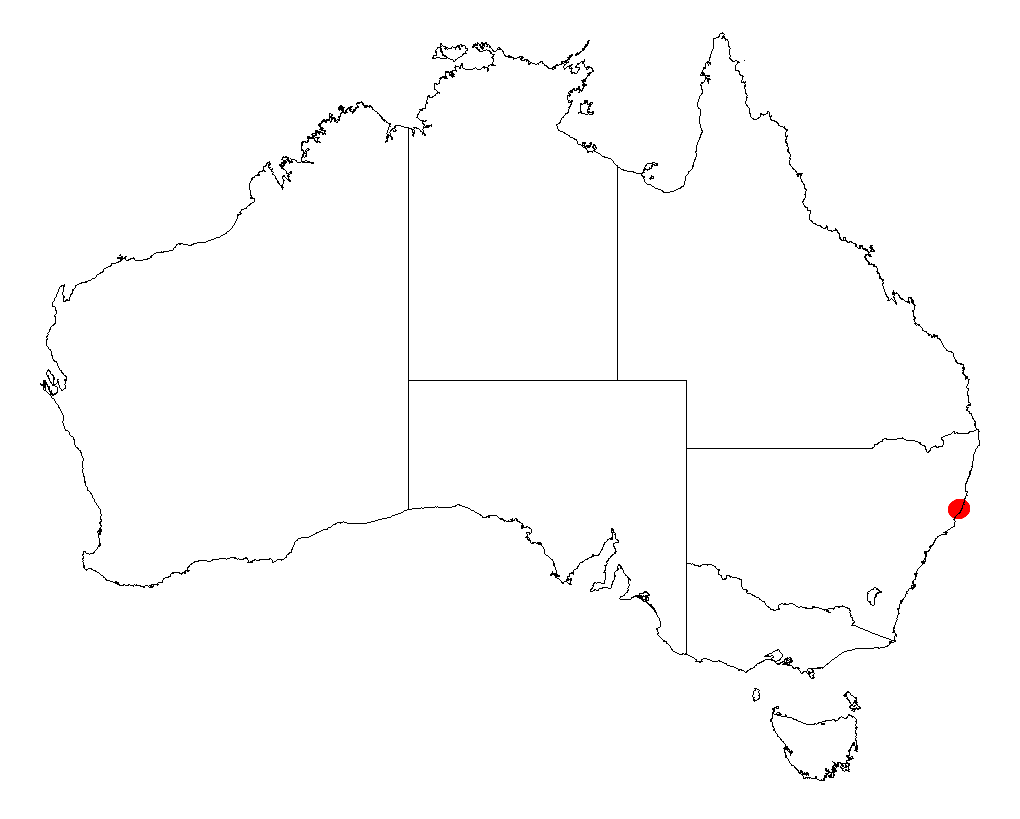
- Occurrence data from AVH

Synonyms
- Racosperma courtii (Tindale & Herscovitch) Pedley

= Acacia courtii =

Species of legume

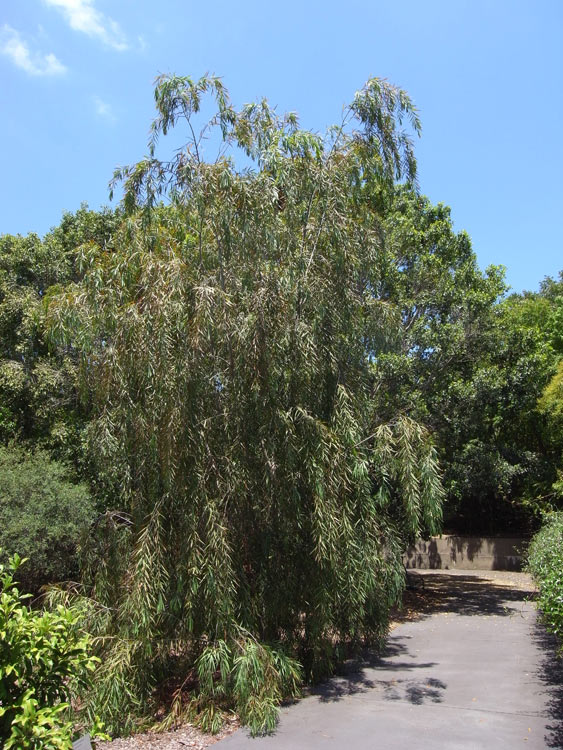
Habit in Mount Annan Botanic Gardens

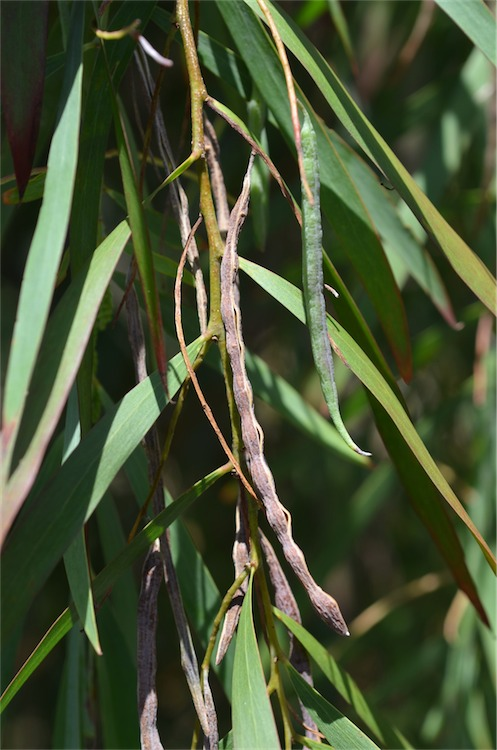
Pods

Acacia courtii, commonly known as Three Brothers wattle, Brother wattle or Northern Brother wattle, is a species of flowering plant in the family Fabaceae and is endemic to the north coast of New South Wales, Australia. It is a tall shrub or spreading tree with very narrowly elliptic phyllodes, spikes of pale yellow or cream-coloured flowers and leathery, linear pods.

== Description ==
Acacia courtii is a tall shrub or spreading, weeping tree that typically grows to a height of 7–20 m (23–66 ft) and has slender, brittle and pendulous branchlets and foliage. The bark is smooth and grey on young plants, later black and furrowed. Its phyllodes are very narrowly elliptic, usually straight, 90–180 mm (3.5–7.1 in) long and mostly 5–10 mm (0.20–0.39 in) wide, hooked and flexible, mostly glaucous with usually a single prominent vein. There are stipules less than 0.5 mm (0.020 in) long at the base of the phyllode but fall off as the phyllodes mature. The flowers are pale yellow or cream-coloured and are borne in a single or paired spikes 30–65 mm (1.2–2.6 in) long on a peduncle 3–5 mm (0.12–0.20 in) long. Flowering occurs between November and January, and the pods are linear, straight to slightly curved, 110 mm (4.3 in) long and 3–5 mm (0.12–0.20 in) wide, leathery, raised over and slightly constricted between the seeds. The seeds are shiny brown 5.5–7.8 mm (0.22–0.31 in) long with a small aril.

== Taxonomy ==
Acacia courtii was first formally described in 1990 by Mary Tindale and Josephine Clare Herscovitch in the journal Telopea on the roadside on North Brother Mountain 27 km (17 mi) west of Port Macquarie. The specific epithet (courtii) honours the botanist Arthur Bertram Court who was once the assistant director of the Australian National Botanic Gardens. It is closely related to Acacia orites.

== Distribution ==
Three Brothers wattle is endemic to a small area in the mid north coast region of New South Wales around Laurieton, Kendall and Kew where it grows on rocky hillsides among the coastal ranges in three small locations in dry forests and woodland. Six main populations are known, mostly in the Kerewong State Forest, and around North Brother Mountain and Middle Brother Mountain. It is often associated with species of Eucalyptus including; Eucalyptus acmenoides, Eucalyptus gummifera, Eucalyptus intermedia, Eucalyptus siderophloia and Eucalyptus umbra. Other species commonly found in its habitat include; Allocasuarina torulosa, Helichrysum elatum, Imperata cylindrica, Syncarpia glomulifera and Themeda australis.

== Conservation status ==
Acacia courtii is listed as "vulnerable" under the Australian Government Environment Protection and Biodiversity Conservation Act 1999 and the New South Wales Government Biodiversity Conservation Act.

== See also ==
- List of Acacia species
