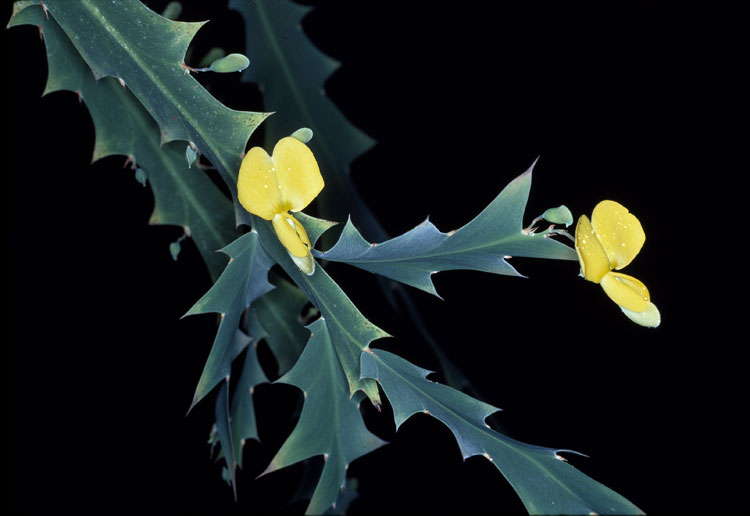
- In the Australian National Botanic Gardens

Scientific classification
- Kingdom: Plantae
- Clade: Tracheophytes
- Clade: Angiosperms
- Clade: Eudicots
- Clade: Rosids
- Order: Fabales
- Family: Fabaceae
- Subfamily: Faboideae
- Genus: Bossiaea
- Species: B. bossiaeoides

Binomial name
- Bossiaea bossiaeoides (A.Cunn. ex Benth.) Court
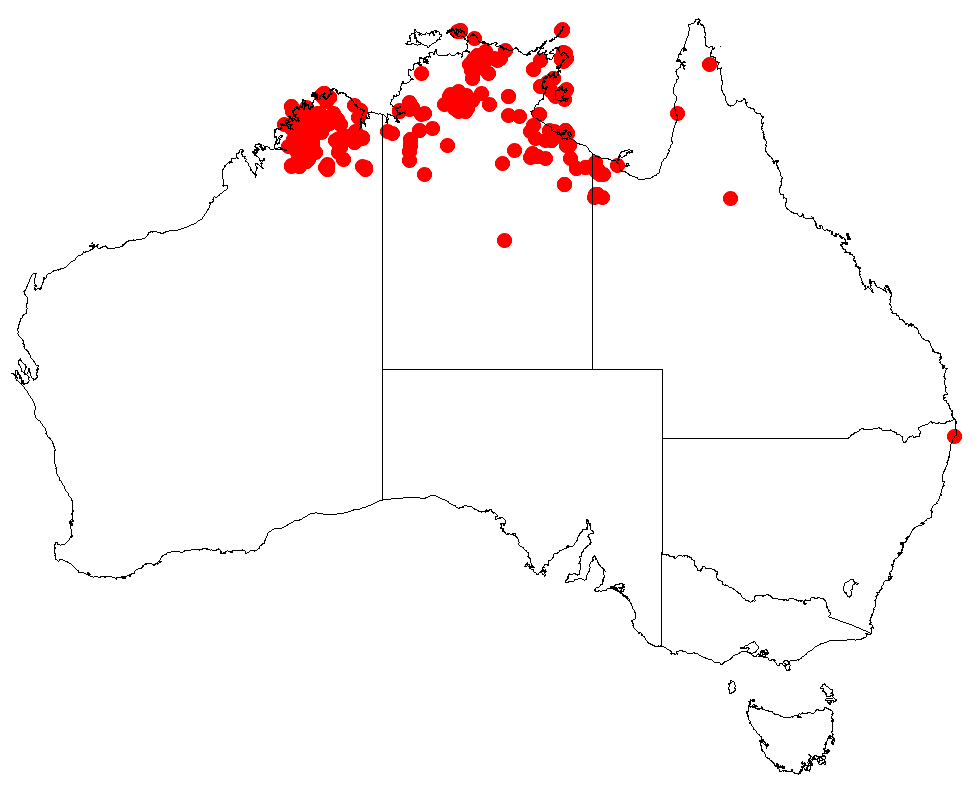
- Occurrence data from the AVH

Synonyms
- Acacia bossiaeoides A.Cunn. ex Benth.; Bossiaea phylloclada F.Muell.

= Bossiaea bossiaeoides =

Species of legume

Bossiaea bossiaeoides is a species of flowering plant in the family Fabaceae and is endemic to northern Australia. It is much-branched, glabrous shrub with broadly winged stems, winged and lobed cladodes, leaves reduced to small scales, and yellow flowers, sometimes with orange or red blotches.

== Description ==
Bossiaea bossiaeoides is a much-branched, glabrous shrub that typically grows to a height of 0.5–3 m (1 ft 8 in – 9 ft 10 in). The stems are broadly winged, with winged cladodes 10–65 mm (0.39–2.56 in) wide that have triangular, sharply-pointed lobes. The leaves are reduced to brown, egg-shaped scales, 2.5–5.0 mm (0.098–0.197 in) long. The flowers are arranged singly or in groups of up to six, each flower on a pedicel 4–10 mm (0.16–0.39 in) long with egg-shaped bracts 0.7–2.2 mm (0.028–0.087 in) long and slightly shorter bracteoles at the base. The sepals are joined at the base forming a tube 4.0–7.5 mm (0.16–0.30 in) long, the two upper lobes about 3.0–3.5 mm (0.12–0.14 in) long and the lower three lobes shorter and narrower. The standard petal is yellow, sometimes tinged with orange or red, and 15–19 mm (0.59–0.75 in) long, the wings 12–18 mm (0.47–0.71 in) long and the keel yellow or orange and 12–20 mm (0.47–0.79 in) long. Flowering occurs from April to August and the fruit is an oblong pod 35–55 mm (1.4–2.2 in) long.

== Taxonomy ==
This species was first formally described in 1842 by George Bentham from an unpublished description by Allan Cunningham who gave it the name Acacia bossiaeoides in the London Journal of Botany. Cunningham's specimens were collected near the mouth of the Liverpool River in the Northern Territory. In 1971, Arthur Bertram Court changed the name to Bossiaea bossiaeoides in the journal Muelleria. The specific epithet (bossiaeoides) means "bossiaea-like", the species having originally been placed in the genus Acacia.

== Distribution and habitat ==
Bossiaea bossiaeoides grows in open woodland or low scrub, on sand over sandstone, on dry stony hillside, often in dry stream beds or the banks of watercourses. It is widespread in tropical Australia, from islands off the coast of north-western Western Australia, through northern Western Australia and the Northern Territory to north-western Queensland.

== Conservation status ==
This bossiaea is classified as "not threatened" by the Government of Western Australia Department of Parks and Wildlife, and as "least concern" under the Northern Territory Government Territory Parks and Wildlife Conservation Act 1976 and the Queensland Government Nature Conservation Act 1992.
