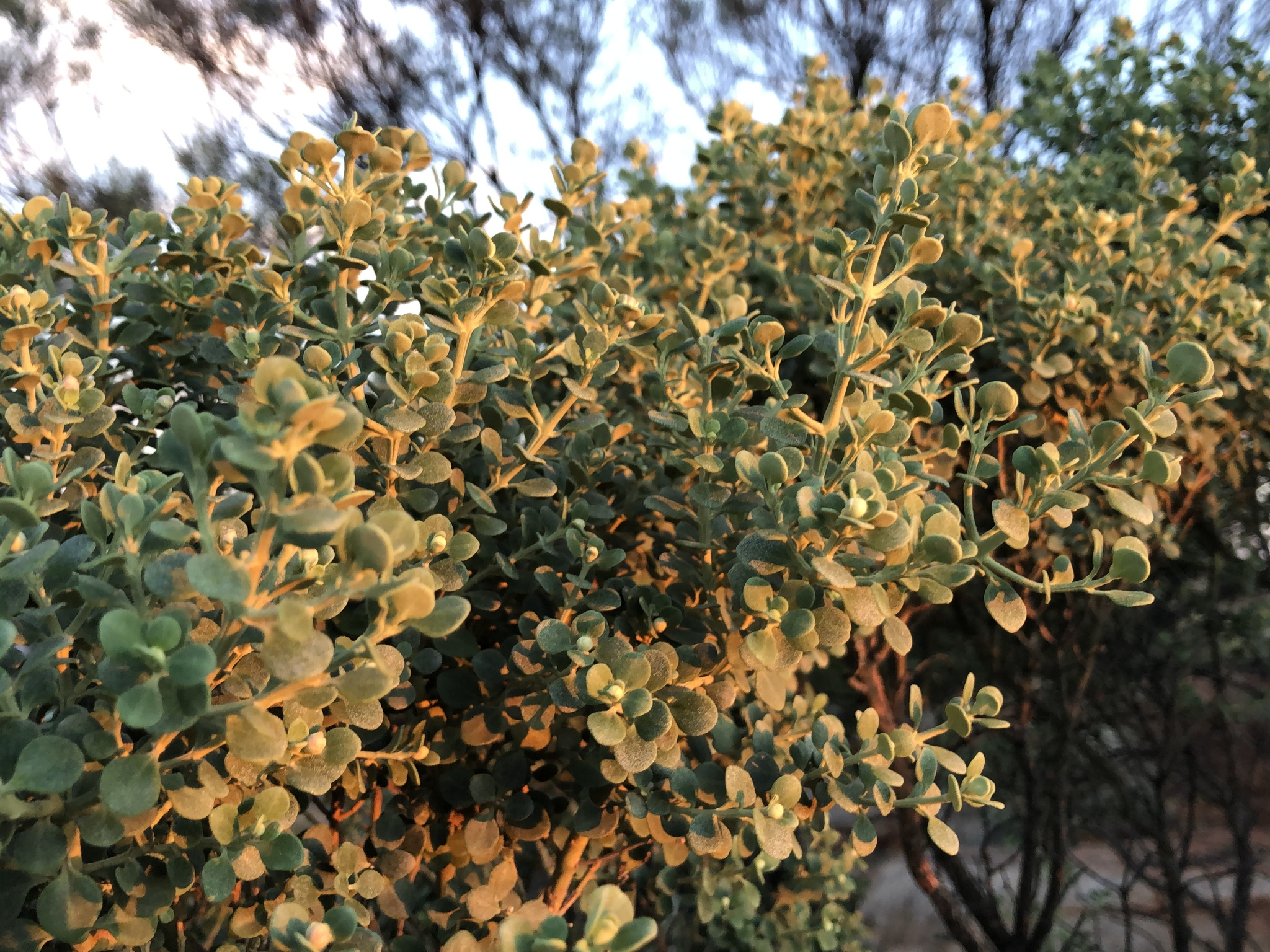

Conservation status
- Vulnerable (EPBC Act)

Scientific classification
- Kingdom: Plantae
- Clade: Tracheophytes
- Clade: Angiosperms
- Clade: Eudicots
- Clade: Asterids
- Order: Lamiales
- Family: Lamiaceae
- Genus: Prostanthera
- Species: P. schultzii

Binomial name
- Prostanthera schultzii F.Muell. ex Tate
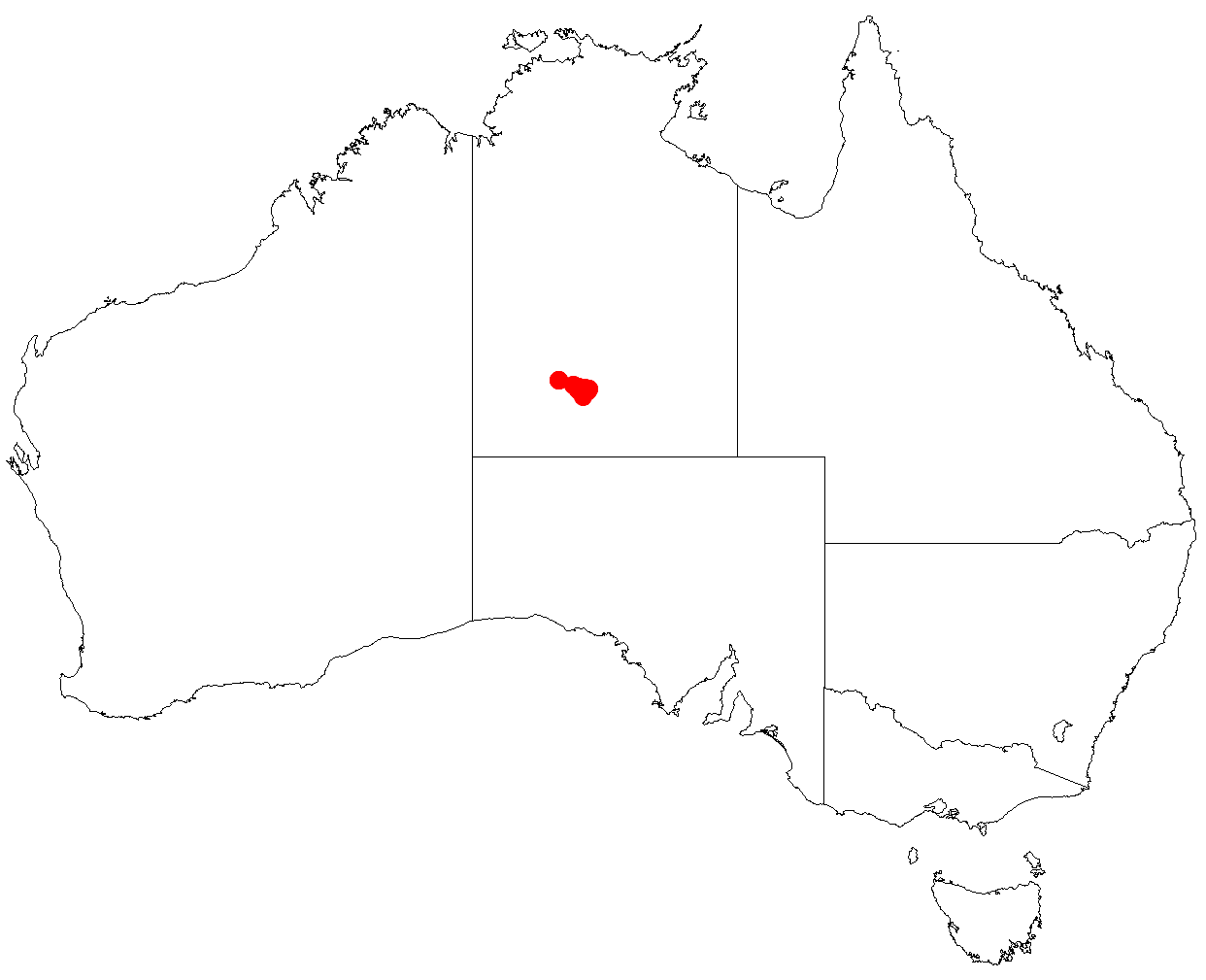
- Occurrence data from AVH

Synonyms
- Wrixonia schultzii (F.Muell. ex Tate) Carrick

= Prostanthera schultzii =

Species of flowering plant

Prostanthera schultzii is a species of flowering plant in the family Lamiaceae and is endemic to the Northern Territory. It grows as a shrub with heart-shaped to round or paddle-shaped leaves and white flowers with purple spots and yellow patches on the lower lip.

== Description ==
Prostanthera schultzii is a shrub that typically grows to a height of 0.5–1.5 m (1 ft 8 in – 4 ft 11 in) and has branches that become stiff and spine-like with age. The leaves are heart-shaped to round or paddle-shaped, 4–12 mm (0.16–0.47 in) long on a short petiole. The flowers are sessile and arranged in groups on the ends of branches with sepals forming a tube 3–3.5 mm (0.12–0.14 in) long with two lobes. The petals are white with purple spots and yellow patches on the lower lip and form a tube about 7 mm (0.28 in) long. The lower lip of the petal tube has three lobes, the centre lobe 5 mm (0.20 in) wide and the side lobes about 4 mm (0.16 in) long and 3 mm (0.12 in) wide. The upper lip has two lobes 3–3.5 mm (0.12–0.14 in) long and 2–2.5 mm (0.079–0.098 in) wide. Flowering occurs in April and July and from September to November.

== Taxonomy ==
Prostanthera schultzii was first formally described in 1896 by Ralph Tate from an unpublished description by Ferdinand von Mueller and the description was published in Report on the work of the Horn Scientific Expedition to Central Australia. The type specimens were collected on the "higher slopes of Mount Sonder". In 1976, John Carrick changed the name to Wrixonia schultzii but in 2012 Trevor Wilson, Murray Henwood and Barry Conn changed the name back to P. schultzii.

== Distribution and habitat ==
This mintbush grows in sheltered upper slopes of the Chewings Range in the West MacDonnell National Park of the Northern Territory.

== Conservation status ==
Prostanthera schultzii is classified as "vulnerable" under the Australian Government Environment Protection and Biodiversity Conservation Act 1999 and the Northern Territory Government Territory Parks and Wildlife Conservation Act 1976.
