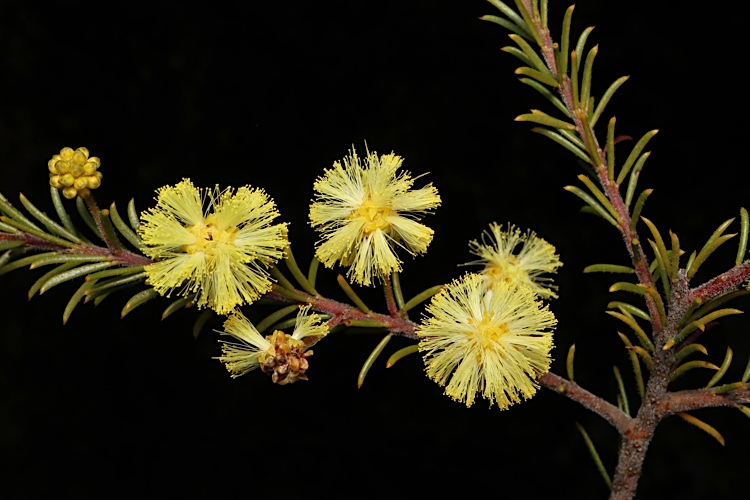
- In the Australian National Botanic Gardens

Conservation status
- Endangered (EPBC Act)

Scientific classification
- Kingdom: Plantae
- Clade: Tracheophytes
- Clade: Angiosperms
- Clade: Eudicots
- Clade: Rosids
- Order: Fabales
- Family: Fabaceae
- Subfamily: Caesalpinioideae
- Clade: Mimosoid clade
- Genus: Acacia
- Species: A. gordonii

Binomial name
- Acacia gordonii (Tindale) Pedley
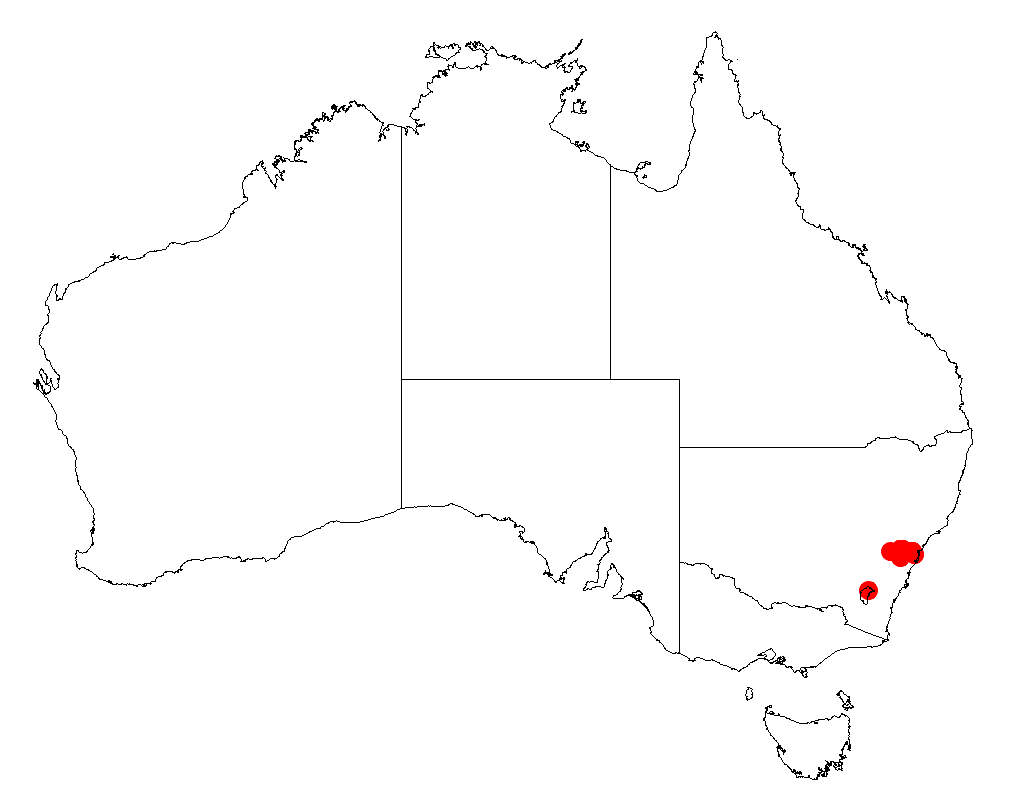
- Occurrence data from AVH

Synonyms
- Acacia brunioides subsp. gordonii Tindale; Racosperma gordonii (Tindale) Pedley

= Acacia gordonii =

Gordon's wattle

Species of legume

Acacia gordonii commonly known as Gordon's wattle, is a species of flowering plant in the family Fabaceae and is endemic to a small area of New South Wales, Australia. It is an erect or spreading shrub with smooth bark, straight or slightly curved, more or less spirally arranged phyllodes, spherical heads of bright, deep golden yellow flowers, and oblong to narrowly oblong, glabrous, thinly leathery pods.

== Description ==
Acacia gordonii is an erect or spreading shrub that typically grows to a height of 0.5–1.5 m (1 ft 8 in – 4 ft 11 in), and has smooth grey bark and more or less terete, densely hairy branchlets. The phyllodes are more or less spirally arranged on prominent stem-projections, crowded, ascending to erect, straight to slightly curved, 8–15 mm (0.31–0.59 in) long and 0.7–1.0 mm (0.028–0.039 in) wide, covered with soft hairs and lacking obvious veins. The flowers are borne in a spherical head in axils on a peduncle 8–15 mm (0.31–0.59 in) long, each head with usually 20 to 25 bright, deep golden yellow flowers. Flowering occurs in August and September, and the pods are oblong to narrowly oblong, up to 55 mm (2.2 in) long and 9–15 mm (0.35–0.59 in) wide, firmly papery to thinly leathery, blackish and glabrous. The seeds are elliptic, 3–4 mm (0.12–0.16 in) long with an aril.

== Taxonomy ==
This species was first formally described in 1968 by Mary Tindale in Contributions from the New South Wales National Herbarium from specimens collected 18 mi (29 km) north-north-west of Windsor, "localised to a small area on top or monolithic-type rocks in dry sclerophylls forest" by Ernest Francis Constable. In 1980, Leslie Pedley raised the subspecies to species status as Acacia gordonii in the journal Austrobaileya. The specific epithet (gordonii) honours Mr. Eric Gordon, who drew the attention of the author, Mary Tindale, and provided her with material with flowers and mature legumes.

== Distribution and habitat ==
Gordon's wattle grows in forest and heath near sandstone outcrops north-west of Sydney in two locations in the lower Blue Mountains and in the Maroota-Glenorie area.

== Ecology ==
This species resprouts and germinates prolifically after high-intensity fire.

== Conservation status ==
Acacia gordonii is listed as "endangered" under the Australian Government Environment Protection and Biodiversity Conservation Act 1999 and the New South Wales Government Biodiversity Conservation Act 2016.

== See also ==
- List of Acacia' species
