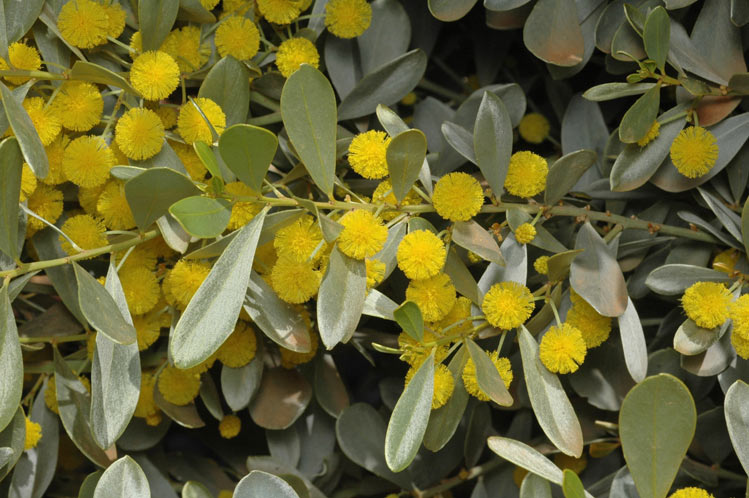

Scientific classification
- Kingdom: Plantae
- Clade: Tracheophytes
- Clade: Angiosperms
- Clade: Eudicots
- Clade: Rosids
- Order: Fabales
- Family: Fabaceae
- Subfamily: Caesalpinioideae
- Clade: Mimosoid clade
- Genus: Acacia
- Species: A. argyraea

Binomial name
- Acacia argyraea Tindale
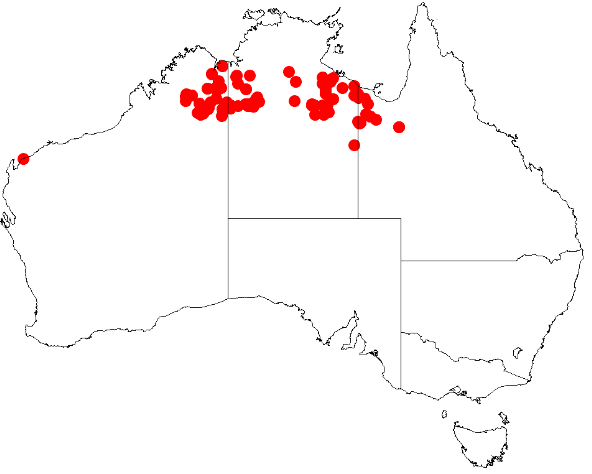
- Occurrence data from AVH

Synonyms
- Racosperma argyraeum (Tindale) Pedley

= Acacia argyraea =

Species of legume

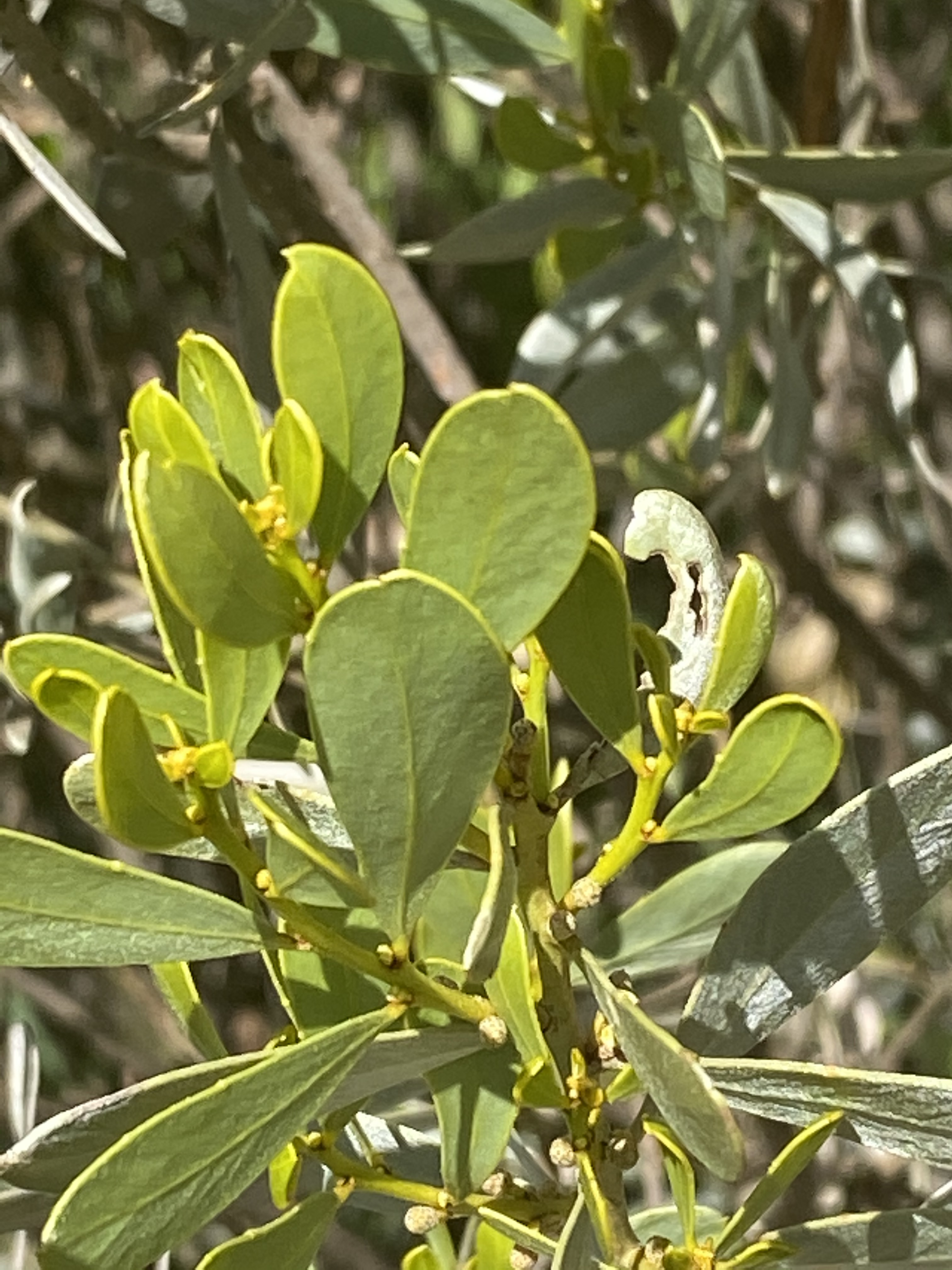
Foliage

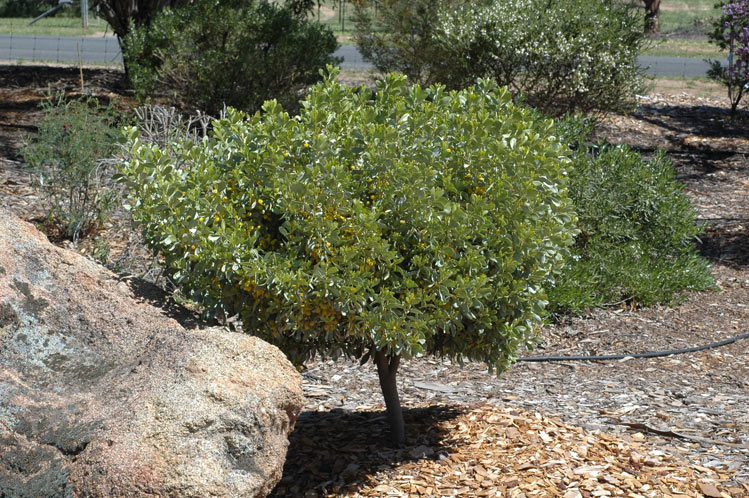
Habit

Acacia argyraea is a species of flowering plant in the family Fabaceae and is endemic to tropical parts of northern Australia. It is a shrub or tree with smooth bark, narrowly elliptic to elliptic phyllodes, spikes of pale yellow flowers in axils, and linear to lance-shaped pods up to 85 cm (33 in) long.

== Description ==
Acacia argyraea is a shrub or tree with smooth grey to brown bark, that typically grows to a height of up to 3 m (9.8 ft) and is covered with silvery, silky hairs. Its branchlets are two- or three-angled, especially near their ends. The phyllodes are narrowly elliptical to elliptical, 40–80 mm (1.6–3.1 in) long, 15–35 mm (0.59–1.38 in) wide and leathery with three to six prominent veins. The flowers are pale yellow, and borne in single spikes in axils 10–25 mm (0.39–0.98 in) long. Flowering occurs in July and August, and the fruit is a flat, linear to lance-shaped pod 60–85 mm (2.4–3.3 in) long, and contains brown, oblong to elliptic seeds 4–6.5 mm (0.16–0.26 in) long.

== Taxonomy ==
Acacia argyraea was first formally described in 1970 by Mary Tindale in Contributions from the New South Wales National Herbarium from specimens collected from Nicholson station, in Western Australia in 1967. The specific epithet (argyraea) means 'silvery in colour'.

== Distribution ==
This species of wattle is native to an area of the Kimberley region of Western Australia, to the Northern Territory and north western Queensland north of around 20° in latitude, but is considered to be quite rare in Queensland. It is often in found around areas of shale, but also will grow in lateritic and sandy soils.

== See also ==
- List of Acacia species
