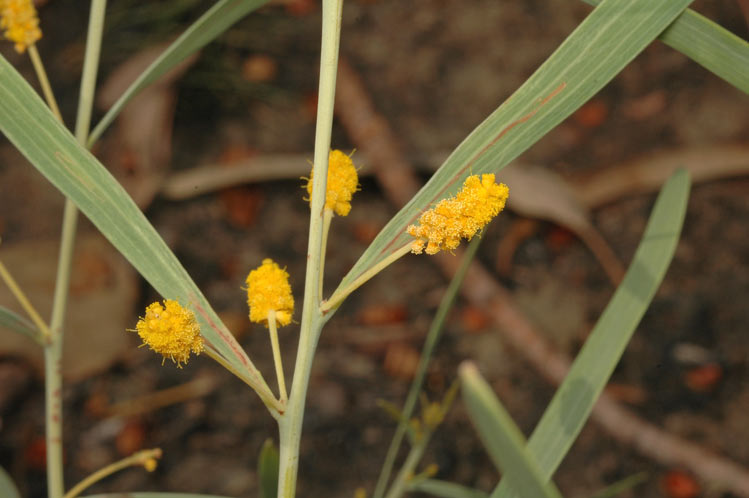

Conservation status
- Vulnerable (EPBC Act)

Scientific classification
- Kingdom: Plantae
- Clade: Embryophytes
- Clade: Tracheophytes
- Clade: Spermatophytes
- Clade: Angiosperms
- Clade: Eudicots
- Clade: Rosids
- Order: Fabales
- Family: Fabaceae
- Subfamily: Caesalpinioideae
- Clade: Mimosoid clade
- Genus: Acacia
- Species: A. praetermissa

Binomial name
- Acacia praetermissa Tindale
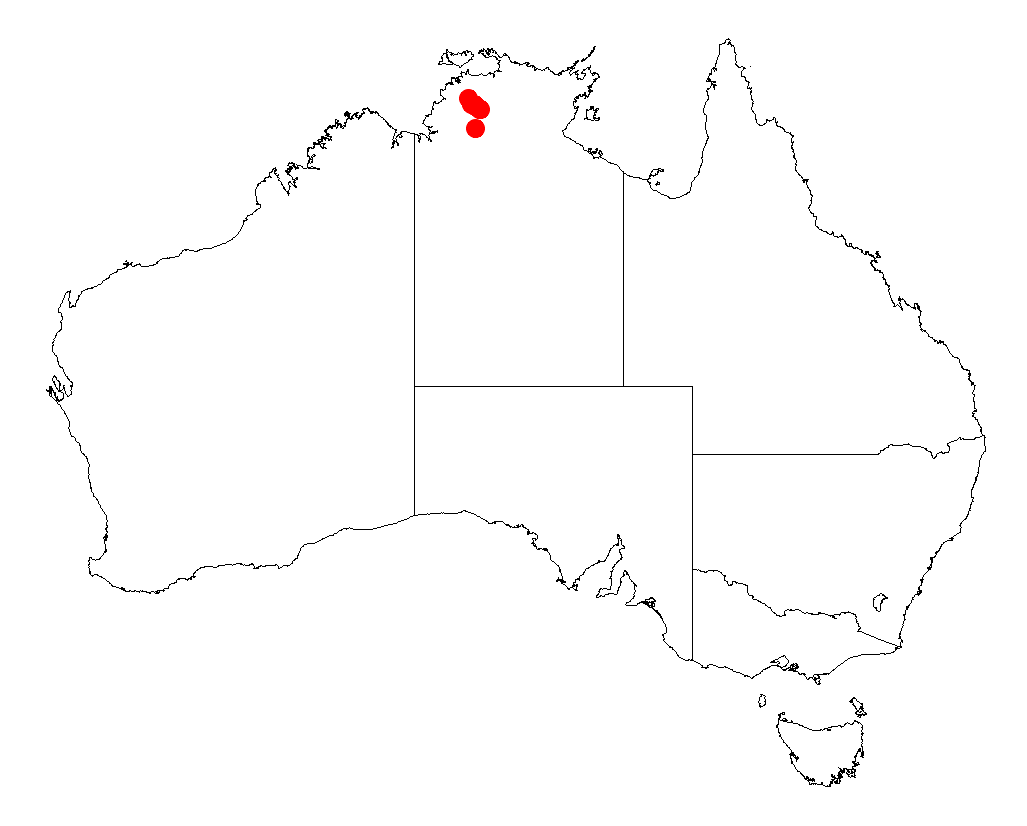
- Occurrence data from AVH

= Acacia praetermissa =

Species of legume

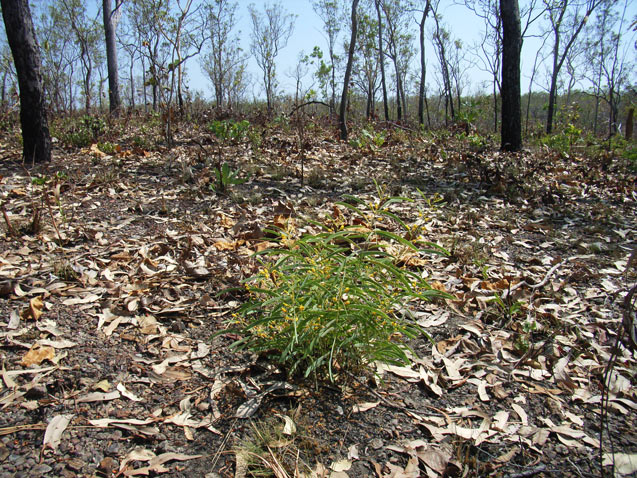
Habit near Emerald Springs, south of Darwin

Acacia praetermissa is a species of wattle native to a small area in the Northern Territory of Australia. It was listed as vulnerable in 2006 according to the Environment Protection and Biodiversity Conservation Act 1999.

== Description ==
The shrub to typically grows to a height of 1.8 m (5 ft 11 in) and has multiple stems and can resprout from perennial rootstock after a bushfire. It has blotchy blue-grey coloured bark with a smooth texture and purple-brown terete branchlets that are often covered in a fine white powdery coating. Like most species of Acacia it has phyllodes rather than true leaves. The spreading phyllodes have a narrowly oblanceolate to elliptic shape and are slightly sickle shaped. They have a length of 9 to 18 cm (3.5 to 7.1 in) and a width of 3 to 18 mm (0.12 to 0.71 in) and have a prominent mid-nerve and two to four less prominent nerves. It blooms between February and August producing cylindrical flower-spikes that are 1 to 2.7 cm (0.39 to 1.06 in) in length and packed with golden coloured flowers. Following flowering it produces glabrous woody seed pods that have a more or less linear to narrowly oblanceolate shape. The flat pods have straight sides or a little constricted between each of the seeds and have a length of 4.5 to 10.5 cm (1.8 to 4.1 in) and have oblique to longitudinal nerves. The brown seeds inside have an oblong elliptic to orbicular shape with a length of 5 to 7 mm (0.20 to 0.28 in) and a conical aril.

== Distribution ==
The shrub has a limited distribution in the Pine Creek to Emerald Springs are in the top end of the Northern Territory where it is often situated on hillsides in lateritic or sandy silt soils as a part of Eucalyptus woodland communities. The known populations are found along part of the Stuart Highway over a length of around 52 km (32 mi) but with a width of less than 1 km (0.62 mi) with an estimated total population of less than 300 plants.

== See also ==
- List of Acacia species
