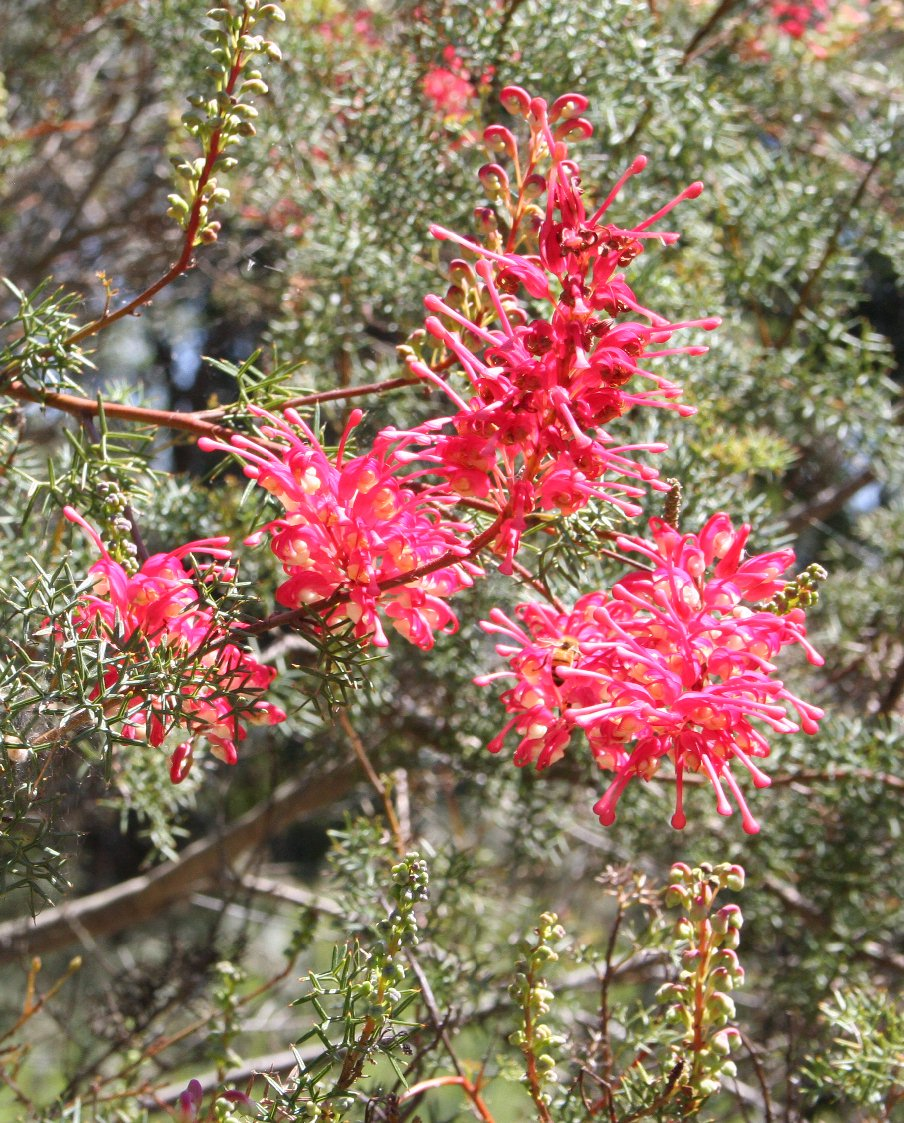
- In the Hunter Region Botanic Gardens

Conservation status
- Least Concern (IUCN 3.1)

- Priority Three — Poorly Known Taxa (DEC)

Scientific classification
- Kingdom: Plantae
- Clade: Embryophytes
- Clade: Tracheophytes
- Clade: Angiosperms
- Clade: Eudicots
- Order: Proteales
- Family: Proteaceae
- Genus: Grevillea
- Species: G. georgeana

Binomial name
- Grevillea georgeana McGill.

= Grevillea georgeana =

Species of shrub endemic to Western Australia

Grevillea georgeana is a species of flowering plant in the family Proteaceae and is endemic to inland areas of south-western Western Australia. It is an erect to widely spreading shrub with deeply divided leaves, the end lobes linear and sharply pointed, and scarlet to bright reddish-pink and cream-coloured flowers.

== Description ==
Grevillea georgeana is an erect to widely spreading shrub that typically grows to 1–3 m (3 ft 3 in – 9 ft 10 in) high and up to 4 m (13 ft) wide. Its leaves are deeply divided, 30–70 mm (1.2–2.8 in) long with six to thirteen lobes, sometimes further divided, the end lobes linear, 4–19 mm (0.16–0.75 in) long, 1.0–1.5 mm (0.039–0.059 in) wide and sharply pointed. The edges of the leaflets are rolled under, enclosing most of the lower surface. The flowers are arranged in clusters along a rachis 15–70 mm (0.59–2.76 in) long and are bright reddish-pink and cream-coloured, the pistil mostly 25–27 mm (0.98–1.06 in) long and the style red. Flowering mainly occurs from July to October and the fruit is a more or less spherical follicle 7–10 mm (0.28–0.39 in) long with a few shaggy hairs.

== Taxonomy ==
Grevillea georgeana was first formally described in 1986 by Donald McGillivray in his book New Names in Grevillea (Proteaceae), based on specimens collected on the Die Hardy Range north of Southern Cross in 1976. The specific epithet (georgeana) honours Alex George, who, with McGillivray, collected the type specimens.

== Distribution and habitat ==
This grevillea grows in open shrubland in shallow, stony soils in the ranges north of Southern Cross between Koolyanobbing and Diemals.

== Conservation status ==
Grevillea georgeana has been listed as least concern on the IUCN Red List of Threatened Species. Although it occurs within a relatively restricted distribution and its population is in decline, its current threats are not considered major and its population is not declining rapidly enough to warrant a threatened or near-threatened category.

It is also classified as priority three by the Government of Western Australia Department of Biodiversity, Conservation and Attractions, meaning that it is poorly known and known from only a few locations but is not under imminent threat.
