= Prostanthera tysoniana =

Conservation status
- Priority Three — Poorly Known Taxa (DEC)

Scientific classification
- Kingdom: Plantae
- Clade: Tracheophytes
- Clade: Angiosperms
- Clade: Eudicots
- Clade: Asterids
- Order: Lamiales
- Family: Lamiaceae
- Genus: Prostanthera
- Species: P. tysoniana

Binomial name
- Prostanthera tysoniana (Carrick) B.J.Conn
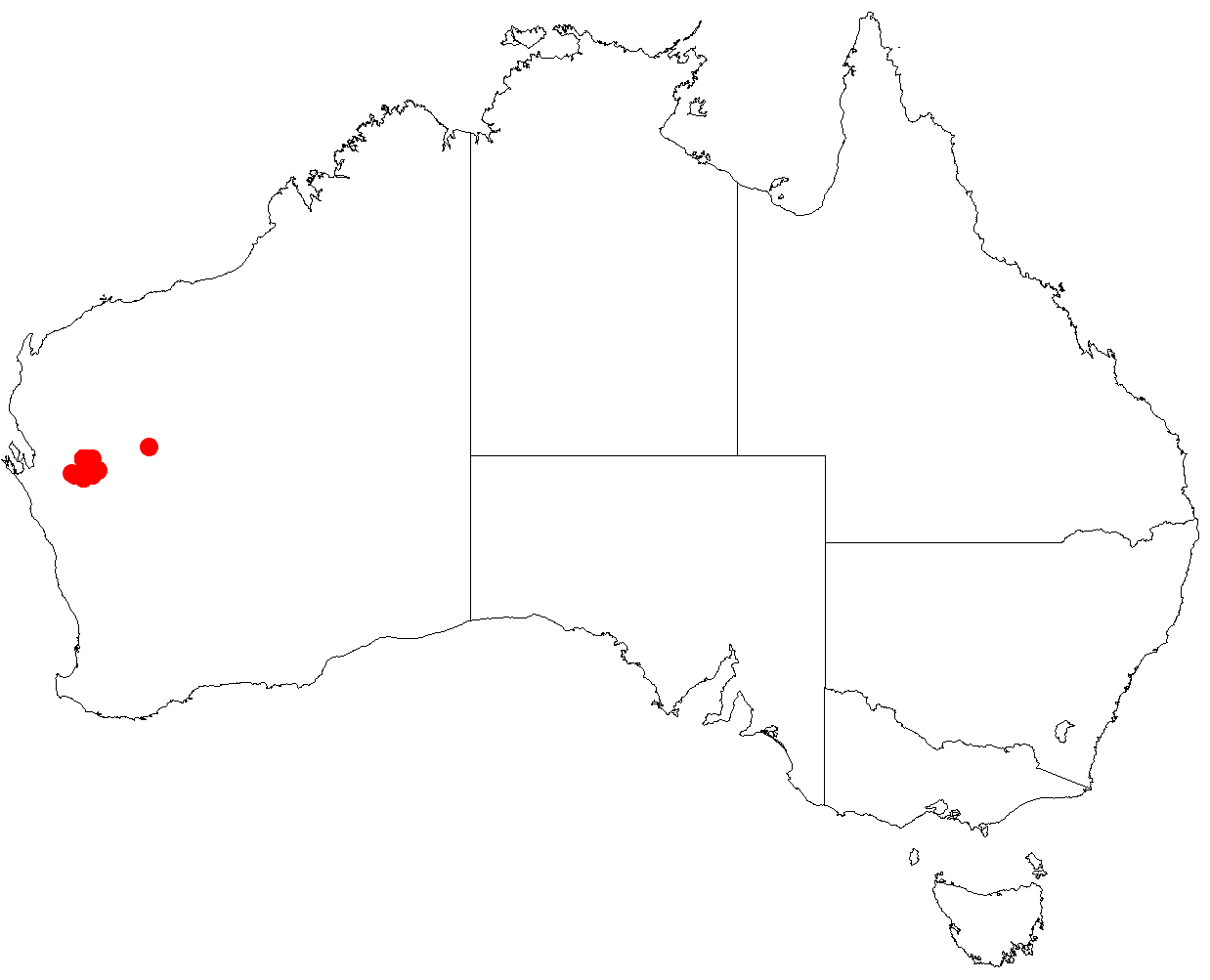
- Occurrence data from AVH

Synonyms
- Eichlerago tysoni Althofer orth. var.; Eichlerago tysoniana Carrick; Prostanthera sp.; Prostanthera tysoni C.A.Gardner nom. inval., nom. nud.; Prostanthera tysonii Beard nom. inval., nom. nud.; Prostanthera tysonii Althofer

Species of flowering plant

Prostanthera tysoniana is a species of flowering plant in the family Lamiaceae and is endemic to Western Australia. It is a small, intricately branched shrub with broadly elliptic leaves arranged in opposite pairs and white or cream-coloured flowers with purple streaks.

== Description ==
Prostanthera tysoniana is a shrub that typically grows to a height of 0.2–0.5 m (7.9 in – 1 ft 7.7 in) and has intricately branched stems that are square in cross-section. The leaves are arranged in opposite pairs, broadly elliptic to more or less round, 2–4 mm (0.079–0.157 in) long and wide. The flowers are borne singly in leaf axils on a woolly pedicel 1–3 mm (0.039–0.118 in) long with bracteoles about 1 mm (0.039 in) long at the base of the sepals. The sepals are about 3 mm (0.12 in) long with two lobes, about 2–4.5 mm (0.079–0.177 in) long and 5 mm (0.20 in) wide. The petals are white or cream-colured with purple streaks, 9–12 mm (0.35–0.47 in) long forming a tube about 5 mm (0.20 in) long with two lips, the lower with three lobes about 5 mm (0.20 in) long and 3 mm (0.12 in) wide, the upper about 6 mm (0.24 in) long and wide with two lobes. Flowering occurs in September.

== Taxonomy ==
This mintbush was first formally described in 1997 by John Carrick who gave it the name Eichlerago tysoniana in the Journal of the Adelaide Botanic Gardens, from specimens collected by Isaac Tyson near the Murchison River in 1898. In 1992, Barry Conn changed the name to Prostanthera tysoniana in the journal Telopea.

== Distribution and habitat ==
Prostanthera tysoniana is a rare species, only known from the Byro-Mount Narryer area in the Murchison biogeographic region.

== Conservation status ==
Prostanthera tysoniana is classified as "Priority Three" by the Government of Western Australia Department of Parks and Wildlife meaning that it is poorly known and known from only a few locations but is not under imminent threat.
