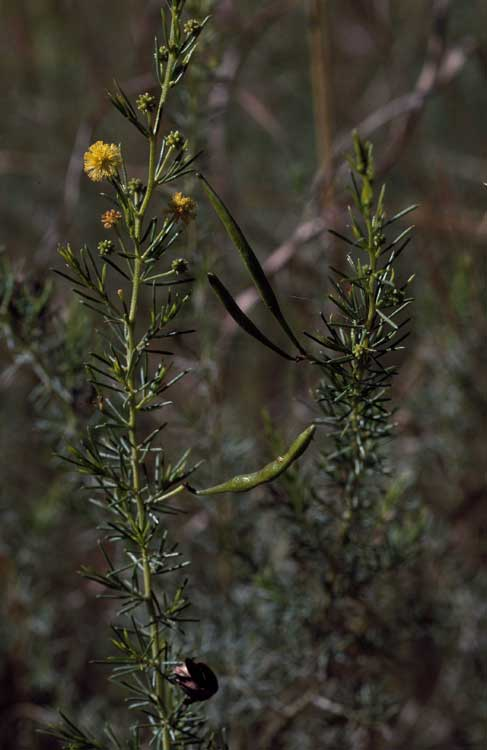
- Near the Gibb River Road

Scientific classification
- Kingdom: Plantae
- Clade: Tracheophytes
- Clade: Angiosperms
- Clade: Eudicots
- Clade: Rosids
- Order: Fabales
- Family: Fabaceae
- Subfamily: Caesalpinioideae
- Clade: Mimosoid clade
- Genus: Acacia
- Species: A. delicatula

Binomial name
- Acacia delicatula Tindale & P.G.Kodela
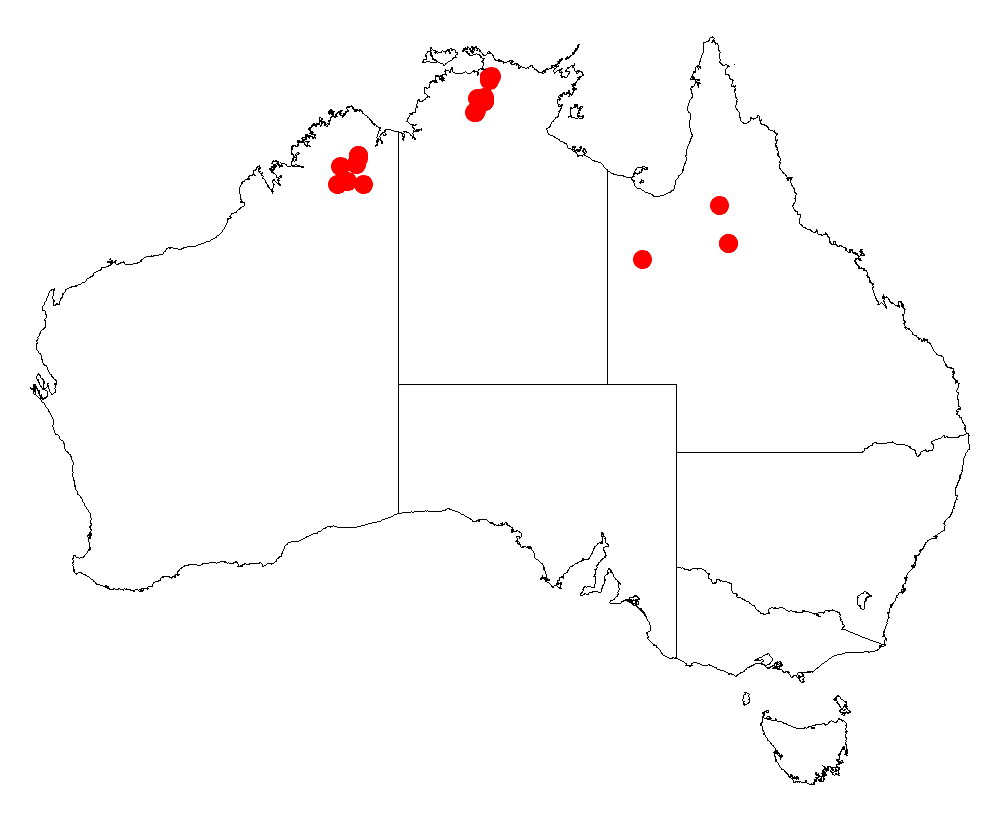
- Occurrence data from AVH

Synonyms
- Acacia sp. C Kimberley Flora; Racosperma delicatulum (Tindale & Kodela) Pedley

= Acacia delicatula =

Species of legume

Acacia delicatula is a species of flowering plant in the family Fabaceae and is endemic to northern Australia. It is an erect to ascending shrub with clusters of linear to thread-like phyllodes, spherical heads of yellow flowers and very narrowly lance-shaped, woody pods.

== Description ==
Acacia delicatula is an erect to ascending, often spreading shrub that typically grows to a height of up to 1.5 m (4 ft 11 in) and has finely fissured bark and terete, more or less terete branchlets. The phyllodes are arranged in clusters of up to six, linear to thread-like, straight or slightly curved, 7–13 mm (0.28–0.51 in) long and 0.2–0.5 mm (0.0079–0.0197 in) wide. The flowers are borne in one or two spherical heads in axils on a peduncle 10–15 mm (0.39–0.59 in) long, each head 4–6.5 mm (0.16–0.26 in) in diameter with 34 to 38 yellow flowers. Flowering has been recorded in January, March to May and July to August, and the pods are mostly very narrowly lance-shaped, straight sided, flat, 20–44 mm (0.79–1.73 in) long, 3–4 mm (0.12–0.16 in) wide, woody and glabrous.

== Taxonomy ==
Acacia delicatula was first formally described in 1992 by Mary Tindale and Phillip Gerhard Kodela in the journal Telopea from specimens collected in the Northern Territory in 1980. The specific epithet (delicatula) means 'small and delicate', referring to the phyllodes.

== Distribution and habitat ==
This species of wattle is usually grows in shrubland or open savanna on rocky or stony plateaus and hilltops in the north-west of Western Australia and the northern part of the Northern Territory.

== Conservation status ==
Acacia delicatula is listed as "not threatened" by the Government of Western Australia Department of Biodiversity, Conservation and Attractions, and as of "least concern" under the Northern Terriitory Territory Parks and Wildlife Conservation Act.

== See also ==
- List of Acacia species
