= Australian Botanical Liaison Officer =

Secondment position at the Royal Botanic Gardens, UK

Australian Botanical Liaison Officer was a secondment position, held for up to twelve months by an Australian botanist (or expert in Australian botany) at the Royal Botanic Gardens in Kew, London, England in the United Kingdom. The position was created in 1937, and the first ABLO was Charles Gardner. Travel and living costs for the position were funded by the Australian government, with the appointee's salary continuing to be paid by their current employing institution.

The position was advertised by the Australian Biological Resources Study (ABRS), part of the Australian government's Department of the Environment and Heritage. Assessment and selection of candidates is undertaken by the Council of Heads of Australian Herbaria (CHAH), who advised the Australian Biological Resources Study Advisory Committee (ABRSAC) to recommend the Minister approve the appointment.

In 2009, a review was conducted by ABRS, CHAH and the Advisory Committee which determined that there was no strong need for the ABLO position due to advances in digital technology which gave detailed access to herbarium specimen data over the internet, and the position was discontinued. A research grants system replaced the program, which aimed to fund overseas placements at botanical institutions other than Kew Gardens.

== List of Australian Botanical Liaison Officers ==
(List sourced from Department of Climate Change, Energy, the Environment and Water)

- Charles Gardner (1937–1939)
- Cyril Tenison White (1939)
- Mary Tindale (1949–1951)
- Nancy Burbidge (1952–1954)
- Patrick Morris (1956–1957)
- James Willis (1958–1959)
- Hansjörg Eichler (1961–1962)
- Lawrence Alexander Sidney Johnson (1962–1963)
- Stanley Blake (1964–1965)
- Michael Lazarides (1965–1966)
- Arthur Bertram Court (1966–1967)
- Alex George (1967–1968)
- Donald McGillivray (1969–1970)
- John Carrick (1970–1971)
- Leslie Pedley (1971–1972)
- George Chippendale (1972–1973)
- Helen Aston (1973–1974)
- Donald Frederick Blaxell (1974–1975)
- Andrias Kanis (1975–1976)
- John Maconochie (1976–1977)
- Bruce Maslin (1977–1978)
- Rodney Henderson (1978–1979)
- Ahmad Munir (1979–1980)
- Ian Brooker (1980–1981)
- Michael Crisp (1981–1982)
- Rex Filson (1982–1983)
- Surrey Jacobs (1983–1984)
- Nicholas Lander (1984–1985)
- Clyde Dunlop (1985–1986)
- Gordon Guymer (1986–1987)
- Judith G. West (1987–1988)
- Karen Louise Wilson (1988–1989)
- Terry Desmond Macfarlane (1989–1990)
- Gregory Leach (1990–1991)
- Philip Short (1991–1992)
- Peter Weston (1992–1993)
- L.W. Jessup (1993–1994)
- Barry Conn (1994–1995)
- Robert Owen Makinson (1995–1996)
- Donald Bruce Foreman (1996–1997)
- Kenneth Hill (1997–1998)
- Alex Chapman (1998–1999)
- Robert Chinnock (1999–2000)
- Rodney Seppelt (2000–2001)
- Neville Marchant (2001–2002)
- Peter D. Bostock (2002)
- Roberta Cowan (2002–2003)
- Annette Wilson (2003–2004)
- Alex George (2004–2005)
- Juliet Wege (2005–2006)
- Jenny Tonkin (2006–2007)
- Jeremy Bruhl (2007–2008)
- Anthony Orchard (2008–2009)
