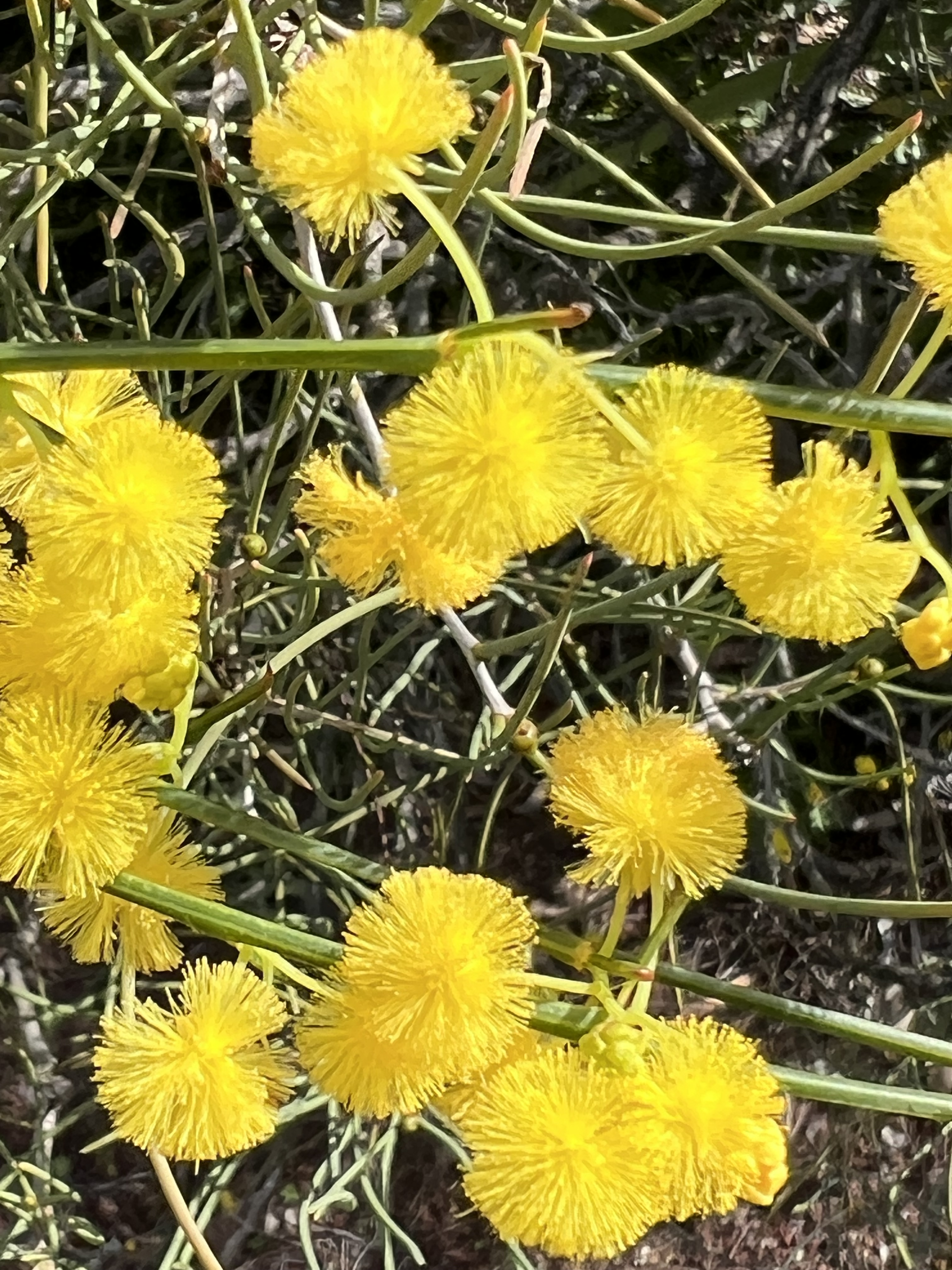

Conservation status
- Priority Four — Rare Taxa (DEC)

Scientific classification
- Kingdom: Plantae
- Clade: Tracheophytes
- Clade: Angiosperms
- Clade: Eudicots
- Clade: Rosids
- Order: Fabales
- Family: Fabaceae
- Subfamily: Caesalpinioideae
- Clade: Mimosoid clade
- Genus: Acacia
- Subgenus: Acacia subg. Phyllodineae
- Species: A. flagelliformis

Binomial name
- Acacia flagelliformis Court
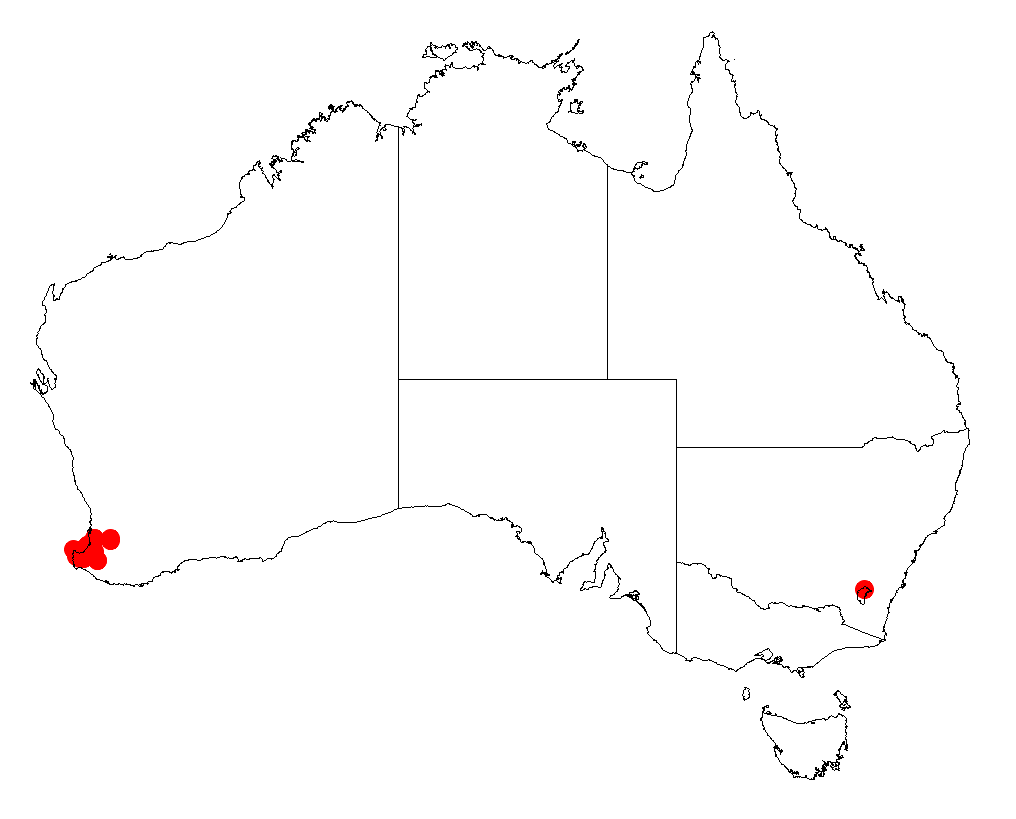
- Occurrence data from AVH

Synonyms
- Racosperma flagelliforme (Court) Pedley

= Acacia flagelliformis =

Species of legume

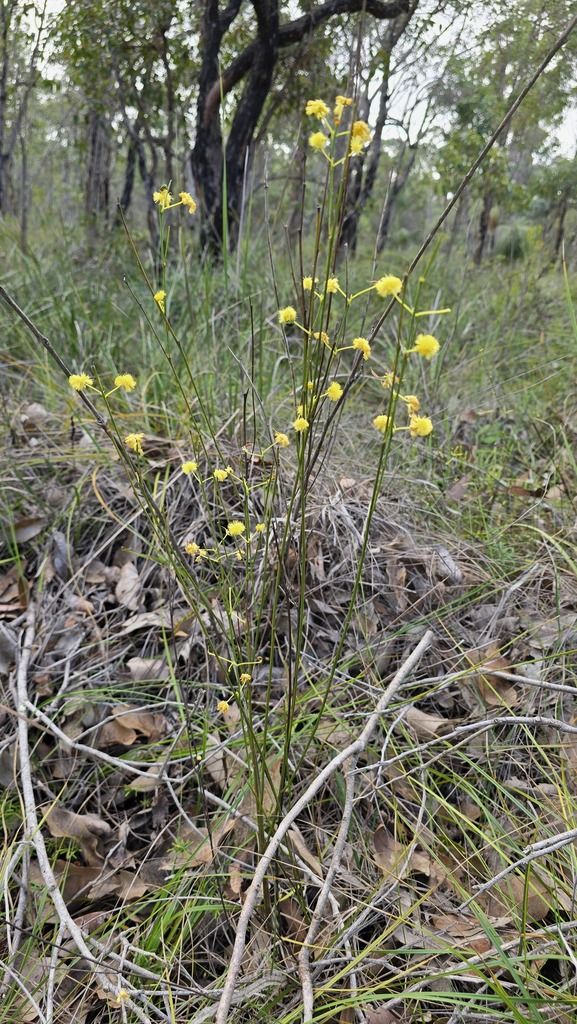
Habit

Acacia flagelliformis is a species of flowering plant in the family Fabaceae and is endemic to the south-west of Western Australia. It is an erect or sprawling, rush-like subshrub with slender stems, erect, ascending, narrowly linear phyllodes resembling the stems, spherical heads of light golden yellow flowers and tightly and narrowly oblong, crusty pods.

== Description ==
Acacia flagelliformis is an erect or sprawling, rush-like, often multi-stemmed, glabrous subshrub that typically grows to a height of up to 60 cm (24 in) and has slender, sparingly branched stems. Its phyllodes are ascending to erect, and resemble the stems. The phyllodes on the lower stems are flat, up to 110 mm (4.3 in) long and 2–5 mm (0.079–0.197 in) wide, and on the upper stems up to 15–70 mm (0.59–2.76 in) long and 0.6–1 mm (0.024–0.039 in) wide. The flowers are borne in four to nine spherical heads in axils, enclosed by conspicuous overlapping brown bracts when young. The heads are on peduncles mostly 5–10 mm (0.20–0.39 in) long, each head with six to nine, light golden yellow flowers. Flowering occurs from May to September, and the pods are narrowly oblong, crusty, up to 50 mm (2.0 in) long and 5–6 mm (0.20–0.24 in) wide. The seeds are about 3.5 mm (0.14 in) long, slightly shiny brown, with a club-shaped aril.

== Taxonomy ==
Acacia flagelliformis was first formally described in 1978 by Arthur Bertram Court in the journal Nuytsia from specimens collected by Bruce Maslin 0.6 km (0.37 mi) south of the Bussell Highway between Bunbury and Busselton in 1972. The specific epithet (flagelliformis) means 'whip-shaped, referring to the stems and phyllodes.

== Distribution and habitat ==
This species of wattle grows in swampy areas in closed scrub or closed heath and along creeks in jarrah (Eucalyptus marginata) or marri (Corymbia calophylla forest between Bunbury and Chapman Hill (about 20 km (12 mi) south of Busselton, and near Yarloop in the Jarrah Forest and Swan Coastal Plain bioregions of south-western Western Australia.

== Conservation status ==
Acacia flagelliformis is listed as "Priority Four" by the Government of Western Australia Department of Biodiversity, Conservation and Attractions, meaning that is rare or near threatened.

== See also ==
- List of Acacia species
