= Acacia gracilenta =

Scientific classification
- Kingdom: Plantae
- Clade: Tracheophytes
- Clade: Angiosperms
- Clade: Eudicots
- Clade: Rosids
- Order: Fabales
- Family: Fabaceae
- Subfamily: Caesalpinioideae
- Clade: Mimosoid clade
- Genus: Acacia
- Species: A. gracilenta

Binomial name
- Acacia gracilenta Tindale & Kodela
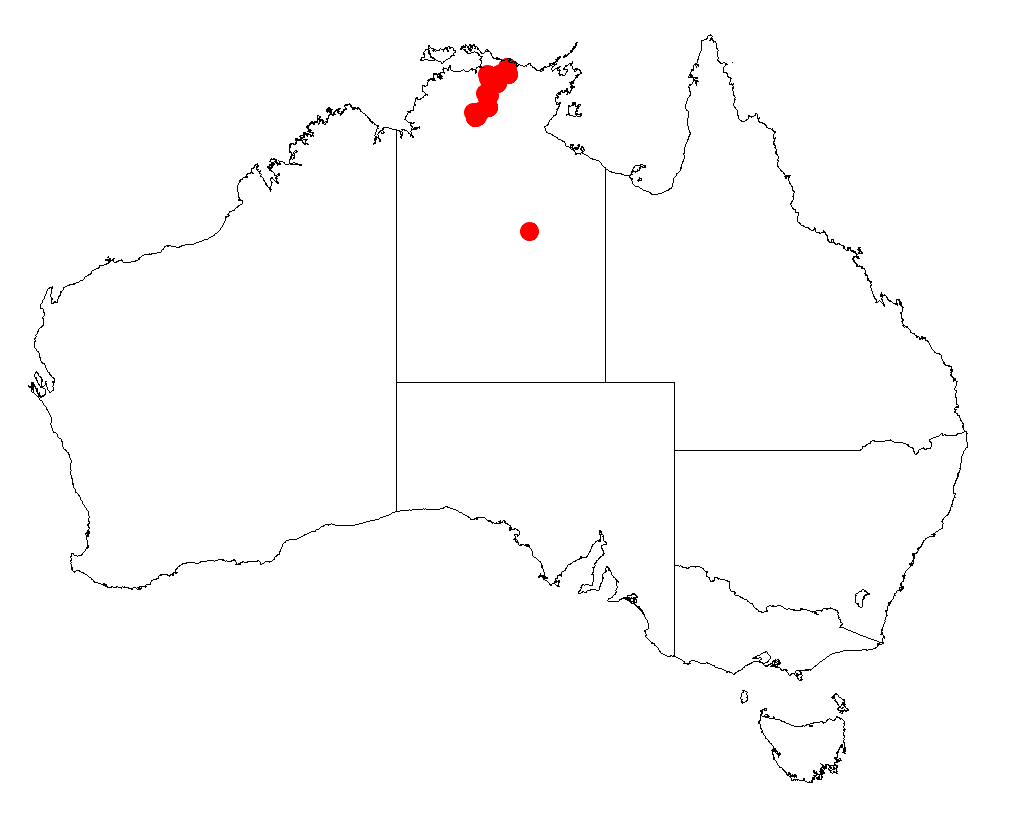
- Occurrence data from AVH

Synonyms
- Racosperma gracilentum (Tindale & Kodela) Pedley

Species of legume

Acacia gracilenta is a species of flowering plant in the family Fabaceae and is endemic to the Northern Territory, Australia. It is a sticky shrub with greyish or light brown bark and glabrous branchlets, more or less linear to very narrowly elliptic, papery phyllodes, spikes of golden yellow flowers and linear, curved pods, raised over and constricted between the seeds.

== Description ==
Acacia gracilenta is a resinous, sticky and often spindly shrub that typically grows to a height of up to 3 m (9.8 ft) and has greyish or light brown bark. Its branchlets are terete, pale to light green and sometimes covered with soft hairs. The phyllodes are more or less linear to very narrowly elliptic, straight or slightly curved, 27–102 mm (1.1–4.0 in) long, 1.4–6.5 mm (0.055–0.256 in) wide, papery and bright green. There is a prominent midvein and usually two less prominent veins on the phyllodes. The flowers are golden yellow and borne in a single spike 20–55 mm (0.79–2.17 in) long and 3.5–6.5 mm (0.14–0.26 in) wide in axils, on a peduncle 13–26 mm (0.51–1.02 in) long. Flowering has been recorded in April, May and August, and the pods are linear, curved, 20–120 mm (0.79–4.72 in) long, 2.5–4 mm (0.098–0.157 in) wide and glabrous, raised over and constricted between the seeds. The seeds have a cap-like aril folded about five times.

== Taxonomy ==
Acacia gracilenta was first formally described in 1992 by the botanists Mary Tindale and Phillip Kodela in the journal Telopea from specimens collected near the Upper East Alligator River in Arnhem Land in 1988. The specific epithet (gracilenta) refers to the rather graceful canopy of this species.

== Distribution and habitat ==
This species of wattle is endemic to the top end of the Northern Territory where it is found in Kakadu National Park and Nitmiluk National Park, often on plateaux, in gorges and on slopes in sandy soils usually near creeks or streams.

== Conservation status ==
Acacia gracilenta is listed as of "least concern" under the Northern Territory Government Territory Parks and Wildlife Conservation Act.

== See also ==
- List of Acacia species
