= Acacia producta =

Scientific classification
- Kingdom: Plantae
- Clade: Tracheophytes
- Clade: Angiosperms
- Clade: Eudicots
- Clade: Rosids
- Order: Fabales
- Family: Fabaceae
- Subfamily: Caesalpinioideae
- Clade: Mimosoid clade
- Genus: Acacia
- Species: A. producta

Binomial name
- Acacia producta Tindale
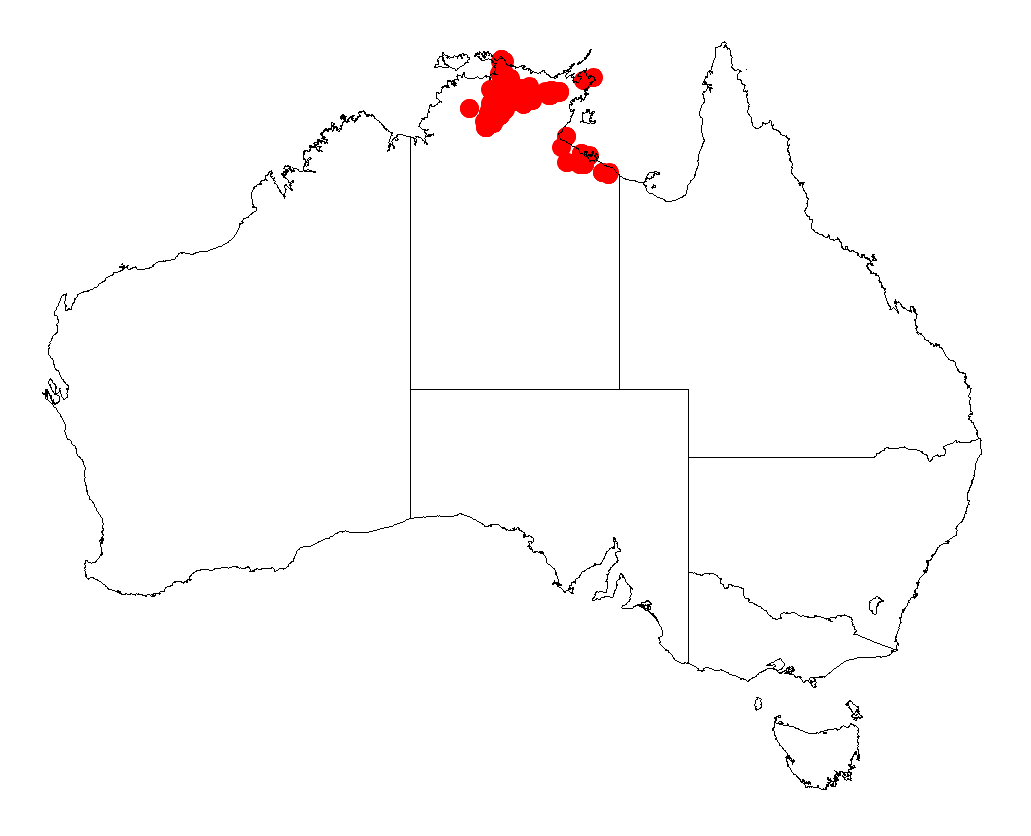
- Occurrence data from AVH

Species of legume

Acacia producta is a shrub of the genus Acacia and the subgenus Plurinerves that is endemic to northern central Australia.

== Description ==
The resinous shrub typically grows to a height of about 2 m (6 ft 7 in) and has an erect or prostrate habit with smooth dark grey coloured bark and angular branchlets that have resin-crenulated ridges. Like most species of Acacia it has phyllodes rather than true leaves. The evergreen phyllodes have an elliptic to narrowly oblanceolate shape and are straight or slightly curved. The phyllodes have a length of 3 to 8 cm (1.2 to 3.1 in) and a width of 5 to 23 mm (0.20 to 0.91 in) and have three prominent longitudinal nerves.

== Taxonomy ==
The species was first formally described by the botanist Mary Tindale in 1980 as a part of the work Notes on Australian taxa of Acacia as apublished in the journal Telopea. It was reclassified in 2003 by Leslie Pedley as Racosperma productum then returned to genus Acacia in 2006.

== Distribution ==
It is native to the top end of the Northern Territory including Maria Island in the Gulf of Carpentaria where it is usually situated on rocky sandstone pavements on plateaux or alluvial flats where it is found growing in sandy or loamy or sandy-silty soils or over around laterite as a part of Eucalyptus woodland or in heathland communities.

== See also ==
- List of Acacia species
