= Grevillea murex =

Conservation status
- Declared rare (DEC)

Scientific classification
- Kingdom: Plantae
- Clade: Tracheophytes
- Clade: Angiosperms
- Clade: Eudicots
- Order: Proteales
- Family: Proteaceae
- Genus: Grevillea
- Species: G. murex

Binomial name
- Grevillea murex McGill.

Species of shrub endemic to Western Australia

Grevillea murex is a species of flowering plant in the family Proteaceae and is endemic to a relatively small area of south-western Western Australia. It is a spreading, much-branched shrub with hand-shaped leaves and clusters of greenish-white to dull cream-coloured flowers.

== Description ==
Grevillea murex is a dense, spreading shrub that typically grows to a height of 0.8–2.0 m (2 ft 7 in – 6 ft 7 in) and has many branches, the branchlets covered with silky hairs. The leaves are erect, hand-shaped, 4–6 mm (0.16–0.24 in) long and 3–6 mm (0.12–0.24 in) wide, the 3 to 6 finger-like lobes linear to oblong, 1–8 mm (0.039–0.315 in) long and 1.0–1.5 mm (0.039–0.059 in) wide. The edges of the leaves are rolled under, enclosing most of the lower surface. The flowers are arranged in more or less dome-shaped clusters on a rachis 2–4 mm (0.079–0.157 in) long. The flowers are greenish-white to dull cream-coloured, the pistil 8–10 mm (0.31–0.39 in) long. Flowering occurs from July to October and the fruit is an oblong to elliptic follicle covered with rough projections and 9–13 mm (0.35–0.51 in) long.

== Taxonomy ==
Grevillea murex was first formally described in 1986 by Donald McGillivray in his book New Names in Grevillea (Proteaceae) from specimens collected by Bob Coveny and Bruce Maslin south-west of Three Springs in 1976. The specific epithet (murex) means "a shellfish covered with projections" referring to the fruit.

== Distribution and habitat ==
This grevillea is only known from the Morawa area in the Avon Wheatbelt bioregion of south-western Western Australia, where it grows in woodland and shrubland.

== Conservation status ==
Grevillea murex is listed as threatened by the Western Australian Government Department of Biodiversity, Conservation and Attractions, meaning that it is in danger of extinction.

== See also ==
- List of Grevillea species
