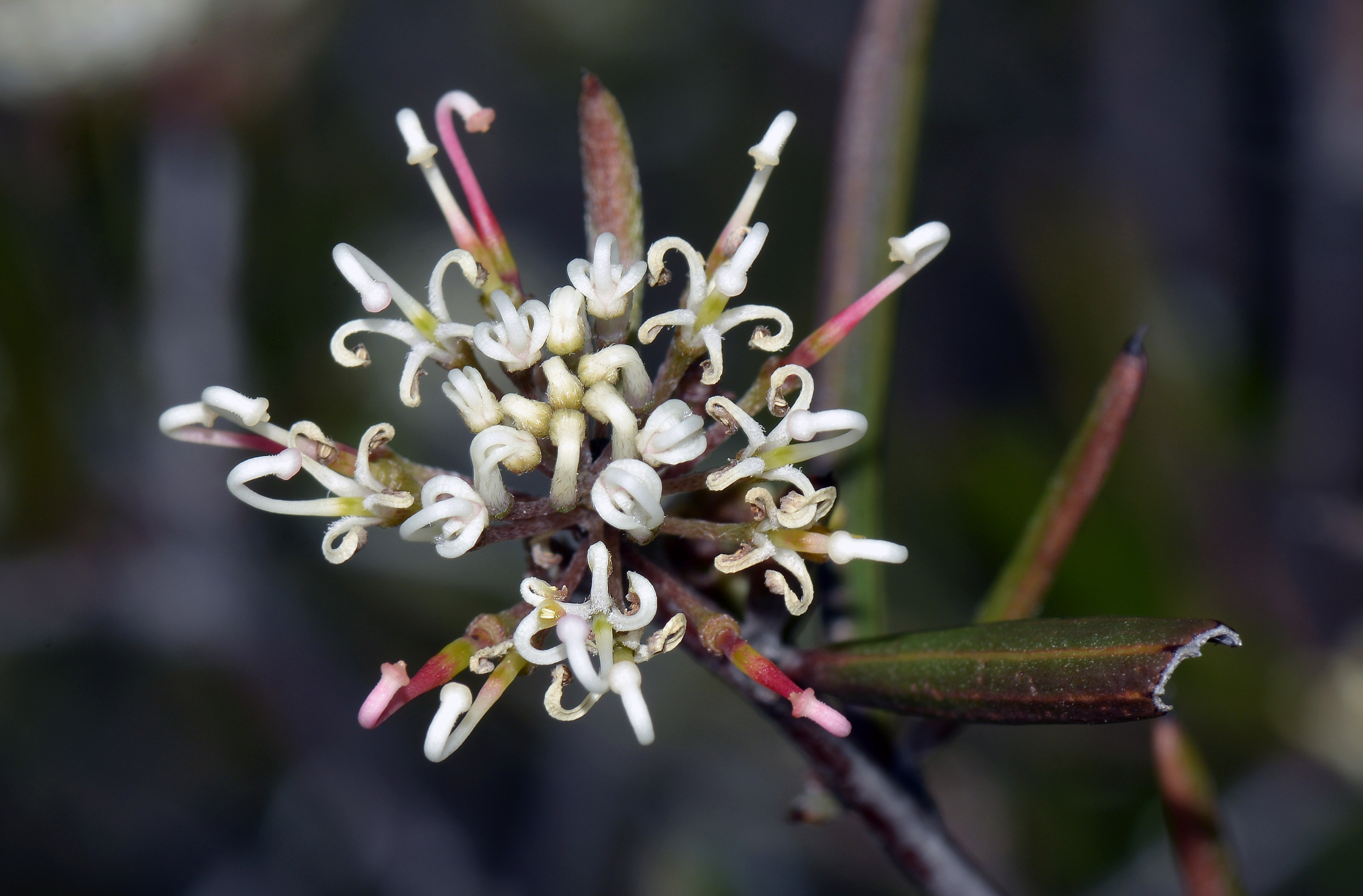

Conservation status
- Endangered (EPBC Act)

- Vulnerable (IUCN 3.1)

Scientific classification
- Kingdom: Plantae
- Clade: Embryophytes
- Clade: Tracheophytes
- Clade: Spermatophytes
- Clade: Angiosperms
- Clade: Eudicots
- Order: Proteales
- Family: Proteaceae
- Genus: Grevillea
- Species: G. christineae

Binomial name
- Grevillea christineae McGill.

= Grevillea christineae =

Christine's grevillea

Species of shrub endemic to Western Australia

Grevillea christineae, commonly known as Christine's grevillea, is a species of flowering plant in the family Proteaceae and is endemic to the south-west of Western Australia. It is an erect, rounded shrub with wiry branches, linear to narrowly elliptic leaves, and white flowers.

== Description ==
Grevillea christineae is an erect, rounded shrub that typically grows to a height of 0.5–1 m (1 ft 8 in – 3 ft 3 in) and has wiry, zig-zagging branchlets. Its leaves are linear to narrowly elliptic, 20–60 mm (0.79–2.36 in) long and 1–6.5 mm (0.039–0.256 in) wide, with the edges rolled under and both surfaces more or less glabrous. The flowers are arranged in groups of eight to twelve in leaf axils or on the ends of branchlets and are white, sometimes turning pink or red as they age, the pistil 7.0–8.5 mm (0.28–0.33 in) long. Flowering occurs in August and September and the fruit is a narrowly oval follicle 10–15 mm (0.39–0.59 in) long.

== Taxonomy ==
Grevillea christineae was first formally described in 1986 by Donald McGillivray in his book New Names in Grevillea (Proteaceae) from specimens collected in 1979 near Goomalling by Alex George. The specific epithet (christineae) honours Christine Cornish, who assisted McGillivray.

== Distribution and habitat ==
Grevillea christineae grows in woodland and shrubland in scattered populations between Watheroo and Goomalling in the Avon Wheatbelt, Geraldton Sandplains and Jarrah Forest biogeographic regions of south-western Western Australia.

== Conservation status ==
This species is listed endangered under the Australian Government Environment Protection and Biodiversity Conservation Act 1999, vulnerable on the IUCN Red List and as threatened by the Western Australian Government Department of Parks and Wildlife, meaning that it is in danger of extinction. The main threats to the species are damage or clearing during road maintenance work, inappropriate fire regimes and rubbish dumping. Other threats to this species include vegetation clearing, competition from invasive weeds and changed hydrology, including salinity. It may also be susceptible to dieback disease from the plant pathogen Phytophthora cinnamomi.
