= Roberta Ann Townsend =

Australian botanist

Roberta Ann Townsend (born 1954) is an Australian botanist, phycologist and archivist. She is also known as a plant collector under the name Roberta Ann Cowan.

== Life ==
Townsend was born in 1954 in Melbourne, Victoria. She completed a BSc (hons) in 1976 at the University of Melbourne. She later graduated from the University of Sydney in with a PhD for her thesis "The Sporolithaceae : its place in the Florideophycidae" in 1995.

In 1994 Townsend's interest in researching algae led her to edit the Australian Marine Algal Name Index.

She married American botanist Richard Sumner Cowan in 1986. Together they collected many plant species.

During 2002 and 2003 she served as the Australian Botanical Liaison Officer at the Royal Botanic Gardens in London, England.

As of 2023 Townsend is working at the Western Australian Herbarium on coralline algae.
