= Prostanthera carrickiana =

Carrick's mintbush

Conservation status
- Priority Four — Rare Taxa (DEC)

Scientific classification
- Kingdom: Plantae
- Clade: Tracheophytes
- Clade: Angiosperms
- Clade: Eudicots
- Clade: Asterids
- Order: Lamiales
- Family: Lamiaceae
- Genus: Prostanthera
- Species: P. carrickiana

Binomial name
- Prostanthera carrickiana B.J.Conn
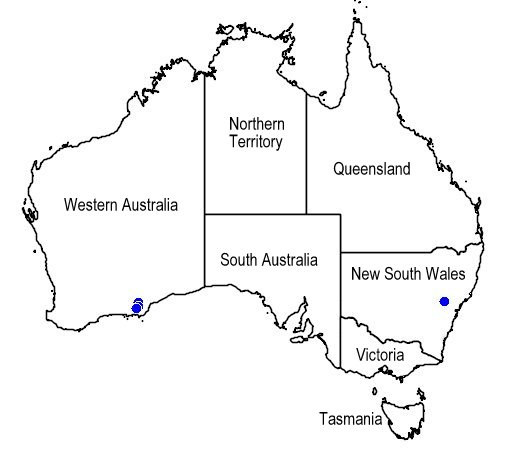

Species of flowering plant

Prostanthera carrickiana, commonly known as Carrick's mintbush, is a species of flowering plant in the family Lamiaceae and is endemic to a restricted area in the south-west of Western Australia. It is an erect shrub with hairy branchlets, elliptical leaves pinkish-red flowers.

== Description ==
Prostanthera carrickiana is an erect shrub that typically grows to a height of 0.5–1 m (1 ft 8 in – 3 ft 3 in) and has cylindrical, densely hairy branchlets. The leaves are elliptical, glabrous, 13–14 mm (0.51–0.55 in) long, 5.5–8 mm (0.22–0.31 in) wide on a petiole 0.7–1 mm (0.028–0.039 in) long. The flowers are arranged singly in two to six leaf axils near the ends of branchlets, each flower on a pedicel 2.5–2.8 mm (0.098–0.110 in) long. The sepals are green, 6.5–7.5 mm (0.26–0.30 in) long and form a tube 4.5–6 mm (0.18–0.24 in) long with two lobes about 2 mm (0.079 in) long and 3.5–4 mm (0.14–0.16 in) wide. The petals are pinkish-red, 23–26 mm (0.91–1.02 in) long and form a tube 13–15 mm (0.51–0.59 in) long. The lower lip has three lobes, the centre lobe broadly egg-shaped and concave, 2.5–3.5 mm (0.098–0.138 in) long and 3.5–4 mm (0.14–0.16 in) wide and the side lobes 1.5–2 mm (0.059–0.079 in) long and 2.5–4 mm (0.098–0.157 in) wide. The upper lip has two egg-shaped lobes 6–6.5 mm (0.24–0.26 in) long and 8–10 mm (0.31–0.39 in) wide. Flowering occurs from April to May.

== Taxonomy ==
Prostanthera carrickiana was first formally described in 1987 by Barry Conn in the journal Muelleria from specimens collected in the Clyde Hill Nature Reserve. The specific epithet honours the botanist John Carrick.

== Distribution and habitat ==
Carrick's mintbush grows in mallee with a low shrubby understorey but is only known from the Clyde Hill Nature Reserve in the Mallee biogeographic region.

== Conservation status ==
Prostanthera carrickiana is classified as "Priority Four" by the Government of Western Australia Department of Parks and Wildlife, meaning that is rare or near threatened.
