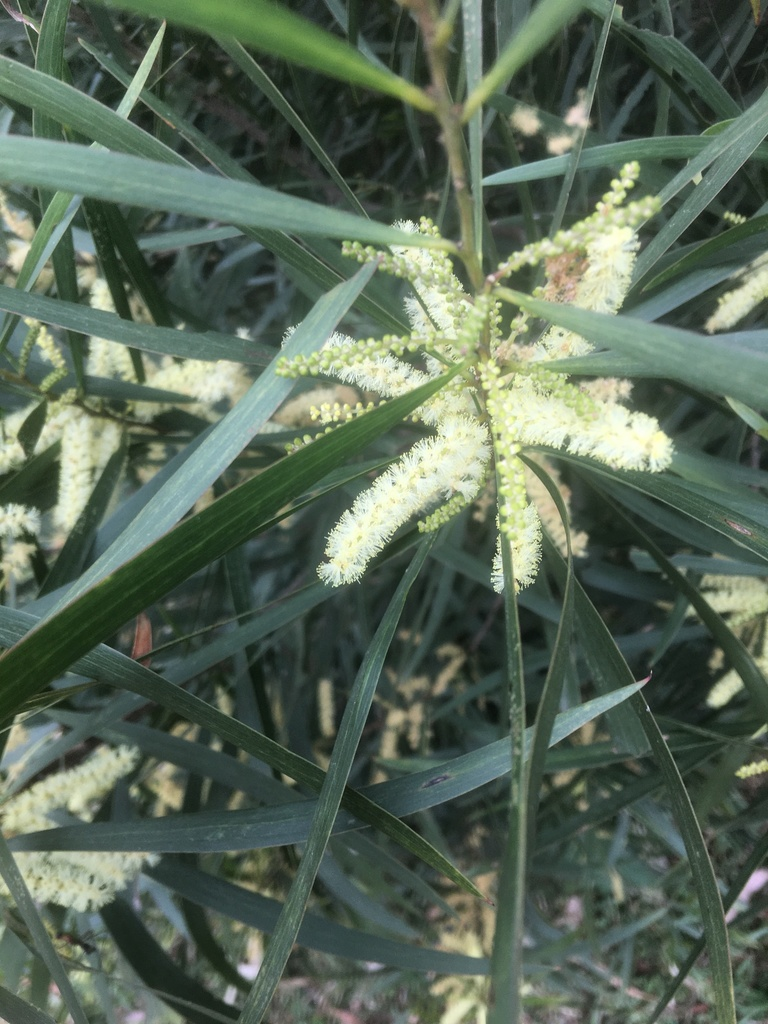
- Near Springbrook

Scientific classification
- Kingdom: Plantae
- Clade: Tracheophytes
- Clade: Angiosperms
- Clade: Eudicots
- Clade: Rosids
- Order: Fabales
- Family: Fabaceae
- Subfamily: Caesalpinioideae
- Clade: Mimosoid clade
- Genus: Acacia
- Species: A. orites

Binomial name
- Acacia orites Pedley
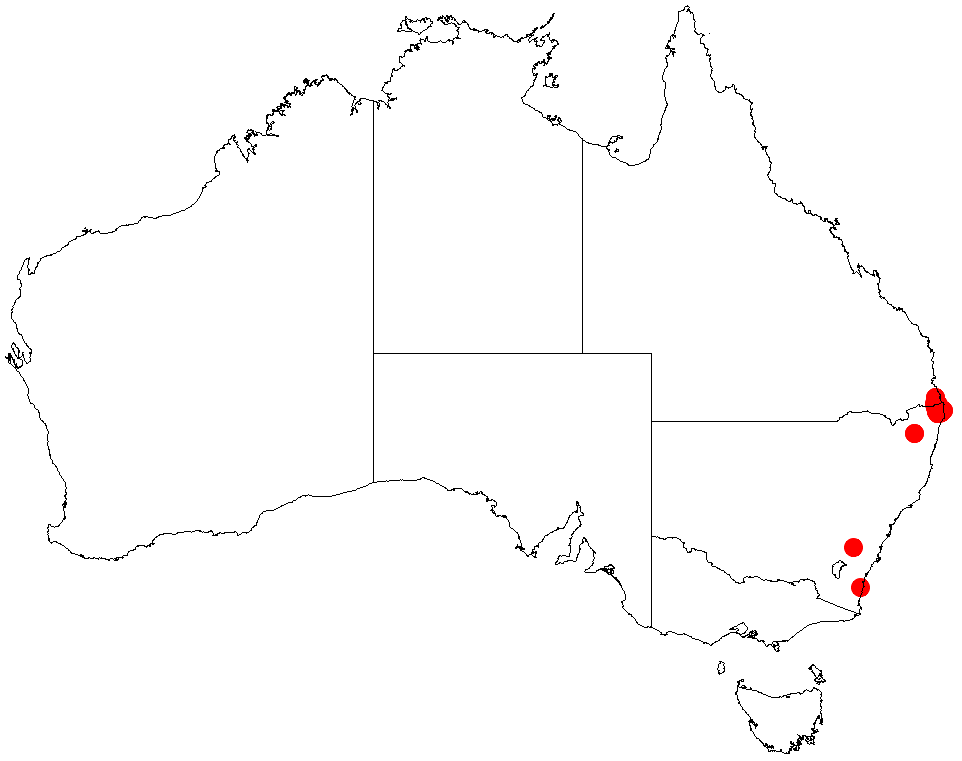
- Occurrence data from AVH

= Acacia orites =

Mountain wattle

Species of legume

Acacia orites, also commonly known as mountain wattle, is a species of flowering plant in the family Fabaceae, and is endemic to south-eastern mainland Australia. It is an erect or spreading tree with smooth bark, angled or flattened branchlets, linear or slightly sickle-shaped, thin and pliable phyllodes, paired spikes of pale or creamy yellow flowers and linear, thinly crusty, glabrous pods.

== Description ==
Acacia orites is an erect or spreading tree that typically grows to a height of up to 30 m (98 ft) and has brownish and/or grey bark and angled or flattened branches with a few hairs pressed against the surface. Its phyllodes are very narrowly elliptic to linear, straight or slightly sickle-shaped, thin and pliable, 100–200 mm (3.9–7.9 in) long, 4–9 mm (0.16–0.35 in) wide, dark green with up to three more prominent veins and a minute gland up to 8 mm (0.31 in) above the pulvinus. The flowers are pale or creamy yellow and borne in commonly paired spikes 30–60 mm (1.2–2.4 in) long on peduncles about 3 mm (0.12 in) long. Flowering occurs in August and September, and the pods are linear, thinly crusty, 30–100 mm (1.2–3.9 in) long, 3.5–5 mm (0.14–0.20 in) wide, glabrous and slightly constricted between the seeds. The seeds are narrowly elliptic, 3.5–4.5 mm (0.14–0.18 in) long with a top-shaped aril.

== Taxonomy ==
Acacia orites was first formally described in 1964 by Leslie Pedley in the Proceedings of the Royal Society of Queensland from speciems collected by William Thomas Jones (1908–1970) on Peach Mountain in the Whian Whian State Forest in 1963. The specific epithet (orites) means 'a mountaineer', referring to the species occurrence on high ranges.

== Distribution and habitat ==
This species of wattle grows in wet forests and on the edges of rainforest mainly north from the Whian Whian State Forest near Lismore and in the Washpool National Park in New South Wales, to south-eastern Queensland.

== See also ==
- List of Acacia species
