= Arthur Bertram Court =

Arthur Bertram Court (25 December 1927 – 18 May 2012) was an Australian botanist

He grew up in the Dandenong Ranges in Victoria where he became interested in local flora especially ferns and orchids. Court graduated and received his Bachelor of Science from the University of Melbourne.

Employed at the Department of Crown Lands and Survey in Victoria then at the National Herbarium of Victoria he became the botanist in 1957. He collected extensively in Victoria and South Australia, particularly species of Acacia. His written works included the family Mimosaceae section in J.H. Willis's Handbook to the Plants of Victoria. From 1966 to 1967 he was the Australian Botanical Liaison Officer at Kew Gardens.

In 1974 Court was employed as the Curator of the Herbarium at Canberra Botanic Gardens and was later promoted to assistant director of the National Collections of the Australian National Botanic Gardens in 1983 until he retired in 1989.

During his career he published work in several journals including Victorian Naturalist, Muelleria and Nuytsia.

Acacia courtii was named by Mary Tindale and Clare Herscovitch in honour of Court's achievements.
