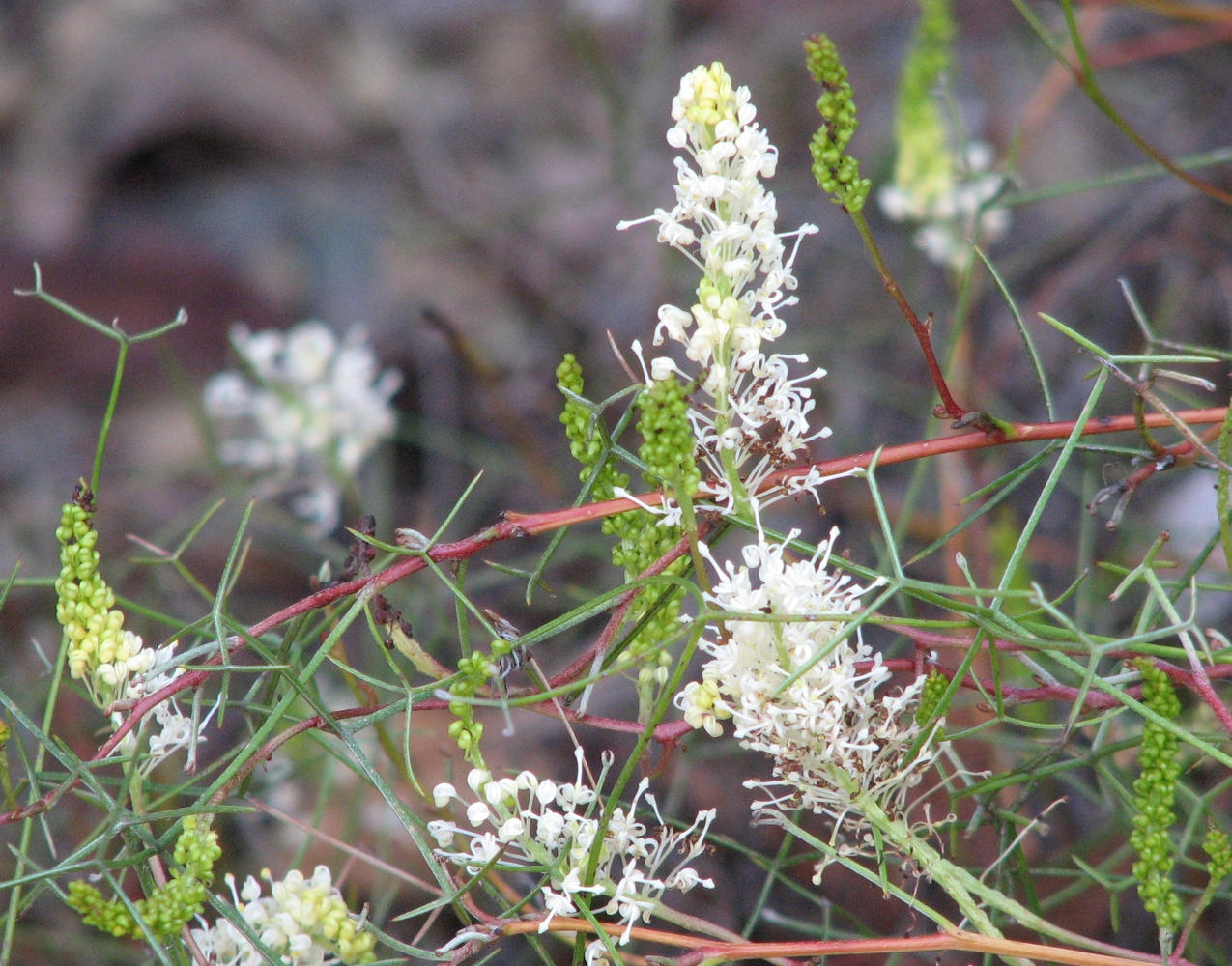
- In Maranoa Gardens

Conservation status
- Endangered (IUCN 3.1)

Scientific classification
- Kingdom: Plantae
- Clade: Embryophytes
- Clade: Tracheophytes
- Clade: Angiosperms
- Clade: Eudicots
- Order: Proteales
- Family: Proteaceae
- Genus: Grevillea
- Species: G. intricata

Binomial name
- Grevillea intricata Meisn.

= Grevillea intricata =

Species of flowering plant

Grevillea intricata is a species of flowering plant in the family Proteaceae and is endemic to the west of Western Australia. It is a densely-branched shrub with tangled branchlets, divided leaves with linear lobes and clusters of pale greenish-white to light cream-coloured flowers.

== Description ==
Grevillea intricata is a densely branched shrub that typically grows to a height of 0.5–3 m (1 ft 8 in – 9 ft 10 in) and has tangled foliage. Its leaves are 80–160 mm (3.1–6.3 in) long and divided with widely-spreading linear lobes, the end lobes 20–80 mm (0.79–3.15 in) long and 0.4–1.1 mm (0.016–0.043 in) wide. The flowers are pale greenish-white to light cream-coloured and are arranged in sometimes branched clusters, each branch oval to narrowly conical on a rachis 50–80 mm (2.0–3.1 in) long, the pistil 4.5–5.5 mm (0.18–0.22 in) long. Flowering occurs from May to October and the fruit is a knobbly, oblong follicle 11–15 mm (0.43–0.59 in) long.

== Taxonomy ==
Grevillea intricata was first formally described by botanist Carl Meissner in Hooker's Journal of Botany and Kew Garden Miscellany based on material collected by James Drummond. The specific epithet (intricata) means "entangled".

== Distribution and habitat ==
This grevillea grows in heath, or tall shrubland and mallee shrubland between Northampton, Ajana and the Chapman East River in the Geraldton Sandplains bioregion in the west of Western Australia.

== Conservation status ==
Grevillea intricata is listed as 'Not threatened' by the Government of Western Australia Department of Biodiversity, Conservation and Attractions, but as 'Endangered' by the IUCN Red List.
