= Donald McGillivray (botanist) =

Australian botanist (1935–2012)

- Born: Donald John McGillivray; 20 August 1935; Griffith, New South Wales, Australia
- Died: 17 August 2012 (aged 76)
- Education: Gosford High School
- Alma mater: University of Sydney; Australian National University
- Awards: Engler Medal (1993)
- Scientific career
- Fields: Botany
- Institutions: Royal Botanic Gardens, Sydney
- Author abbrev. (botany): McGill.

Donald John McGillivray (20 August 1935 – 17 August 2012) in New South Wales, Australia, usually known as D. J. McGillivray, was an Australian botanical taxonomist. He was trained in forestry, and became interested in plant taxonomy just before he transferred in 1964 to the National Herbarium of the Royal Botanic Gardens in Sydney.

From 1969 to 1970, he was the Australian Botanical Liaison Officer at the Royal Botanic Gardens in Kew, London.

McGillivray specialised in the Grevillea genus and, in 1993, published Grevillea – Proteaceae: A Taxonomic Revision, a definitive scientific survey of the prolific Australian plant genus.

Government offices
| Preceded by A. S. George | Australian Botanical Liaison Officer; 1969–1970 | Succeeded by John Carrick |
