= John Carrick (botanist) =

- Born: 14 June 1914; Glasgow, Scotland
- Died: 4 January 1978 (aged 63); Adelaide, South Australia
- Education: University of Glasgow
- Scientific career
- Fields: Botany
- Author abbrev. (botany): Carrick

John Carrick (14 June 1914 – 4 January 1978) was a botanist and the author of a number of plant names. He was born in Glasgow and died in Australia. He worked at the University of Malaya from 1952 to 1967 and then became a botanist at the South Australian State Herbarium.

The mintbush, Prostanthera carrickiana was named in his honour.
