= Mary Tindale =

Australian botanist

Mary Douglas Tindale
- Born: 19 September 1920; Randwick
- Died: 31 March 2011 (aged 90); Sydney
- Education: Sydney University
- Employer: Royal Botanic Gardens
- Known for: Botany
- Title: Dr

Mary Douglas Tindale (19 September 1920 – 31 March 2011) was an Australia Australian botanist. She was an Australian botanist specialising in pteridology (ferns) and the genera Acacia and Glycine. She devoted her life to the study of ferns, and her name is widely associated with the group of flowerless plants.

== Early life and career ==
Tindale was born in Randwick, New South Wales, the only child of George Harold Tindale and Grace Matilda Tindale. She attended primary school in New York while her father served as British Ambassador to the United States. She returned to Sydney, Australia to attend high school at Abbotsleigh.

Tindale earned a B.Sc. in botany with Honours from Sydney University, as well as a master's degree from the same university. She became Assistant Botanist at the Royal Botanic Gardens, Sydney in 1944 and later served as the Australian Botanical Liaison Officer at the Royal Botanic Gardens, Kew from 1949 to 1951. After completing her Doctor of Science at Sydney University in 1964, she was appointed the first principal research scientist at NSW Public Works. She retired from the Gardens in Sydney in 1983 after 39 years of service there.

Tindale died in 2011.

== Research ==
Tindale worked on the genera Glycine and Acacia. She was the first officer within NSW in the public service to be given the position of a Principal Research Scientist. She was an authority on both wattles and the native soya bean, known as Glycine. Tindale was an author of the 4th edition of the book called Flora of the Sydney Region (1994). She served on numerous international committees for ferns, and was a member of the Special Committee for Pteridophytes in the International Bureau of Plant Taxonomy and Nomenclature from the years of 1965 to 2005. In addition she was the secretary of the Systematic Botany Committee of ANZAAS. 49 taxon names have been authored by Mary Douglas Tindale and she contributed to ten books on botany.

== Gender ==
Tindale was reported to attend 'as many international botanical congresses as possible'.

"She lived through the era of elegant gowns and romantic dances and confessed she loved dancing the tango. She seemed proud of never having married - in those days, ''one had to give up work as soon as one married'' - and was proud to be a woman with an important academic career." ... "Tindale's assistants at the Botanic Gardens were mostly men. She was an exacting boss who kept them on their toes, toughening them up for their botanical careers."

Reporting on her career and also preparation, the Council of Heads of Australasian Herbaria Australian National Herbarium - Biographical Notes, states that,

"She was slapdash with her lipstick but prepared for every eventuality - on one occasion at a grand function, where there wasn't enough light to read the menu, she reached into her bag and got out a magnifying glass and a large torch."

== Publications ==
- Tindale, M.D. 1962. A new species of the Acacia decurrens group from New South Wales. Contributions from the New South Wales National Herbarium 3(3): 127. Reference page.
- Tindale, M.D. 1963. Studies in Australian Pteridophytes. No. 4. Contributions from the New South Wales National Herbarium 3(4): 245–248.
- Tindale, M.D. 1975. Notes on Australian taxa of Acacia No. 4. Telopea 1(1): 68–83. DOI:10.7751/telopea19753110
- Tindale, M.D. & Kodela, P.G. 1992. New species of Acacia (Fabaceae : Mimosoideae) from tropical Australia. Telopea 5(1) 53–66. DOI: 10.7751/telopea19924961
- Tindale, M.D. & Kodela, P.G. 1996. Acacia valida (Fabaceae, Mimosoideae), a new species from Western Australia and the Northern Territory, as well as the typification and revision of A. pachyphloia. Australian Systematic Botany 9(3): 307–317. DOI: 10.1071/SB9960307
- Tindale, M.D., Bedward, M. & Kodela, P.G. 1996. Acacia multistipulosa and A. rigescens (Fabaceae: Mimosoideae, Acacia sect. Juliflorae), two new species from the Northern Territory, Australia. Australian Systematic Botany 9(6): 859–866. DOI: 10.1071/SB9960859.
- Pfeil, B.E. & Tindale, M.D. 2001. A review of the Glycine clandestina species complex (Fabaceae: Phaseolae) reveals two new species. Australian Systematic Botany 14: 891–900. DOI: 10.1071/SB00041.

== Awards and recognition ==
- 1948 - Linnean Macleay Fellowship (Botany), for study at the University of Sydney
- 1968-1983 - Editor, Contributions from the New South Wales National Herbarium
