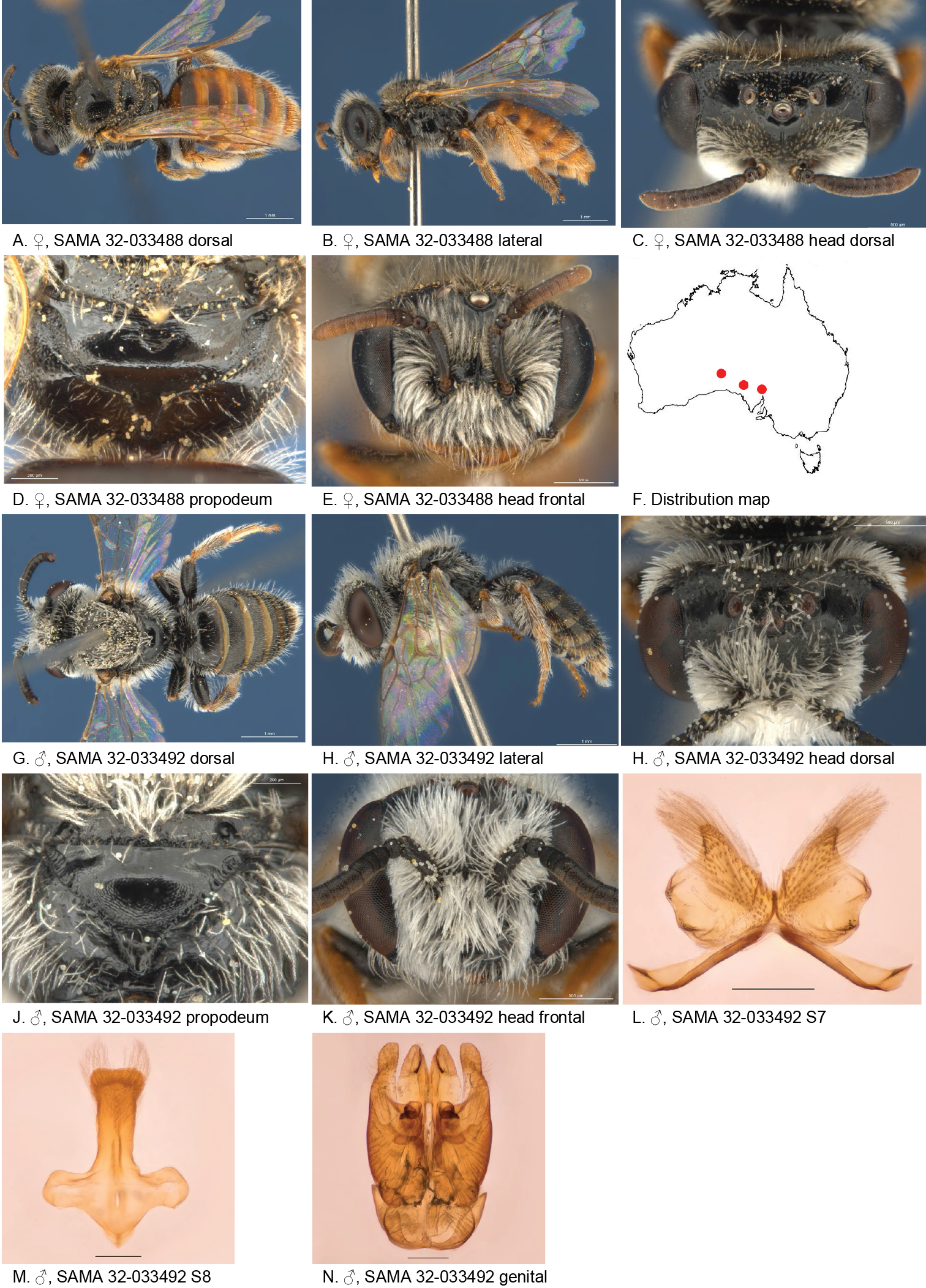
- Female holotype and male allotype

Scientific classification
- Kingdom: Animalia
- Phylum: Arthropoda
- Clade: Pancrustacea
- Class: Insecta
- Order: Hymenoptera
- Family: Colletidae
- Genus: Leioproctus
- Species: L. rubicundus

Binomial name
- Leioproctus rubicundus Leijs 2018

= Leioproctus rubicundus =

Species of bee

Leioproctus rubicundus, or Leioproctus (Colletellus) rubicundus, is a species of bee in the family Colletidae and subfamily Colletinae. It is endemic to Australia. It was described by entomologist Remko Leijs in 2018.

== Etymology ==
The specific epithet rubicundus refers to the colour of the female metasoma.

== Description ==
The female holotype body length is 6.1 mm, head width 2.1 mm; the male allotype body length is 5.5 mm, head width 1.7 mm. Integumental colouration is mainly black, orange and brown; the female metasoma is orange, that of the male black. The hair is white.

== Distribution and habitat ==
The species occurs in southern inland Australia. The type locality is Bon Bon Station in South Australia.

== Behaviour ==
The adults are flying mellivores. Flowering plants visited by the bees include Angianthus brachypappus as well as Gunniopsis species.

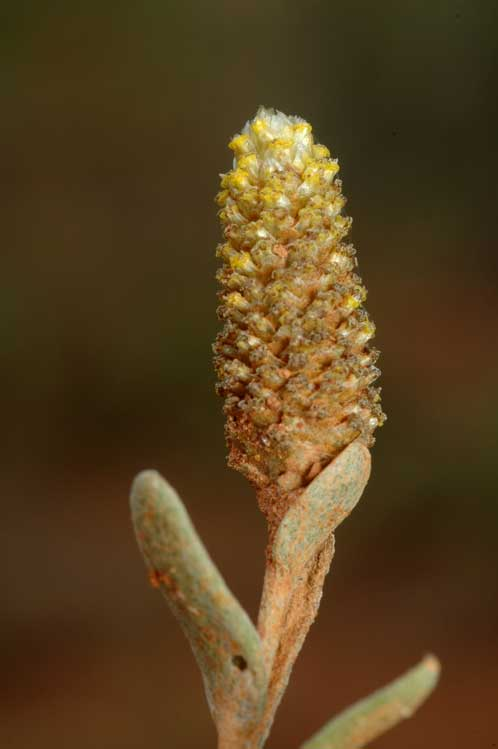
Flowers of Angianthus brachypappus

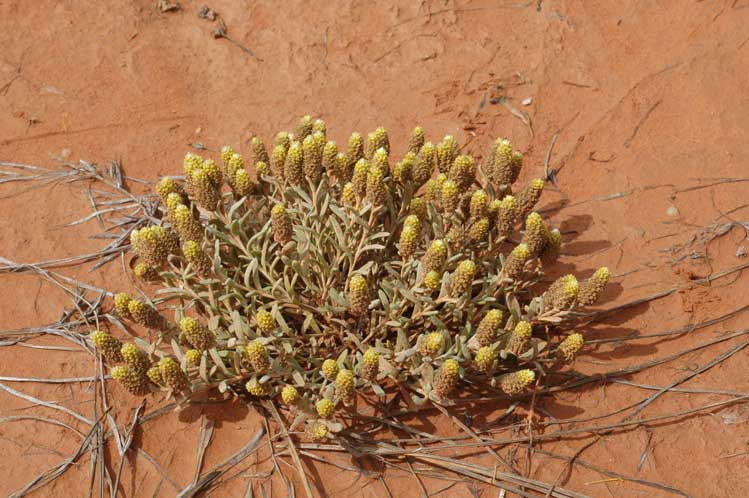
Angianthus brachypappus (spreading cup-flower), a forage plant of the bees
