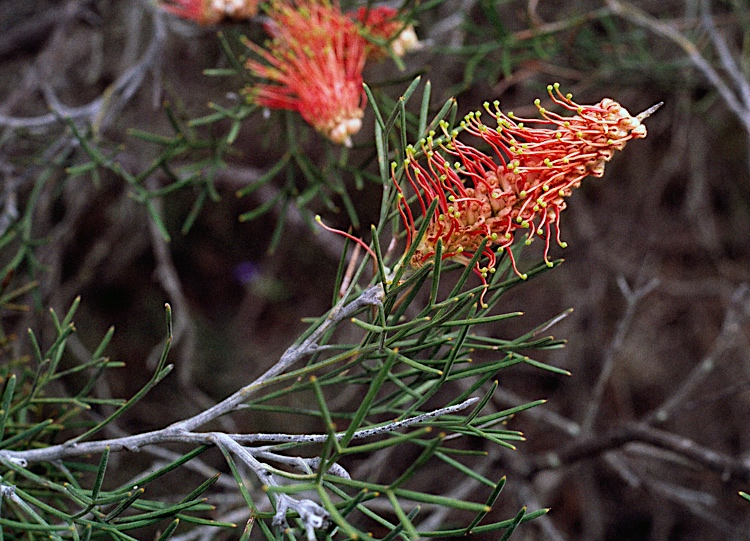
- Near Lake King

Conservation status
- Vulnerable (IUCN 3.1)

Scientific classification
- Kingdom: Plantae
- Clade: Tracheophytes
- Clade: Angiosperms
- Clade: Eudicots
- Order: Proteales
- Family: Proteaceae
- Genus: Grevillea
- Species: G. wittweri

Binomial name
- Grevillea wittweri McGill.

= Grevillea wittweri =

Species of shrub endemic to Western Australia

Grevillea wittweri is a species of flowering plant in the family Proteaceae and is endemic to the southwest of Western Australia. It is a shrub with pinnatipartite leaves, and clusters of greenish to fawn flowers with a crimson style.

== Description ==
Grevillea wittweri is a moderately dense, spreading shrub that typically grows to a height of 1.0–2.2 m (3 ft 3 in – 7 ft 3 in). Its leaves are 40–80 mm (1.6–3.1 in) long and pinnatipartite with 3 to 8 lobes that are usually divided again, the end-lobes linear, 5–35 mm (0.20–1.38 in) long, 0.8–1.2 mm (0.031–0.047 in) wide and sharply pointed. The edges of the leaves are rolled under, concealing the lower surface, apart from the mid-vein. The flowers are arranged in erect clusters on one side of a rachis 50–75 mm (2.0–3.0 in) long, the flowers greenish to fawn-pink with a crimson to light burgundy style, the pistil 18–21 mm (0.71–0.83 in) long. Flowering occurs from September to April and the fruit is an oblong or ovoid follicle 12–14 mm (0.47–0.55 in) long and covered with woolly, glandular hairs.

== Taxonomy ==
Grevillea wittweri was first formally described by the botanist Donald McGillivray in 1986 his book, New Names in Grevillea (Proteaceae) from specimens collected near Lake Cairlocup by Kenneth Newbey in 1975. The specific epithet (wittweri) honours Ernst Wittwer, the superintendent of Kings Park, Perth from 1974 to 1980.

== Distribution ==
This grevillea has a scattered distribution in the area between Gnowangerup, Newdegate, Lake Johnston and Ravensthorpe in the Coolgardie, Esperance Plains and Mallee bioregions of south-western Western Australia. It grows in shrubland on sandplains, often around salt lakes.

== Conservation status ==
Grevillea wittweri is listed as "not threatened" by the Government of Western Australia Department of Biodiversity, Conservation and Attractions but as "vulnerable" by the International Union for Conservation of Nature.

== See also ==
- List of Grevillea species
