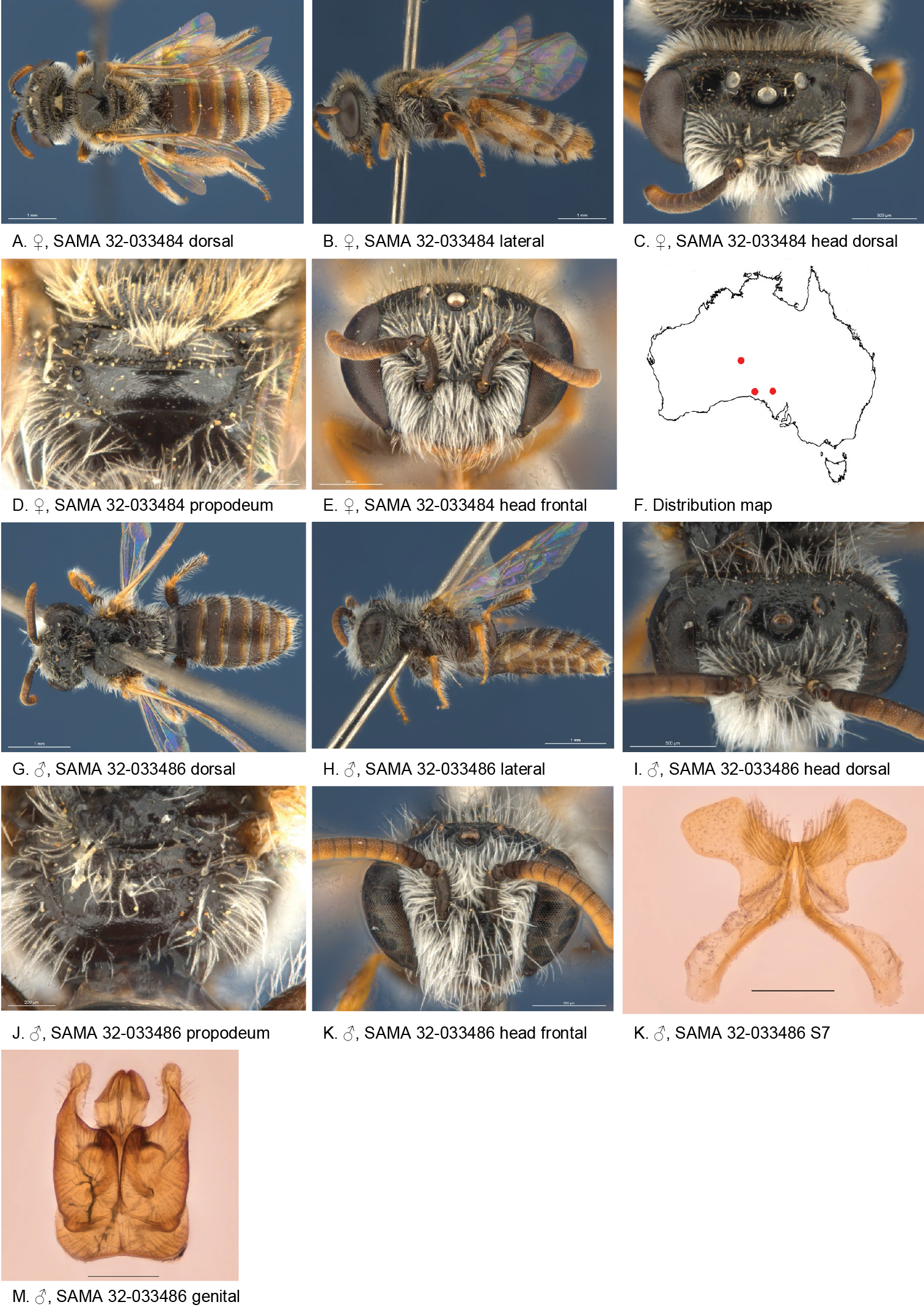
- Female holotype and male allotype

Scientific classification
- Kingdom: Animalia
- Phylum: Arthropoda
- Clade: Pancrustacea
- Class: Insecta
- Order: Hymenoptera
- Family: Colletidae
- Genus: Leioproctus
- Species: L. laciniosus

Binomial name
- Leioproctus laciniosus Leijs 2018

= Leioproctus laciniosus =

Species of bee

Leioproctus laciniosus, or Leioproctus (Colletellus) laciniosus, is a species of bee in the family Colletidae and subfamily Colletinae. It is endemic to Australia. It was described by entomologist Remko Leijs in 2018.

== Etymology ==
The specific epithet laciniosus is an anatomical reference to the fringe of white hairs on the posterior T2–4.

== Description ==
The female holotype body length is 5.6 mm, head width 1.9 mm; male allotype body length is 4.4 mm, head width 1.6 mm. Integumental colouration is mainly black and orange-brown. The hair is mostly white.

== Distribution and habitat ==
The species occurs in arid central and southern inland Australia. The type locality is Bon Bon Station.

== Behaviour ==
The adults are flying mellivores. Flowering plants visited by the bees include Angianthus brachypappus.

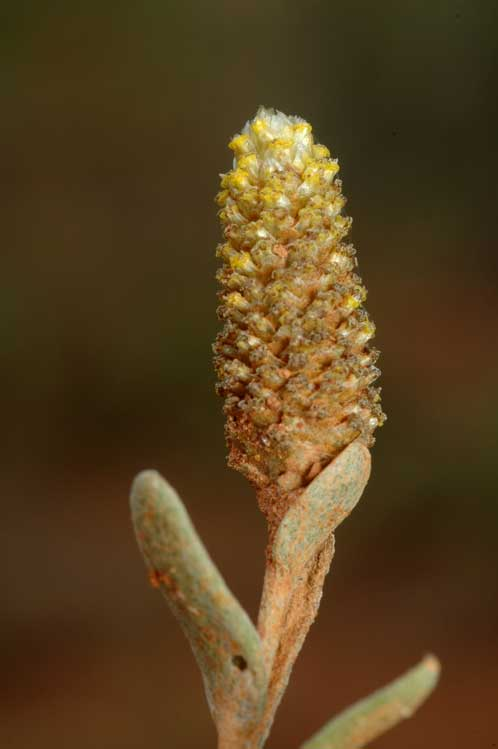
Angianthus brachypappus flower

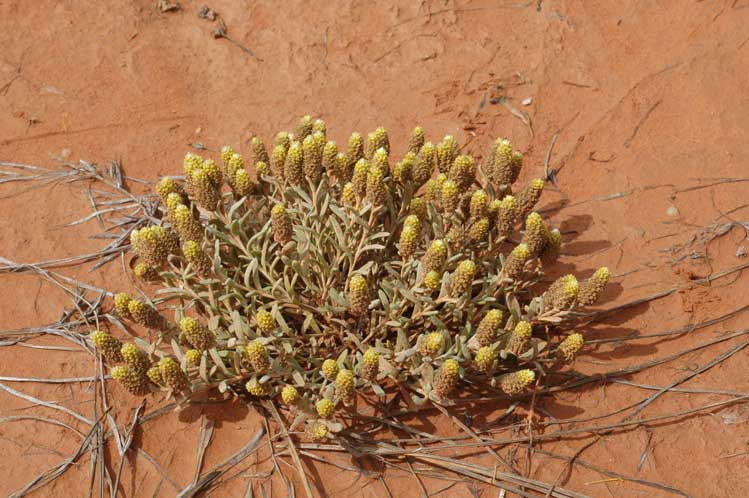
Angianthus brachypappus (spreading cup-flower), a forage plant of the bees
