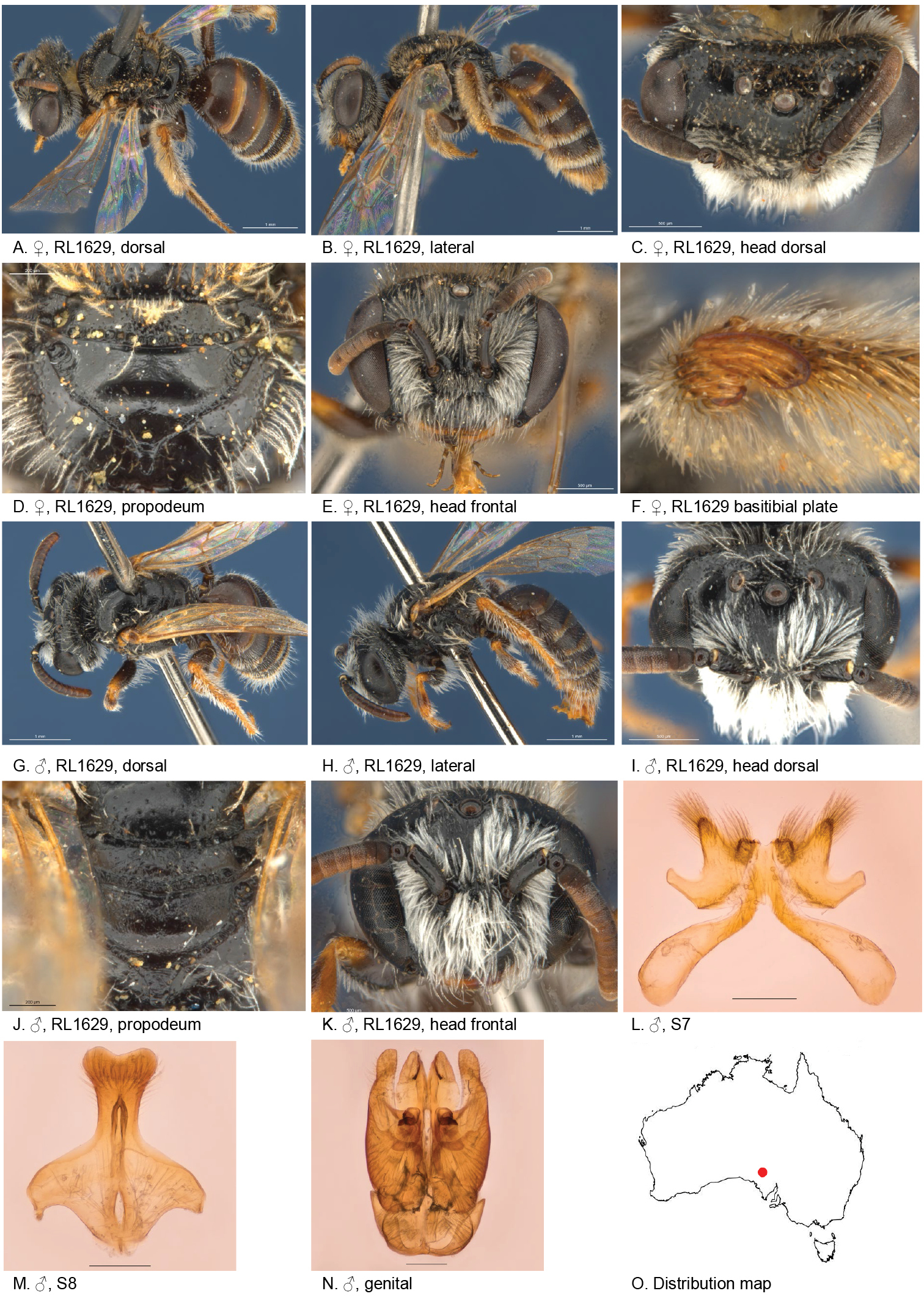
- Female holotype and male allotype

Scientific classification
- Kingdom: Animalia
- Phylum: Arthropoda
- Clade: Pancrustacea
- Class: Insecta
- Order: Hymenoptera
- Family: Colletidae
- Genus: Leioproctus
- Species: L. aberrans

Binomial name
- Leioproctus aberrans Leijs 2018

= Leioproctus aberrans =

Species of bee

Leioproctus aberrans, or Leioproctus (Colletellus) aberrans, is a species of bee in the family Colletidae and subfamily Colletinae. It is endemic to Australia. It was described by entomologist Remko Leijs in 2018.

== Etymology ==
The specific epithet aberrans refers to abnormal wing venation.

== Description ==
The holotype female body length is 6.2 mm, head width 2 mm, The allotype male body length is 5.2 mm, head width 1.8 mm. Integumental colouration is mainly black with orange-brown markings.

== Distribution and habitat ==
The species occurs in South Australia. The type locality is Bon Bon Station.

== Behaviour ==
The adults are flying mellivores. Flowering plants visited by the bees include Angianthus brachypappus.

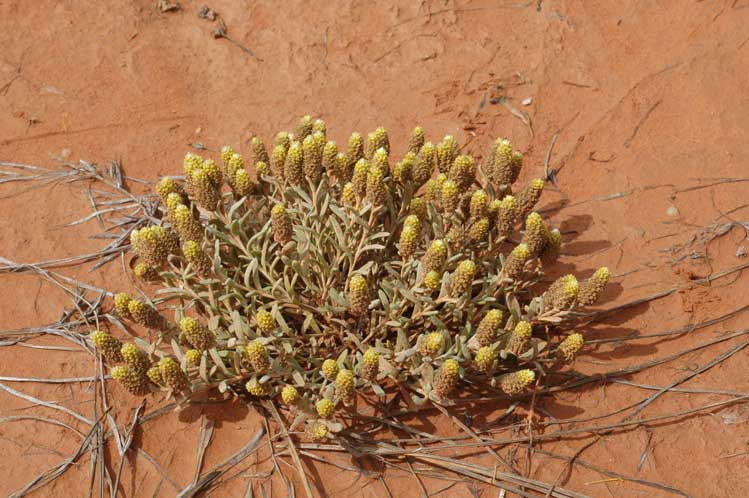
Angianthus brachypappus (spreading cup-flower), a forage plant of the bees
