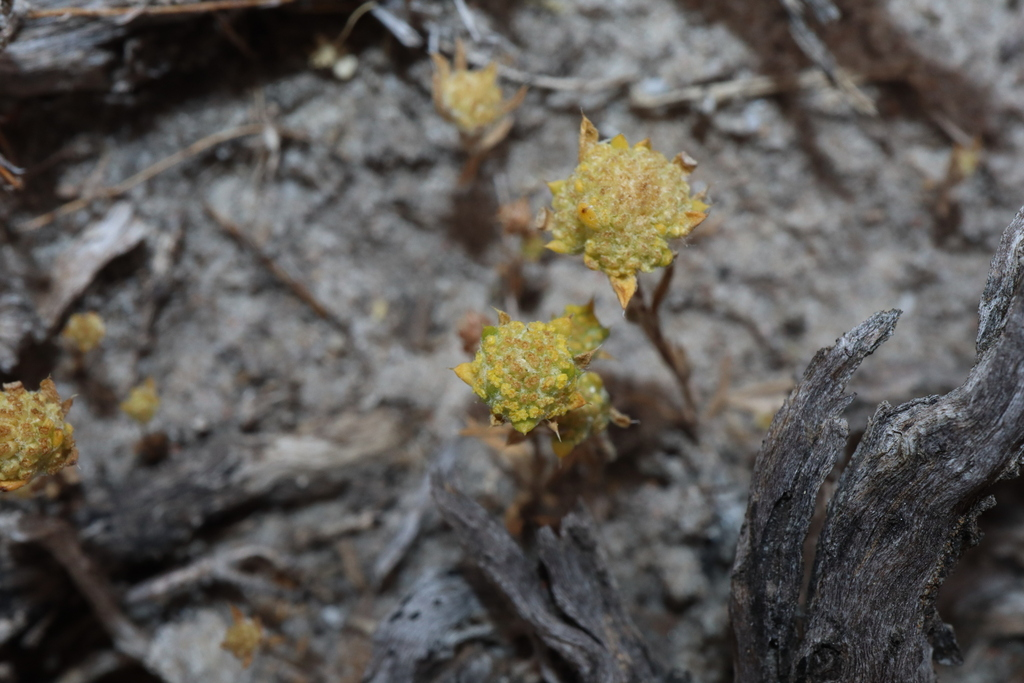
- In Lake Magenta Nature Reserve

Conservation status
- Priority Three — Poorly Known Taxa (DEC)

Scientific classification
- Kingdom: Plantae
- Clade: Tracheophytes
- Clade: Angiosperms
- Clade: Eudicots
- Clade: Asterids
- Order: Asterales
- Family: Asteraceae
- Genus: Angianthus
- Species: A. halophilus

Binomial name
- Angianthus halophilus Keighery

= Angianthus halophilus =

Species of plant

Angianthus halophilus is a species of flowering plant in the family Asteraceae, and is endemic to the south-west of Western Australia. It is an erect to spreading annual herb with soft, succulent, linear to lance-shaped leaves, oval to hemispherical compound heads of 30 to 60 yellow flowers, and egg-shaped achenes with the narrower end towards the base.

== Description ==
Angianthus halophilus is an annual herb with erect to spreading stems 15–50 mm (0.59–1.97 in) long and densely covered with cottony hairs at first, becoming sparser with age. The leaves are arranged in opposite pairs, soft and succulent, linear to lance-shaped and 0.5–1 mm (0.020–0.039 in) wide, the leaves at the base of the plant 4–7 mm (0.16–0.28 in) long and stem leaves 4–5 mm (0.16–0.20 in) wide. The flowers are yellow and borne in oval to hemispherical compound heads of 30 to 60 pseudanthia, the heads 6–8 mm (0.24–0.31 in) wide. There are four concave bracts about 2 mm (0.079 in) long at the base of the pseudanthia. Flowering occurs in October and November, and the achenes are more or less egg-shaped with the narrower end towards the base, about 0.8 mm (0.031 in) long and 0.3 mm (0.012 in) wide but without a pappus.

== Taxonomy ==
Angianthus halophilus was first formally described in 2004 by Gregory Keighery in the journal Nuytsia from specimens collected on the western edge of Lake King in 1983. The specific epithet (halophilus) means 'salt loving', "a reference to the saline gypsum dunes where this species occurs".

== Distribution and habitat ==
This species of Angianthus occurs on low, gypsum-rich dunes in saline lakes in shrubland in Lake Cairlocup, Lake Grace and Lake King in the Mallee bioregion in the south-west of Western Australia.

== Conservation status ==
Angianthus halophilus is listed as "Priority Three" by the Government of Western Australia, Department of Biodiversity, Conservation and Attractions, meaning that it is poorly known and known from only a few locations but is not under imminent threat.
