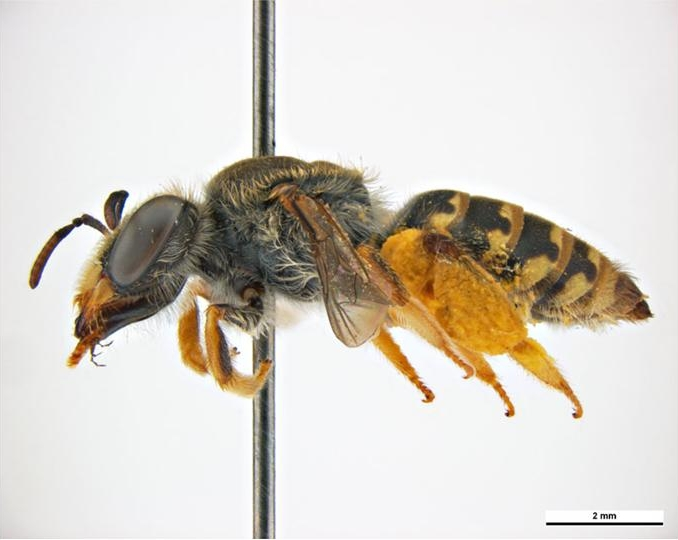

Conservation status
- Critically endangered (EPBC Act)

Scientific classification
- Kingdom: Animalia
- Phylum: Arthropoda
- Clade: Pancrustacea
- Class: Insecta
- Order: Hymenoptera
- Family: Colletidae
- Genus: Neopasiphae
- Species: N. simplicior

Binomial name
- Neopasiphae simplicior Michener, 1965

= Neopasiphae simplicior =

Species of bee

Neopasiphae simplicior, a native bee, is an endangered species found near Perth, Western Australia. Body is creamy yellow and brown, 7 mm long and wings up to 5 mm long. The Swan Coastal Plain has undergone agricultural and suburban development which has reduced the range and threatens the species with extinction. It has been collected at Cannington and the Forrestdale golf course. The species has been found on Lobelia tenuior, Goodenia filiformis and Angianthus preissianus.
