= Acacia hystrix =

Scientific classification
- Kingdom: Plantae
- Clade: Tracheophytes
- Clade: Angiosperms
- Clade: Eudicots
- Clade: Rosids
- Order: Fabales
- Family: Fabaceae
- Subfamily: Caesalpinioideae
- Clade: Mimosoid clade
- Genus: Acacia
- Species: A. hystrix

Binomial name
- Acacia hystrix Maslin
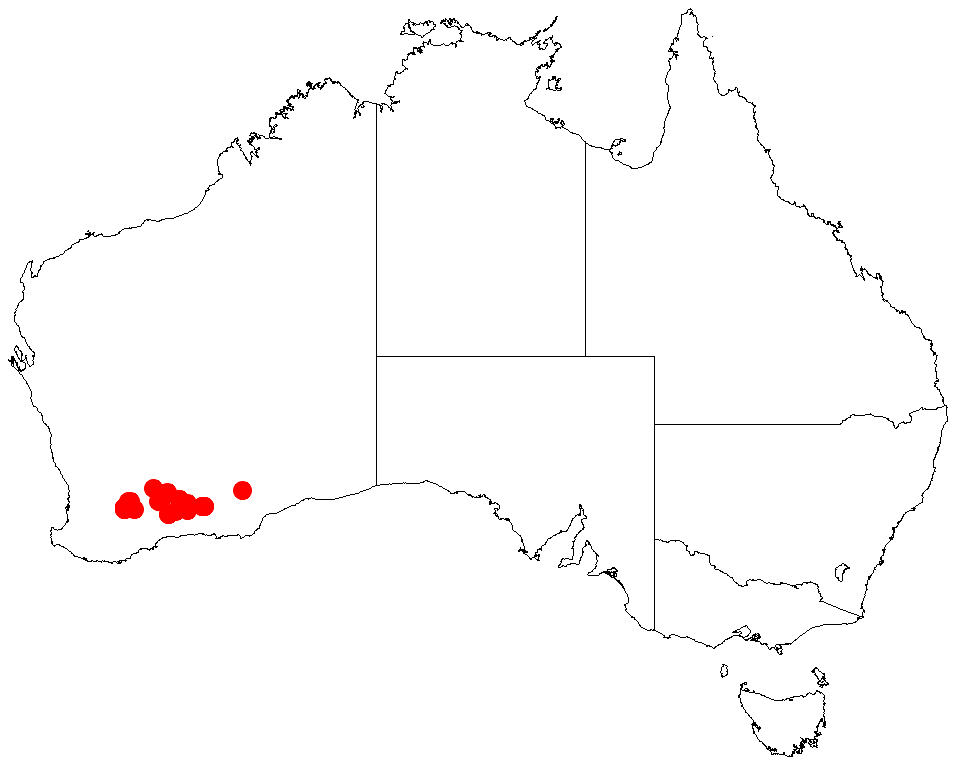
- Occurrence data from AVH

Synonyms
- Racosperma hystrix (Maslin) Pedley

Species of legume

Acacia hystrix is a species of flowering plant in the family Fabaceae and is endemic to the south-west of Western Australia. It is a rounded or inverted cone-shaped shrub with erect, sharply pointed phyllodes sometimes continuous with the branchlets, spherical heads of bright, light golden yellow flowers and oblong to narrowly oblong pods.

== Description ==
Acacia hystrix is a more or less dense, rounded or inverted cone-shaped shrub that typically grows to a height of 0.3–1.0 m (1 ft 0 in – 3 ft 3 in) and has glabrous branchlets. The phyllodes are sharply pointed, rigid, sometimes continuous with the branchlets but without forming wings, pentagonal in cross section, 20–60 mm (0.79–2.36 in) long and 1.0–1.7 mm (0.039–0.067 in) wide. The phyllodes are glabrous, more or less glaucous between five prominent yellow or yellow-green polished surfaces. There are inconspicuous stipules at the base of the phyllodes, but usually fall off.

The flowers or borne in two spherical heads in axils on a peduncle 5–15 mm (0.20–0.59 in) long, each head with 10 to 13 bright, light golden yellow flowers. Flowering period depends on subspecies, and the pods are oblong to narrowly oblong, up to 25 mm (0.98 in) long and 3–5 mm (0.12–0.20 in) wide, firmly papery to thinly leathery, curved downwards and glabrous. The seeds are oblong, 2.2–2.7 mm (0.087–0.106 in) long, somewhat glossy brown, with an aril from one half to the full length of the seed.

== Taxonomy ==
Acacia hystrix was first formally described in 1999 by Bruce Maslin in the journal Nuytsia from specimens collected by Kenneth Newbey 2.4 km (1.5 mi) north of Kulin in 1970. The specific epithet (hystrix) means 'hedgehog', referring to the rigid, erect, sharply pointed phyllodes "which are rather crowded towards the ends of the branchlets".

In the same edition of Nuytsia, Maslin described two subspecies of Acacia hystrix, and the names are accepted by the Australian Plant Census:

- Acacia hystrix subsp. continua Maslin has phyllodes that are continuous with the branchlet and mostly 30–60 mm (1.2–2.4 in) long and lack a pulvinus. Flowering has been recorded in September.
- Acacia hystrix Maslin subsp. hystrix has phyllodes with a joint at the junction with the branchlet, 20–45 mm (0.79–1.77 in) long with a yellowish orange pulvinus. Flowering has been recorded from July to October.

== Distribution and habitat ==
Acacia hystrix occurs from Kulin to near Lake Gilmore in the Coolgardie and Mallee bioregions of south-western Western Australia. Subspecies continua is only known from the type location north of Salmon Gums where it is found growing in clay loam in Eucalyptus woodland with a dense myrtaceous understory. Subspecies hystrix commonly grows in sandy loam or clay in open scrub or low open woodland.

== Conservation status ==
Acacia hystrix subsp. hystrix is listed as "not threatened", but subsp. continua is listed as "Priority One" by the Western Australian Government Department of Biodiversity, Conservation and Attractions, meaning it is known from only a few populations that are under immediate threat from known threatening processes.

== See also ==
- List of Acacia species
