= Prostanthera verticillaris =

Conservation status
- Priority One — Poorly Known Taxa (DEC)

Scientific classification
- Kingdom: Plantae
- Clade: Tracheophytes
- Clade: Angiosperms
- Clade: Eudicots
- Clade: Asterids
- Order: Lamiales
- Family: Lamiaceae
- Genus: Prostanthera
- Species: P. verticillaris

Binomial name
- Prostanthera verticillaris B.J.Conn
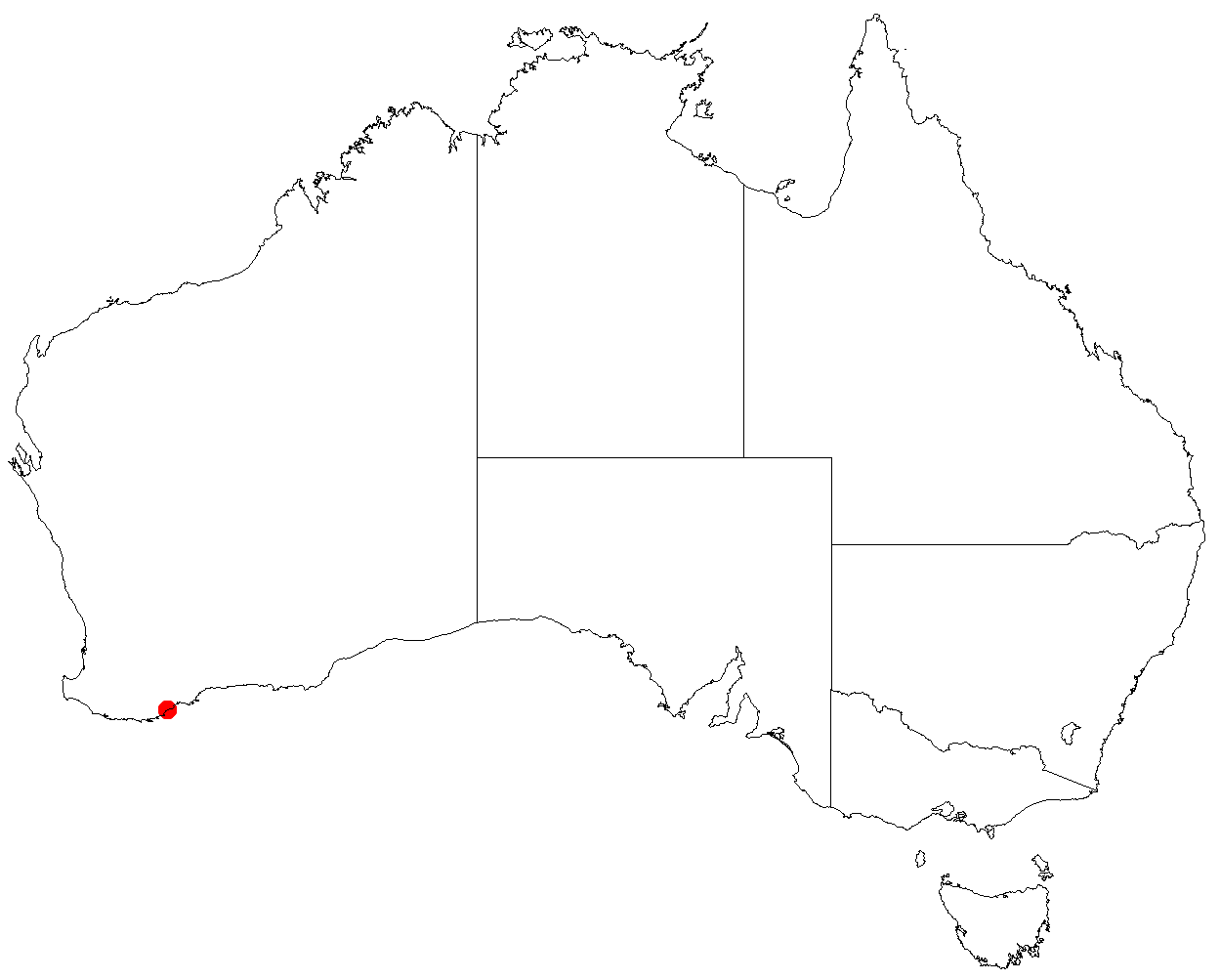
- Occurrence data from AVH

Species of flowering plant

Prostanthera verticillaris is a species of flowering plant in the family Lamiaceae and is endemic to a restricted area of Western Australia. It is a spreading shrub with whorled, egg-shaped to elliptic leaves and white to purplish-blue flowers.

== Description ==
Prostanthera verticillaris is a spreading, openly-branched shrub that typically grows to a height of 0.5–2 m (1 ft 8 in – 6 ft 7 in) and has hairy branches. The leaves are arranged in whorls of three or four, more or less glabrous, egg-shaped to elliptic, 9.5–11 mm (0.37–0.43 in) long, 4–6 mm (0.16–0.24 in) wide and sessile or on a petiole up to 1 mm (0.039 in) long. The flowers are borne on groups of six to eight near the ends of branches, each flower on a pedicel about 2 mm (0.079 in) long. The sepals form a tube about 3.5 mm (0.14 in) long with two lobes, the lower lobe about 2 mm (0.079 in) long and the upper lobe 4–4.5 mm (0.16–0.18 in) long. The petals are white to purplish-blue, 9–12 mm (0.35–0.47 in) long and form a tube with two lips, the lower centre lobe spatula-shaped, 5.3–6.8 mm (0.21–0.27 in) long and the side lobes about 2.5 mm (0.098 in) long. The upper lip is egg-shaped, about 4 mm (0.16 in) long and wide with a central notch about 1.2 mm (0.047 in) deep. Flowering occurs from September to October.

== Taxonomy ==
Prostanthera verticillaris was first formally described in 1988 by Barry Conn in the journal Nuytsia from specimens collected by Kenneth Newbey north-east of Albany in 1967.

== Distribution and habitat ==
This mintbush grows on granite outcrops and is only known from the type location in the Esperance Plains biogeographic regions of Western Australia.

== Conservation status ==
Prostanthera verticillaris is classified as "Priority One" by the Government of Western Australia Department of Parks and Wildlife, meaning that it is known from only one or a few locations which are potentially at risk.
