= Acacia cassicula =

Scientific classification
- Kingdom: Plantae
- Clade: Tracheophytes
- Clade: Angiosperms
- Clade: Eudicots
- Clade: Rosids
- Order: Fabales
- Family: Fabaceae
- Subfamily: Caesalpinioideae
- Clade: Mimosoid clade
- Genus: Acacia
- Species: A. cassicula

Binomial name
- Acacia cassicula R.S.Cowan & Maslin
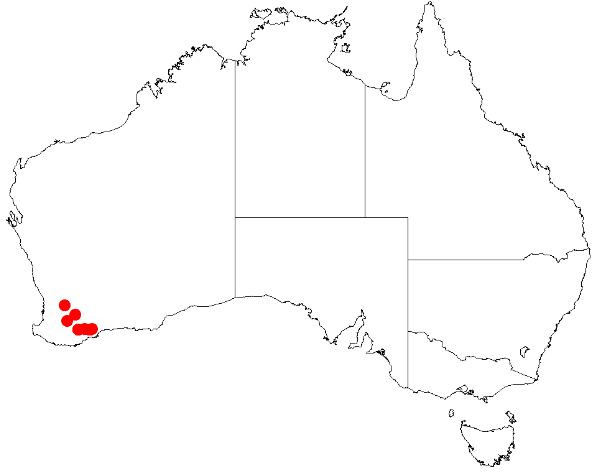
- Occurrence data from AVH

Synonyms
- Racosperma cassiculum (R.S.Cowan & Maslin) Pedley

Species of legume

Acacia cassicula is a species of flowering plant in the family Fabaceae and is endemic to an area in the south-west of Western Australia. It is a spreading shrub with oblong to egg-shaped phyllodes with the narrower end towards the base, spherical heads of yellow flowers, and linear, papery, curved or coiled, sticky pods.

== Description ==
Acacia cassicula is a spreading shrub that typically grows to a height of 1–2.5 m (3 ft 3 in – 8 ft 2 in) and has branchlets that are often sticky near the tips. The phyllodes are inclined, more or less asymmetrical, oblong to egg-shaped with the narrower end towards the base, 15–20 mm (0.59–0.79 in) long, 1.5–2.0 mm (0.059–0.079 in) wide and glabrous, with two main longitudinal veins and a gland 2–3 mm (0.079–0.118 in) above the base of the phyllodes. The flowers are borne in a spherical head in axils on a peduncle 3–5 mm (0.12–0.20 in) long with a persisting egg-shaped bract 1.5 mm (0.059 in) long on the peduncle. Each head is 4–5 mm (0.16–0.20 in) in diameter with 22 to 30 yellow flowers. Flowering occurs in August and September and the pods are linear, strongly curved or coiled, up to 70 mm (2.8 in) long, 3–4 mm (0.12–0.16 in) wide, papery and glabrous containing oblong, dark brown, glossy seeds 4–5 mm (0.16–0.20 in) long.

== Taxonomy ==
Acacia cassicula was first formally described in 1990 by Richard Cowan and Bruce Maslin from specimens collected 12.8 km (8.0 mi) east of Gnowangerup by Ken Newbey in 1964. The specific epithet (cassicula) means 'a small net' or 'a cobweb', referring to the secondary veins of the phyllodes.

== Distribution and habitat ==
This species of wattle usually grows in woodland in sandy or granitic loam, and occurs in scattered locations between Wagin and Jerramungup in the Avon Wheatbelt, Esperance Plains and Mallee bioregions of south-western Western Australia.

== Conservation status ==
Acacia cassicula is listed as "not threatened" by the Government of Western Australia Department of Biodiversity, Conservation and Attractions.

== See also ==
- List of Acacia species
