= Angianthus newbeyi =

Conservation status
- Priority Two — Poorly Known Taxa (DEC)

Scientific classification
- Kingdom: Plantae
- Clade: Tracheophytes
- Clade: Angiosperms
- Clade: Eudicots
- Clade: Asterids
- Order: Asterales
- Family: Asteraceae
- Genus: Angianthus
- Species: A. newbeyi

Binomial name
- Angianthus newbeyi Short

Species of plant

Angianthus newbeyi is a species of flowering plant in the family Asteraceae, and is endemic to a restricted area of Western Australia. It is an erect or ascending annual herb with linear, lance-shaped or narrowly oblong leaves, narrowly elliptic compound heads of 20 to 50 yellow flowers, and achenes with a jagged pappus.

== Description ==
Angianthus newbeyi is an erect or ascending annual herb that typically grows to a height of 3–5 cm (1.2–2.0 in), the stems covered with cottony hairs. The leaves are arranged alternately, linear, lance-shaped or narrowly oblong, 4–13 mm (0.16–0.51 in) long and 0.7–1 mm (0.028–0.039 in) wide. The flowers are yellow and borne in narrowly elliptic to lance-shaped compound heads of 20 to 50 pseudanthia, the heads 7–15 mm (0.28–0.59 in) long and 3–4 mm (0.12–0.16 in) wide. There are two concave bracts 2.0–2.3 mm (0.079–0.091 in) long and two egg-shaped bracts 2.1–2.2 mm (0.083–0.087 in) long with the edge curved so as to slightly cover the florets. The achenes have not been seen, the pappus a jagged ring 0.1–0.2 mm (0.0039–0.0079 in) long.

== Taxonomy ==
Angianthus newbeyi was first formally described in 1990 by Philip Sydney Short in the journal Muelleria. The specific epithet (newbeyi) commemorates Ken Newbey of Ongerup.

== Distribution and habitat ==
This species of Angianthus grows in subsaline sand on slopes into salt lakes in the Coolgardie and Mallee bioregions of inland Western Australia.

== Conservation status ==
Angianthus newbeyi is listed as "Priority Two" by the Government of Western Australia Department of Biodiversity, Conservation and Attractions, meaning that it is poorly known and from one or a few locations.
