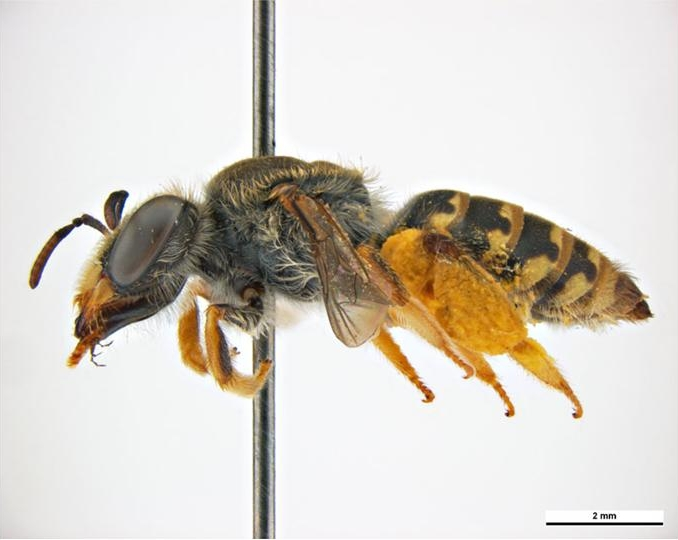
- Neopasiphae simplicior

Scientific classification
- Kingdom: Animalia
- Phylum: Arthropoda
- Clade: Pancrustacea
- Class: Insecta
- Order: Hymenoptera
- Family: Colletidae
- Tribe: Paracolletini
- Genus: Neopasiphae; Perkins, 1912

= Neopasiphae =

Genus of bees

Neopasiphae is a genus of bees belonging to the family Colletidae and the subfamily Colletinae. It was described in 1912 by British entomologist Robert Cyril Layton Perkins. It is endemic to Australia.

== Species ==
As of 2026 there were three valid species:

- Neopasiphae insignis Rayment, 1930
- Neopasiphae mirabilis Perkins, 1912
- Neopasiphae simplicior Michener, 1965
