= Acacia newbeyi =

Conservation status
- Priority Three — Poorly Known Taxa (DEC)

Scientific classification
- Kingdom: Plantae
- Clade: Tracheophytes
- Clade: Angiosperms
- Clade: Eudicots
- Clade: Rosids
- Order: Fabales
- Family: Fabaceae
- Subfamily: Caesalpinioideae
- Clade: Mimosoid clade
- Genus: Acacia
- Species: A. newbeyi

Binomial name
- Acacia newbeyi Maslin
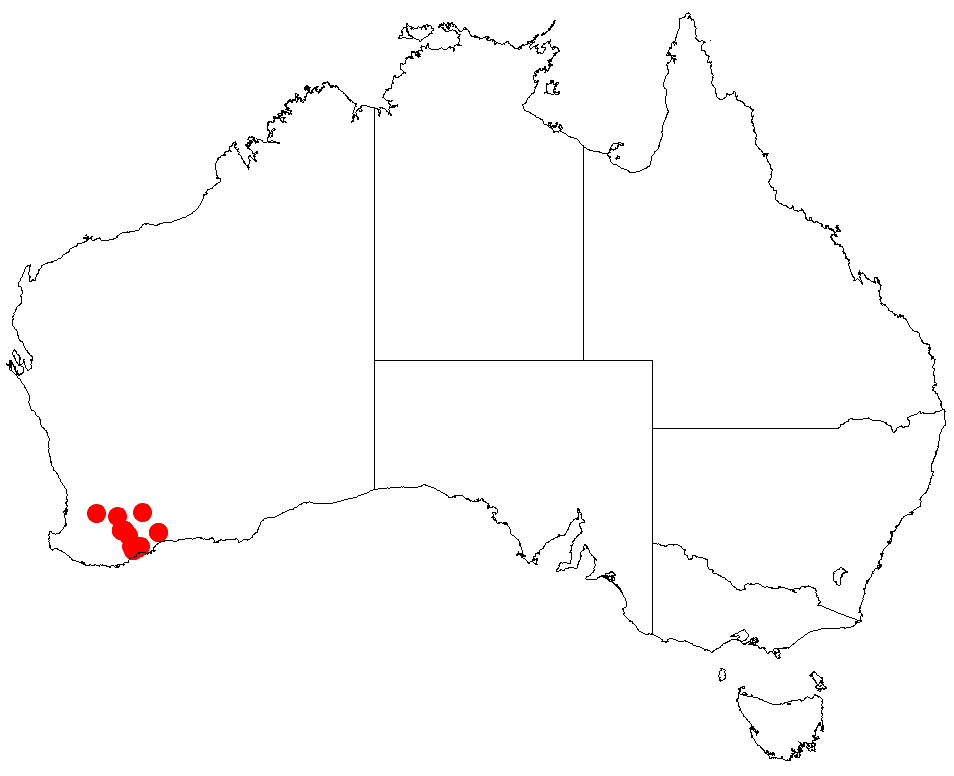
- Occurrence data from AVH

Synonyms
- Racosperma newbeyi (Maslin) Pedley

Species of legume

Acacia newbeyi is a species of flowering plant in the family Fabaceae, and is endemic to the south-west of Western Australia. It is a shrub with sharply pointed, hairy branchlets, bipinnate leaves, spherical heads of pale yellow flowers and very thinly leathery pods.

== Description ==
Acacia newbeyi openly branched shrub that typically grows to a height of 0.3–1 m (1 ft 0 in – 3 ft 3 in) and has sharply pointed branchlets with fine, soft hairs pressed against the surface. Its leaves are more or less glabrous and bipinnate with one pair of pinnae 1.5–2.5 mm (0.059–0.098 in) long on a petiole up to 0.5 mm (0.020 in) long, each pinna with mostly two oblong to egg-shaped, green to subglaucous pinnules 2–5 mm (0.079–0.197 in) long and 1–2 mm (0.039–0.079 in) wide. The flowers are borne in a spherical head in axils on glabrous peduncles 4–10 mm (0.16–0.39 in) long, each head with 10 to 13 pale yellow flowers. Flowering occurs from July to August, and the pods are 20–30 mm (0.79–1.18 in) long, 3–4 mm (0.12–0.16 in) wide and very thinly leathery. The seeds are oblong to elliptic, 2.0–2.5 mm (0.079–0.098 in) long and glossy.

== Taxonomy ==
Acacia newbeyi was first formally described in 1975 by Bruce Maslin in the journal Nuytsia from specimens he collected 1.5 mi (2.4 km) north of Nyabing in 1973. The specific epithet (newbeyi) honours Kenneth Newbey, "who, for many reasons has made valuable collections of Western Australian plants, particularly from the Ongerup area".

== Distribution and habitat ==
This species of wattle grows in gravelly lateritic soils in tall or open shrubland near Nyabing, Boxwood Hill and west of Ravensthorpe in the Avon Wheatbelt, Esperance Plains and Mallee bioregions in the south-west of Western Australia.

== Conservation status ==
Acacia newbeyi is listed as 'Priority Three' by the Government of Western Australia Department of Biodiversity, Conservation and Attractions, meaning that it is poorly known and known from only a few locations but is not under imminent threat.

== See also ==
- List of Acacia species
