= Angianthus globuliformis =

Conservation status
- Priority One — Poorly Known Taxa (DEC)

Scientific classification
- Kingdom: Plantae
- Clade: Tracheophytes
- Clade: Angiosperms
- Clade: Eudicots
- Clade: Asterids
- Order: Asterales
- Family: Asteraceae
- Genus: Angianthus
- Species: A. globuliformis

Binomial name
- Angianthus globuliformis M.Lyons & Keighery

Species of plant

Angianthus globuliformis is a species of flowering plant in the family Asteraceae, and is endemic to a small area of Western Australia. It is a prostrate to low-lying annual herb with soft, succulent, linear to lance-shaped leaves, oval compound heads of 15 to 30 yellow flowers, and egg-shaped achenes with the narrower end towards the base.

== Description ==
Angianthus globuliformis is an annual herb with prostrate to low-lying stems 15–50 mm (0.59–1.97 in) long and glabrous or sparingly hairy. The leaves are arranged in opposite pairs, linear to lance-shaped and about 1 mm (0.039 in) wide, the leaves at the base of the plant 4–7 mm (0.16–0.28 in) long and stem leaves 4–5 mm (0.16–0.20 in) wide. The flowers are yellow and borne in egg-shaped compound heads of 15 to 30 pseudanthia, the heads 3–5 mm (0.12–0.20 in) long and wide. There are four concave bracts about 2 mm (0.079 in) long at the base of the pseudanthia. Flowering occurs in October and November, and the achenes are egg-shaped with the narrower end towards the base, about 0.8 mm (0.031 in) long and 0.3 mm (0.012 in) wide but without a pappus.

== Taxonomy ==
Angianthus globuliformis was first formally described in 2015 by Mike Lyons and Gregory Keighery in the journal Nuytsia. The specific epithet (globuliformis) means 'button-like', referring to the flower heads that resemble a collections of buttons on the soil surface.

== Distribution and habitat ==
This species of Angianthus is only known from the type collection on the edge of a small salt lake in low, gypsum-rich dunes near Lake Altham in the Mallee bioregion in south-western Western Australia.

== Conservation status ==
Angianthus globuliformis is listed as "Priority One" by the Government of Western Australia Department of Biodiversity, Conservation and Attractions, meaning that it is known from only one or a few locations that are potentially at risk.
