= Angianthus cornutus =

Scientific classification
- Kingdom: Plantae
- Clade: Tracheophytes
- Clade: Angiosperms
- Clade: Eudicots
- Clade: Asterids
- Order: Asterales
- Family: Asteraceae
- Genus: Angianthus
- Species: A. cornutus

Binomial name
- Angianthus cornutus Short

Synonyms
- Angianthus milnei auct. non Benth.

Species of plant

Angianthus cornutus is a species of flowering plant in the family Asteraceae, and is endemic to Western Australia. It is a low-lying or ascending annual herb with hairy linear leaves, more or less oval compound heads of yellow flowers, and egg-shaped or oval achenes.

== Description ==
Angianthus cornutus is an ascending or low-lying annual herb that typically grows to a height of 3–10 cm (1.2–3.9 in), the stems not distinct from the major branches. The leaves are hairy, usually linear, 6–12 mm (0.24–0.47 in) long and about 1 mm (0.039 in) wide. The flowers are yellow and borne in egg-shaped compound heads of 30 to 40 pseudanthia, the heads 8–12 mm (0.31–0.47 in) long and 3–6 mm (0.12–0.24 in) wide. There are two concave bracts 2.4–2.6 mm (0.094–0.102 in) long and two flat bracts 2.4–3.0 mm (0.094–0.118 in) long with two distinct, horn-like appendages. Flowering occurs from August to October, and the achenes are more or less elliptic, 0.6 mm (0.024 in) long and about 0.3 mm (0.012 in) wide.

== Taxonomy ==
Angianthus cornutus was first formally described in 1983 by Philip Sydney Short in the journal Muelleria. The specific epithet (cornutus) means 'horned' referring to appendages on the bracts.

== Distribution and habitat ==
This species of Angianthus is recorded as growing on "a low rocky ridge in ironstone wash area" in the Coolgardie, Gascoyne, Great Victoria Desert, Murchison and Yalgoo bioregions of Western Australia.

== Conservation status ==
Angianthus cornutus is listed as "not threatened" by the Government of Western Australia Department of Biodiversity, Conservation and Attractions.
