= Angianthus uniflorus =

Conservation status
- Priority One — Poorly Known Taxa (DEC)

Scientific classification
- Kingdom: Plantae
- Clade: Tracheophytes
- Clade: Angiosperms
- Clade: Eudicots
- Clade: Asterids
- Order: Asterales
- Family: Asteraceae
- Genus: Angianthus
- Species: A. uniflorus

Binomial name
- Angianthus uniflorus Short

Species of plant

Angianthus uniflorus is a species of flowering plant in the family Asteraceae, and is endemic to a restricted area of inland Western Australia. It is an erect or ascending annual herb with cottony hairs, linear or lance-shaped leaves and oval to widely oval or elliptic compound heads of 30 to 60 yellow flowers.

== Description ==
Angianthus uniflorus is an erect or ascending annual herb with cottony hairy stems up to about 70 cm (28 in) long. The leaves are arranged alternately, linear or lance-shaped, sometimes with the narrower end towards the base, 5–10.5 mm (0.20–0.41 in) long and 0.5–1.5 mm (0.020–0.059 in) wide. The flowers are yellow and borne in oval to very broadly oval or elliptic compound heads of 30 to 60 pseudanthia, the heads 6–10 mm (0.24–0.39 in) long and 5–7 mm (0.20–0.28 in) wide. There are bracts forming an involucre about one-third the length of the head.

== Taxonomy ==
Angianthus uniflorus was first formally described in 1990 by Philip Sydney Short in the journal Muelleria from specimens collected by Paul Graham Wilson about 15 km (9.3 mi) south of Cue in 1986. The specific epithet (uniflorus) "reflects the fact that this is one of only two species of Angianthus with single-flowered capitula".

== Distribution and habitat ==
This species of Angianthus has been observed growing on the margin of a calcrete rise near a gypseous salt lake. It is only known from the type locality near Cue in the Murchison bioregion of Western Australia.

== Conservation status ==
Angianthus uniflorus is listed as "Priority One" by the Government of Western Australia Department of Biodiversity, Conservation and Attractions, meaning that it is known from only one or a few locations that are potentially at risk.
