= Angianthus phyllocalymmeus =

Scientific classification
- Kingdom: Plantae
- Clade: Embryophytes
- Clade: Tracheophytes
- Clade: Angiosperms
- Clade: Eudicots
- Clade: Asterids
- Order: Asterales
- Family: Asteraceae
- Genus: Angianthus
- Species: A. phyllocalymmeus

Binomial name
- Angianthus phyllocalymmeus (F.Muell.) Druce

Synonyms
- Angianthus phyllocalymmeus Domin isonym; Angianthus phyllocalymneus Domin orth. var.; Angianthus pleuropappus Benth. nom. illeg.; Pleuropappus phyllocalymmeus F.Muell.; Pleuropappus phyllocalymnus Anderb. orth. var.; Styloncerus phyllocalymmeus (F.Muell.) Kuntze; Styloncerus phyllocalymneus Kuntze orth. var.

Species of flowering plant

Angianthus phyllocalymmeus, commonly known as saltlake candle-daisy, is a species of flowering plant in the family Asteraceae, and is endemic to the south of South Australia. It is an erect annual herb with linear leaves, compound heads of 40 to 100 yellow flowers, and elliptic achenes with a jagged pappus.

== Description ==
Angianthus phyllocalymmeus is an erect, branched, annual herb that typically grows to a height of 4–8 cm (1.6–3.1 in). The leaves are arranged alternately, linear, 7–13 mm (0.28–0.51 in) long and about 1 mm (0.039 in) wide. The flowers are golden yellow and borne in compound heads of 50 to 100 pseudanthia, the heads 8–15 mm (0.31–0.59 in) long and 3–5 mm (0.12–0.20 in) wide. There are about ten narrowly elliptic or lance-shaped bracts 4–10 mm (0.16–0.39 in) long and 1.0–1.5 mm (0.039–0.059 in) long at the base of the compound heads, and two bracts 2.0–2.3 mm (0.079–0.091 in) long at the base of the pseudanthia with the edge curved so as to slightly cover the florets. The achenes are elliptic, 0.7–0.8 mm (0.028–0.031 in) long and about 0.5 mm (0.020 in) in diameter, and the pappus is a jagged scale.

== Taxonomy ==
This species was first formally described in 1855 by Ferdinand von Mueller who gave it the name Pleuropappus phyllocalymmeus in the Transactions and Proceedings of the Victorian Institute for the Advancement of Science, from specimens collected by Carl Wilhelmi "on sterile plains" near Port Lincoln in South Australia. In 1917, George Druce transferred the species to Angianthus as A. phyllocalymmeus.

== Distribution and habitat ==
Angianthus phyllocalymmeus grows exclusively in sandy or clay loam on the edges of saline depressions, associated with Halosarcia in the Eyre Yorke Block of southern South Australia.

== Conservation status ==
Angianthus phyllocalymmeus is listed as "vulnerable" by the IUCN.
