= Angianthus pygmaeus =

Scientific classification
- Kingdom: Plantae
- Clade: Tracheophytes
- Clade: Angiosperms
- Clade: Eudicots
- Clade: Asterids
- Order: Asterales
- Family: Asteraceae
- Genus: Angianthus
- Species: A. pygmaeus

Binomial name
- Angianthus pygmaeus (Gray) Benth.

Species of plant

Angianthus pygmaeus, commonly known as pygmy angianthus, is a species of flowering plant in the family Asteraceae, and is endemic to the south-west of Western Australia. It is a prostrate annual herb with narrowly elliptic or more or less linear leaves, yellow flowers, and broadly top-shaped achenes lacking a pappus.

== Description ==
Angianthus pygmaeus is a prostrate annual herb with hairy stems 5–60 cm (2.0–23.6 in) long. The leaves are narrowly elliptic or more or less linear 3–10 mm (0.12–0.39 in) long and about 1 mm (0.039 in) wide. The flowers are yellow and borne in very broadly oval compound heads of 15 to 50 pseudanthia, the heads 2–4 mm (0.079–0.157 in) long and 2–6 mm (0.079–0.236 in) wide. There are about 5 to 10 bracts forming an involucre at the base of the heads, the outer ones leaf-like, two concave bracts 1.6–2.2 mm (0.063–0.087 in) long and two flat bracts 1.6–2.2 mm (0.063–0.087 in) long at the base of the pseudanthia. Flowering occurs from October to December and the achenes are oval, 0.5–0.7 mm (0.020–0.028 in) long and 0.2–0.3 mm (0.0079–0.0118 in) in diameter and there is no pappus.

== Taxonomy ==
This species was first formally described in 1851 by Asa Gray who gave it the name Skirrhophorus pygmaeus in Hooker's Journal of Botany and Kew Garden Miscellany from specimens collected by James Drummmond. In 1867, George Bentham transferred the species to Angianthus as A. pygmaeus in his Flora Australiensis. The specific epithet (pygmaeus) means 'dwarf'.

== Distribution and habitat ==
Pygmy angianthus grows in saline depressions and flats in sandy clay or loam in the salt lakes of the Avon River, in the Avon Wheatbelt and Esperance Plains and Mallee bioregions of south-western Western Australia.

== Conservation status ==
Angianthus prostratus is listed as "not threatened" by the Government of Western Australia, Department of Biodiversity, Conservation and Attractions.
