= Angianthus prostratus =

Conservation status
- Priority Three — Poorly Known Taxa (DEC)

Scientific classification
- Kingdom: Plantae
- Clade: Tracheophytes
- Clade: Angiosperms
- Clade: Eudicots
- Clade: Asterids
- Order: Asterales
- Family: Asteraceae
- Genus: Angianthus
- Species: A. prostratus

Binomial name
- Angianthus prostratus P.S.Short

Species of plant

Angianthus prostratus is a species of flowering plant in the family Asteraceae, and is endemic to inland areas of Western Australia. It is a prostrate or low-lying annual herb with linear or lance-shaped leaves, very broadly oval compound heads of 20 to 30 yellow flowers, and oval achenes lacking a pappus.

== Description ==
Angianthus prostratus is a prostrate or low-lying annual herb with hairy stems 5–20 cm (2.0–7.9 in) long. The leaves are arranged alternately, linear or lance-shaped with the narrower end towards the base, 5–10 mm (0.20–0.39 in) long and 0.5–1 mm (0.020–0.039 in) wide. The flowers are yellow and borne in very broadly oval compound heads of 20 to 30 pseudanthia, the heads 5–10 mm (0.20–0.39 in) long and 5–11 mm (0.20–0.43 in) wide. There are about 10 bracts forming an involucre at the base of the heads, the outer ones leaf-like, and two concave bracts 2.6–3.2 mm (0.10–0.13 in) long and two flat bracts 2.3–3.0 mm (0.091–0.118 in) long at the base of the pseudanthia. Flowering occurs from July to September and the achenes are oval, 0.7–0.9 mm (0.028–0.035 in) long and 0.5 mm (0.020 in) in diameter and there is no pappus.

== Taxonomy ==
Angianthus prostratus was first formally described in 1983 by Philip Sydney Short in the journal Muelleria from specimens collected 10 mi (16 km) south of Leonora on the road to Menzies. The specific epithet (prostratus) "alludes to the common habit of the species".

== Distribution and habitat ==
This species of Angianthus grows in saline soils near salt lakes, and in loamy soils in Eucalyptus woodland in the Avon Wheatbelt and Murchison bioregions of inland Western Australia.

== Conservation status ==
Angianthus prostratus is listed as "Priority Three" by the Government of Western Australia, Department of Biodiversity, Conservation and Attractions, meaning that it is poorly known and known from only a few locations but is not under imminent threat.
