= Lake Cairlocup =

Lake in Western Australia

- Location in Western Australia
- Interactive map of Lake Cairlocup
- Location: Western Australia
- Coordinates: 33°43′33″S 118°44′41″E
- Type: Salt lake
- Catchment area: 4,000 ha (9,900 acres)
- Basin countries: Australia
- Surface area: 340 ha (840 acres)

Lake Cairlocup is an ephemeral salt lake in the Great Southern region of Western Australia, approximately 42 km (26 mi) north-west of Jerramungup and 95 km (59 mi) south-east of Lake Grace.

Fringing vegetation around the lake includes Hakea brachyptera, Lechenaultia acutiloba, Angianthus halophilus, and Goodenia salina.

== See also ==
- List of lakes of Australia § Western Australia
