= Leucopogon newbeyi =

Conservation status
- Priority Three — Poorly Known Taxa (DEC)

Scientific classification
- Kingdom: Plantae
- Clade: Tracheophytes
- Clade: Angiosperms
- Clade: Eudicots
- Clade: Asterids
- Order: Ericales
- Family: Ericaceae
- Genus: Leucopogon
- Species: L. newbeyi

Binomial name
- Leucopogon newbeyi Hislop
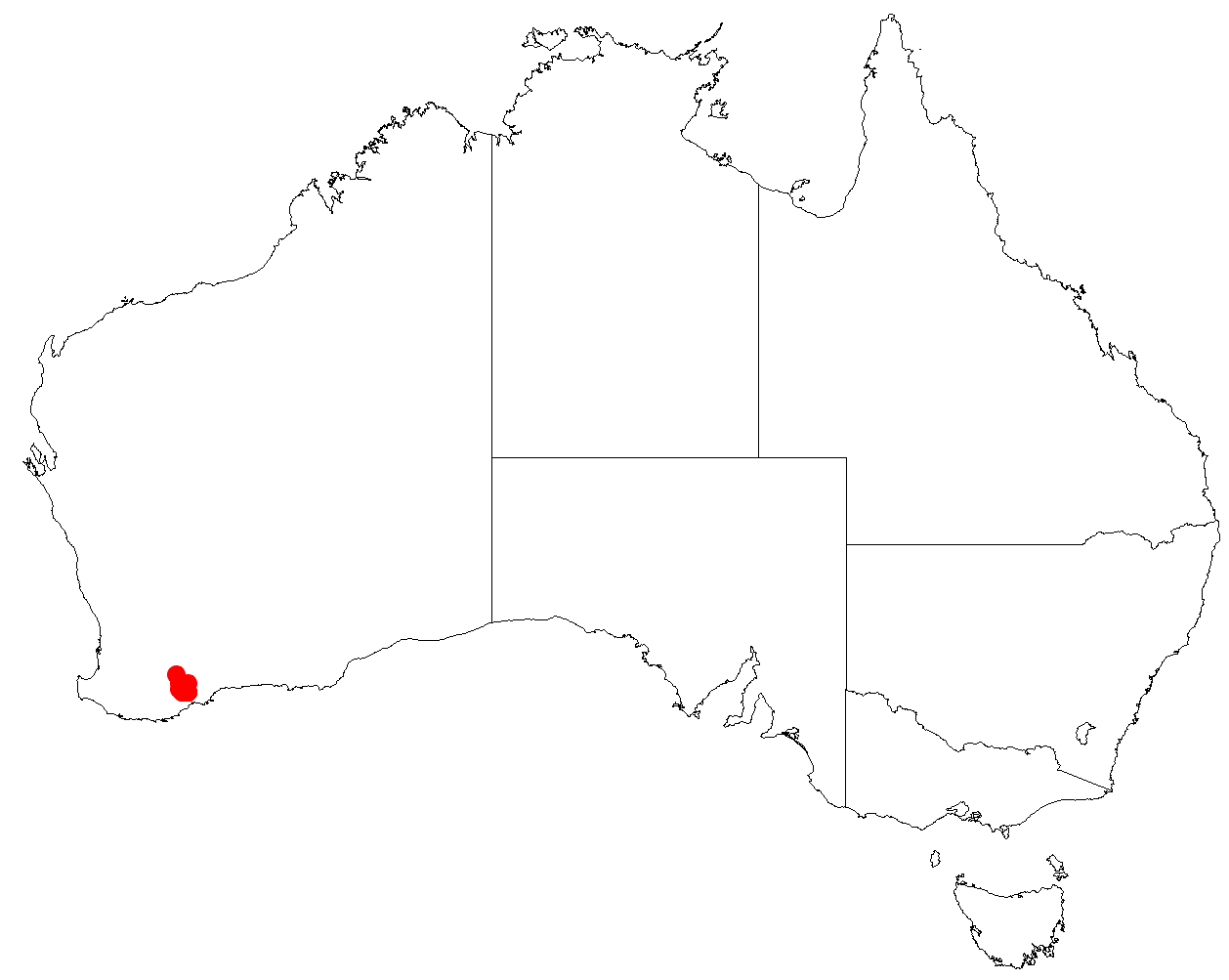
- Occurrence data from AVH

Species of plant

Leucopogon newbeyi is a species of flowering plant in the heath family Ericaceae and is endemic to a small area in the southwest of Western Australia. It is an erect shrub with densely hairy young branchlets, linear to narrowly elliptic or narrowly egg-shaped leaves and erect, compact clusters of 7 to 17 white, bell-shaped flowers mainly on the ends of branches.

== Description ==
Leucopogon newbeyi is an erect shrub that typically grows up to about 90 cm (35 in) high and 70 cm (28 in) wide, its young branchlets densely covered with straight or curved hairs. The leaves are spirally arranged, linear to narrowly elliptic or narrowly egg-shaped, 3.2–8.4 mm (0.13–0.33 in) long and 0.8–1.5 mm (0.031–0.059 in) wide on a yellowish petiole 0.3–0.6 mm (0.012–0.024 in) long. The edges of the leaves are usually turned down or rolled under, the upper surface glabrous and lower surface hairy but sometimes concealed. The flowers are arranged in groups of 7 to 17, mainly on the ends of branchlets, with egg-shaped bracts 1.3–1.9 mm (0.051–0.075 in) long, and egg-shaped bracteoles 1.6–2.5 mm (0.063–0.098 in) long. The sepals are egg-shaped or narrowly egg-shaped and 2.0–3.1 mm (0.079–0.122 in) long. The petals are white and joined at the base to form a bell-shaped or broadly bell-shaped tube 1.1–1.8 mm (0.043–0.071 in) long, the lobes widely spreading and curved backwards, 1.7–2.5 mm (0.067–0.098 in) long and densely bearded. Flowering mainly occurs in July and August and the fruit is an elliptic or oval drupe 2.0–2.4 mm (0.079–0.094 in) long.

== Taxonomy and naming ==
Leucopogon newbeyi was first formally described in 2012 by Michael Clyde Hislop in the journal Nuytsia from specimens he collected near Ongerup in 2011. The specific epithet (newbeyi) honours Kenneth Newbey.

== Distribution and habitat ==
This leucopogon grows in the understorey of mallee woodland and occurs in a narrow band from near Nyabing to south of Ongerup in the Mallee bioregion of south-western Western Australia.

== Conservation status ==
Leucopogon newbeyi is listed as "Priority Three" by the Government of Western Australia Department of Biodiversity, Conservation and Attractions, meaning that it is poorly known and known from only a few locations but is not under imminent threat.
