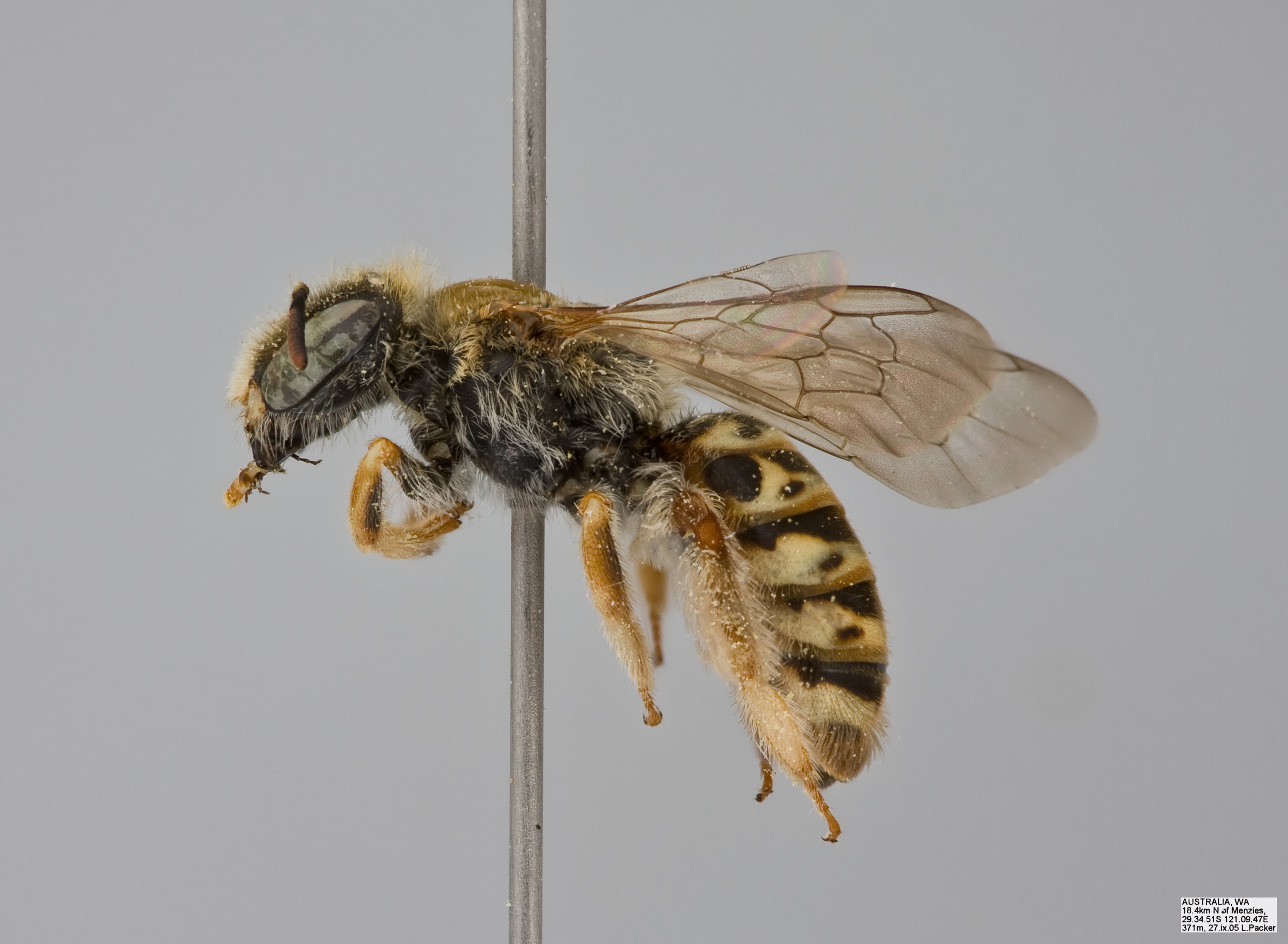
- Female

Scientific classification
- Kingdom: Animalia
- Phylum: Arthropoda
- Clade: Pancrustacea
- Class: Insecta
- Order: Hymenoptera
- Family: Colletidae
- Genus: Neopasiphae
- Species: N. mirabilis

Binomial name
- Neopasiphae mirabilis Perkins, 1912

= Neopasiphae mirabilis =

Species of bee

Neopasiphae mirabilis is a species of bee in the family Colletidae and the subfamily Colletinae. It is endemic to Australia. It was described in 1912 by English entomologist Robert Cyril Layton Perkins.

== Description ==
The body length of the male is 10 mm. Colouration is mainly black and yellow.

== Distribution and habitat ==
The species occurs in Western Australia. The type locality is the Violet Range, near Yakabindie, in the arid inland of the Goldfields–Esperance region.

== Behaviour ==
The adults are flying mellivores.

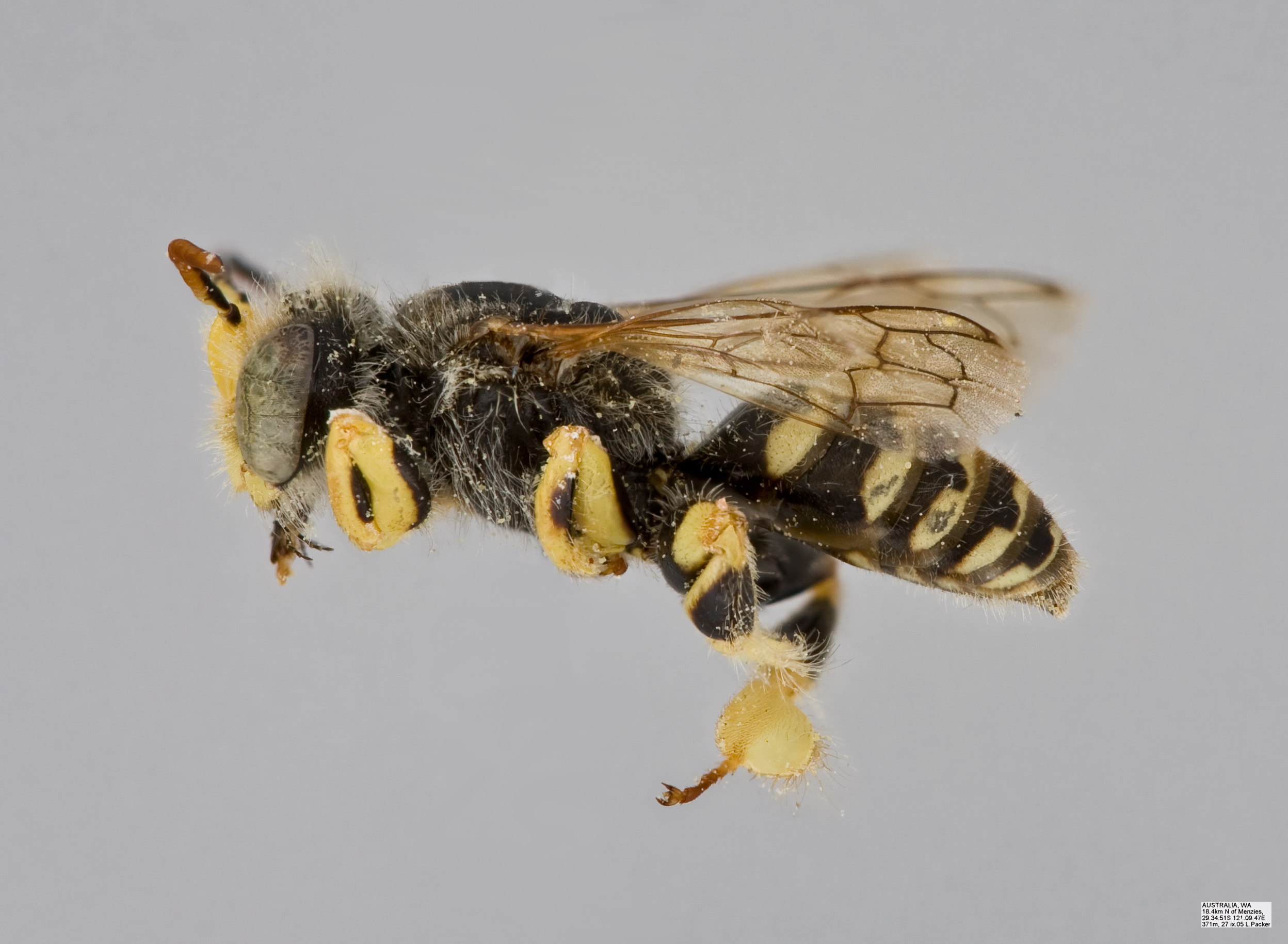
Male
