= Angianthus glabratus =

Scientific classification
- Kingdom: Plantae
- Clade: Tracheophytes
- Clade: Angiosperms
- Clade: Eudicots
- Clade: Asterids
- Order: Asterales
- Family: Asteraceae
- Genus: Angianthus
- Species: A. glabratus

Binomial name
- Angianthus glabratus Short

Species of plant

Angianthus glabratus, commonly known as smooth cup-flower, is a species of flowering plant in the family Asteraceae, and is endemic to South Australia. It is an erect or ascending annual herb with glabrous, succulent, cylindrical leaves, narrowly elliptic to elliptic compound heads of 100 to 500 yellow flowers, and oval achenes with a cup-shaped pappus.

== Description ==
Angianthus glabratus is an erect or ascending annual herb that typically grows to a height of 6–14 cm (2.4–5.5 in), the stems glabrous or slightly hairy. The leaves are glabrous, succulent and cylindrical, 4–16 mm (0.16–0.63 in) long and about 1 mm (0.039 in) wide. The flowers are yellow and borne in narrowly elliptic to elliptic compound heads of 100 to 500 pseudanthia, the heads 10–25 mm (0.39–0.98 in) long and 4–6 mm (0.16–0.24 in) wide. There are two concave bracts 1.6–2.3 mm (0.063–0.091 in) long and two flat, elliptic or egg-shaped bracts 1.6–2.2 mm (0.063–0.087 in) long. The achenes are oval, 0.5–0.8 mm (0.020–0.031 in) long and about 0.3 mm (0.012 in) wide with a cup-shaped pappus 0.2–0.4 mm (0.0079–0.0157 in) high.

== Taxonomy ==
Angianthus glabratus was first formally described in 1983 by Philip Sydney Short in the journal Muelleria. The specific epithet (glabratus) means 'nearly glabrous'.

== Distribution and habitat ==
This species of Angianthus grows in sandy or clay soils near saline depressions in the Gawler and Great Victoria desert bioregions of South Australia.
