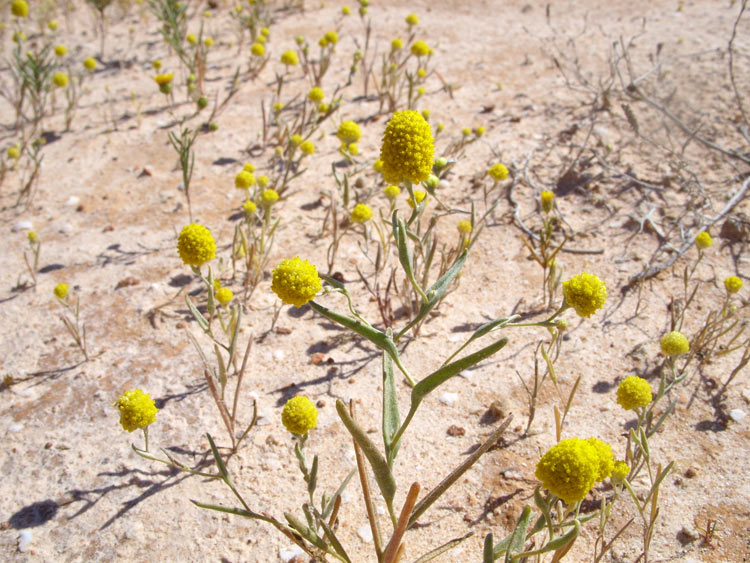
- Near Denham

Scientific classification
- Kingdom: Plantae
- Clade: Embryophytes
- Clade: Tracheophytes
- Clade: Angiosperms
- Clade: Eudicots
- Clade: Asterids
- Order: Asterales
- Family: Asteraceae
- Genus: Angianthus
- Species: A. acrohyalinus

Binomial name
- Angianthus acrohyalinus Morrison

= Angianthus acrohyalinus =

Species of flowering plant

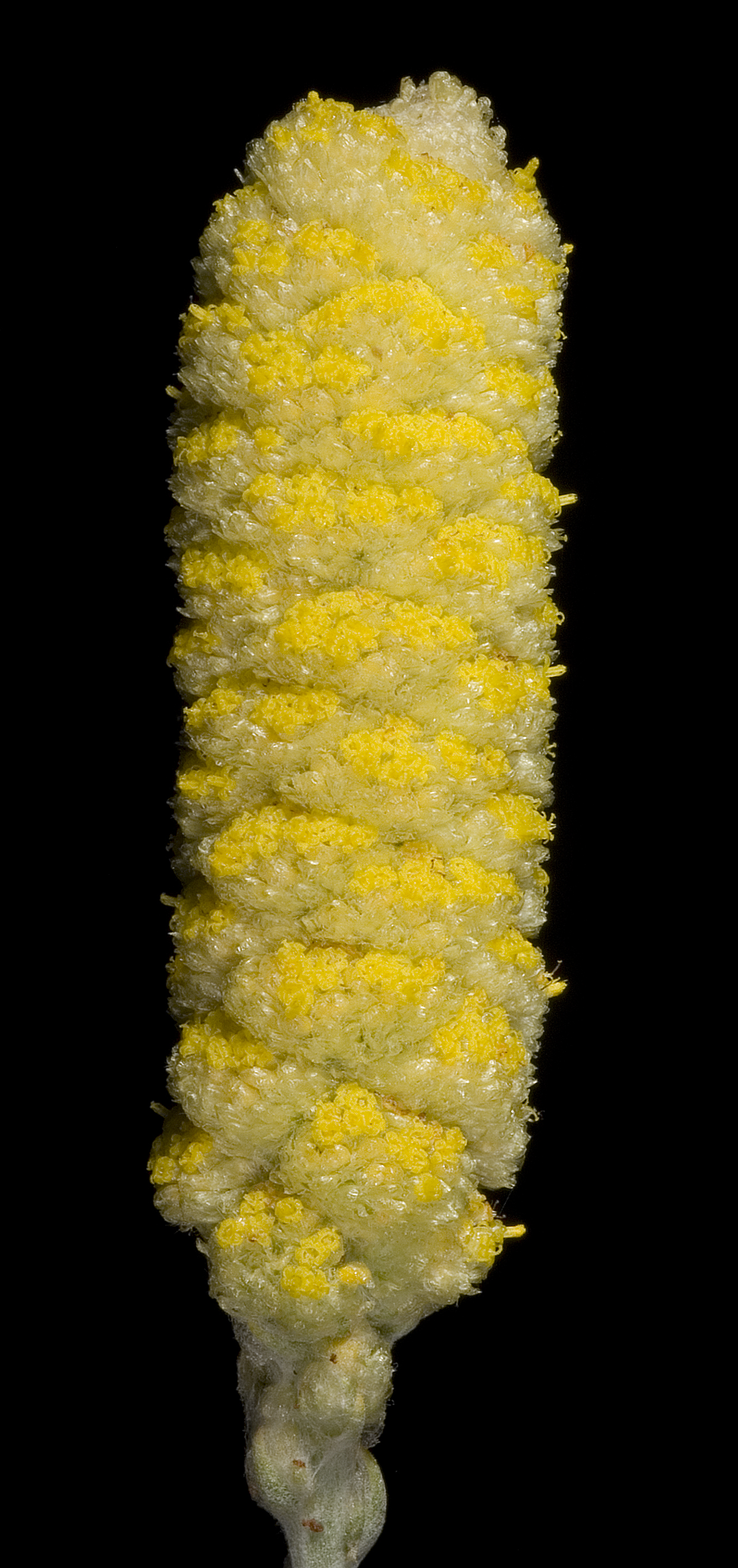
Flower detail

Angianthus acrohyalinus, commonly known as hook-leaf angianthus, is a species of flowering plant in the family Asteraceae, and is endemic to Western Australia. It is an erect, hairy annual herb with hairy lance-shaped leaves, elliptic or oval compound heads of yellow flowers, and egg-shaped or oval achenes with a bristly pappus.

== Description ==
Angianthus acrohyalinus is an erect, hairy annual herb that typically grows to a height of 10–30 cm (3.9–11.8 in), often forming branches at the base and/or near the top of larger plants. The leaves are hairy, lance-shaped, often turned down at the tip, mostly 10–60 mm (0.39–2.36 in) long and 3–6 mm (0.12–0.24 in) wide. The flowers are borne in elliptic or oval compound heads of 300–1000 pseudanthia, the heads 8–25 mm (0.31–0.98 in) long and 7–11 mm (0.28–0.43 in) wide. Flowering occurs from August to October, and the achenes are egg-shaped or oval, 0.45–0.85 mm (0.018–0.033 in) long and about 0.2 mm (0.0079 in) wide, the pappus with 4 to 6 bristles.

== Taxonomy ==
Angianthus acrohyalinus was first formally described in 1912 by Alexander Morrison in the Journal of Botany, British and Foreign from specimens collected near the Ashburton River. The specific epithet (acrohyalinus) means 'thin and translucent at the end', alluding to the terminal bracts.

== Distribution and habitat ==
This species of Angianthus grows in clay, loam or red sand on dunes, stony flats with Tecticornia species, and coastal plains in the Carnarvon, Gascoyne and Pilbara bioregions of northern Western Australia.

== Conservation status ==
Angianthus acrohyalinus is listed as "not threatened" by the Government of Western Australia Department of Biodiversity, Conservation and Attractions.
