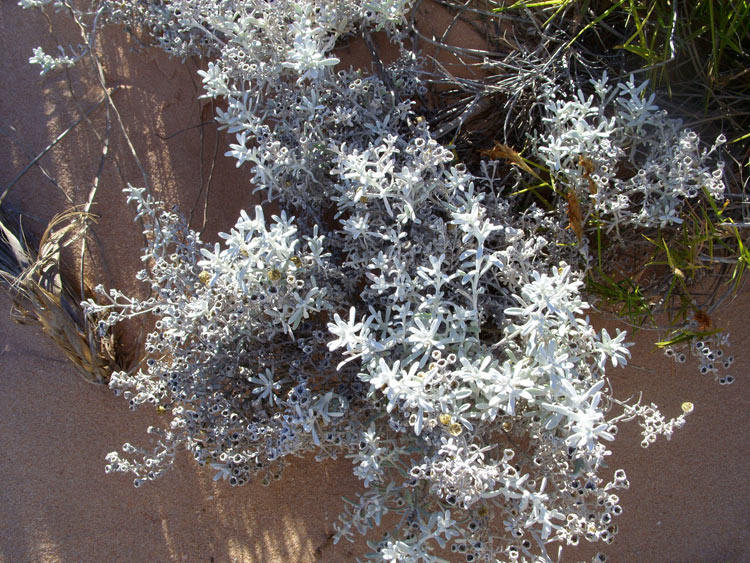

Scientific classification
- Kingdom: Plantae
- Clade: Tracheophytes
- Clade: Angiosperms
- Clade: Eudicots
- Clade: Asterids
- Order: Asterales
- Family: Asteraceae
- Genus: Angianthus
- Species: A. cunninghamii

Binomial name
- Angianthus cunninghamii DC.) Benth.

Synonyms
- Eriocladium pyramidatum Lindl.; Skirrhophorus cunninghami DC. orth. var.; Skirrhophorus cunninghamii DC.; Styloncerus cunninghamii (DC.) Kuntze

= Angianthus cunninghamii =

Species of plant

Angianthus cunninghamii is a species of flowering plant in the family Asteraceae, and is endemic to the coast of Western Australia. It is a much-branched, bushy shrub with densely hairy, lance-shaped or egg-shaped leaves, egg-shaped compound heads of yellow flowers, and conical achenes.

== Description ==
Angianthus cunninghamii is a much-branched, bushy shrub that typically grows to a height of 20–50 cm (7.9–19.7 in), the stems erect and densely hairy. The leaves are densely hairy, lance-shaped with the narrower end towards the base, or egg-shaped, 5–20 mm (0.20–0.79 in) long and 2–3 mm (0.079–0.118 in) wide. The flowers are yellow and borne in egg-shaped compound heads of 25 to 50 pseudanthia, the heads 5–9 mm (0.20–0.35 in) long and 4.5–8 mm (0.18–0.31 in) wide with about 20 densely hairy, leaf-like bracts at the base. Flowering occurs from February to August or from November to December, and the achenes are more or less conical, 0.9–1.4 mm (0.035–0.055 in) long and about 0.5–0.6 mm (0.020–0.024 in) in diameter.

== Taxonomy ==
This species was first formally described in 1838 by Augustin Pyramus de Candolle who gave it the name Skirrhophorus cunninghamii in his Prodromus Systematis Naturalis Regni Vegetabilis from specimens collected on Dirk Hartog Island by Allan Cunningham. In 1867, George Bentham transferred the species to the genus Angianthus as A. cunninghamii in his Flora Australiensis. The specific epithet (cunninghamii) honours the collector of the type specimens.

== Distribution and habitat ==
This species of Angianthus grows in sand on coastal limestone, sand dunes and salt pans on the coast and coastal islands from near Karratha and south to Perth in the Carnarvon, Geraldton Sandplains, Pilbara, Swan Coastal Plain and Yalgoo bioregions of Western Australia.

== Conservation status ==
Angianthus cunninghamii is listed as "not threatened" by the Government of Western Australia, Department of Biodiversity, Conservation and Attractions.
