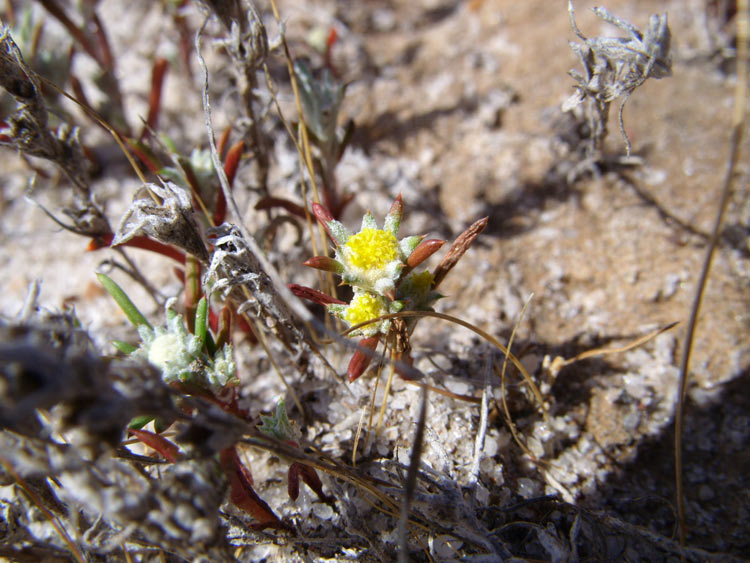
- About 10 km (6.2 mi) east of Meckering

Conservation status
- Priority Three — Poorly Known Taxa (DEC)

Scientific classification
- Kingdom: Plantae
- Clade: Tracheophytes
- Clade: Angiosperms
- Clade: Eudicots
- Clade: Asterids
- Order: Asterales
- Family: Asteraceae
- Genus: Angianthus
- Species: A. micropodioides

Binomial name
- Angianthus micropodioides (Benth.) Benth.

= Angianthus micropodioides =

Species of plant

Angianthus micropodioides is a species of flowering plant in the family Asteraceae, and is endemic to the west of Western Australia. It is an erect or low-lying annual herb with linear or lance-shaped leaves, oval to broadly oval compound heads of 10 to 30 yellow-white flowers, and oval achenes with a scaly pappus.

== Description ==
Angianthus micropodioides is an erect or low-lying annual herb with stems 40–150 mm (1.6–5.9 in) long and hairy. The leaves are linear to lance-shaped, 5–15 mm (0.20–0.59 in) long and 0.5–1 mm (0.020–0.039 in) wide. The flowers are yellow-white and borne in oval to broadly oval compound heads of 10 to 30 pseudanthia, the heads 4–6 mm (0.16–0.24 in) long and 4–5 mm (0.16–0.20 in) in diameter. There are two concave bracts 2.4–3.1 mm (0.094–0.122 in) long and two flat egg-shaped bracts, 2.4–3.1 mm (0.094–0.122 in) long at the base of the pseudanthia. Flowering occurs in December or from January to February, and the achenes are oval and hairy, about 0.8–1.0 mm (0.031–0.039 in) long and 0.5–0.6 mm (0.020–0.024 in) wide with a pappus of five or six jagged scales.

== Taxonomy ==
This species was first formally described in 1837 by George Bentham who gave it the name Phyllocalymma micropodioides in Plantae Preissianae from specimens collected near the Swan River Colony by Charles von Hügel. In 1867, Bentham transferred the species to Angianthus as A. micropodioides in his Flora Australiensis. The specific epithet (micropodioides) means 'like the genus Micropodium'. (Micropodium is now a synonym of Asplenium).

== Distribution and habitat ==
This species of angianthus grows in saline, sandy soils on river edges, saline depressions and claypans in the Avon Wheatbelt, Coolgardie, Geraldton Sandplains and Swan Coastal Plain bioregions in the west of Western Australia.

== Conservation status ==
Angianthus micropodioides is listed as "Priority Three" by the Government of Western Australia, Department of Biodiversity, Conservation and Attractions, meaning that it is poorly known and known from only a few locations but is not under imminent threat.
