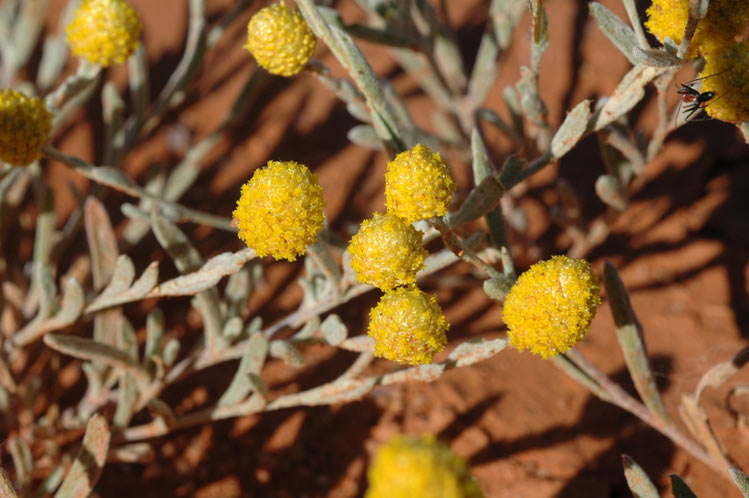

Scientific classification
- Kingdom: Plantae
- Clade: Tracheophytes
- Clade: Angiosperms
- Clade: Eudicots
- Clade: Asterids
- Order: Asterales
- Family: Asteraceae
- Genus: Angianthus
- Species: A. milnei

Binomial name
- Angianthus milnei Benth.

= Angianthus milnei =

Species of plant

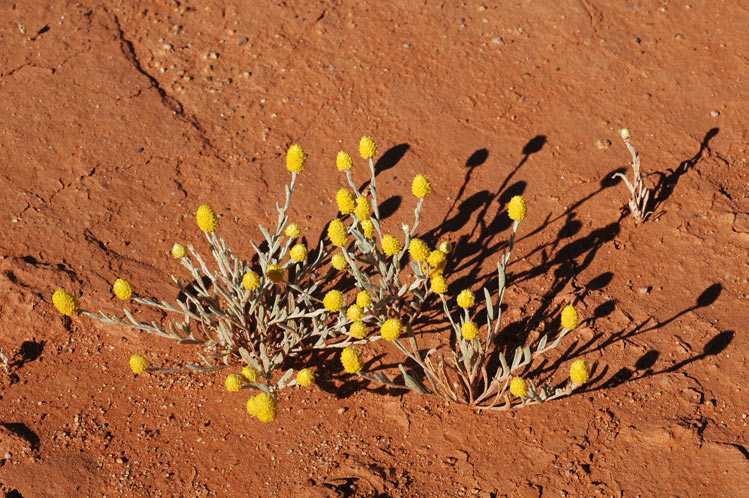
Habit on Middalya Station

Angianthus milnei, commonly known as cone-spike angianthus, is a species of flowering plant in the family Asteraceae, and is endemic to the north-west of Western Australia. It is an erect or ascending annual herb with narrowly elliptic or lance-shaped leaves, narrowly elliptic or elliptic compound heads of 100 to 400 yellow flowers, and oval achenes lacking a pappus.

== Description ==
Angianthus milnei is an erect or ascending annual herb that typically grows to a height of 6–26 cm (2.4–10.2 in) with hairy stems. The leaves are arranged alternately, narrowly elliptic to lance-shaped, sometimes with the narrower end towards the base, 10–65 mm (0.39–2.56 in) long and 1–4 mm (0.039–0.157 in) wide. The flowers are yellow and borne in narrowly elliptic to elliptic compound heads of 100 to 400 pseudanthia, the heads 5–20 mm (0.20–0.79 in) long and 5–9 mm (0.20–0.35 in) in diameter. There are two concave bracts 2.4–3.4 mm (0.094–0.134 in) long and two flat lance-shaped, egg-shaped or narrowly elliptic bracts, 2.4–3.5 mm (0.094–0.138 in) long at the base of the pseudanthia. Flowering occurs from August to November, and the achenes are oval and hairy, about 0.6–0.9 mm (0.024–0.035 in) long, about 0.3 mm (0.012 in) wide and lack a pappus.

== Taxonomy ==
Angianthus milnei was first formally described in 1867 by George Bentham in his Flora Australiensis from specimens collected near Shark Bay by William Grant Milne. The specific epithet (milnei) honours the collector of the type specimens, who was a botanist on HMS Herald, which visited Shark Bay in 1857.

== Distribution and habitat ==
This species of angianthus grows on the edges of saline depressions or in open shrublan or grassland and is common in the Carnarvon, Gascoyne, Geraldton Sandplains, Murchison, Pilbara and Yalgoo bioregions in the north-west of Western Australia.

== Conservation status ==
Angianthus milnei is listed as "not threatened" by the Government of Western Australia, Department of Biodiversity, Conservation and Attractions.
