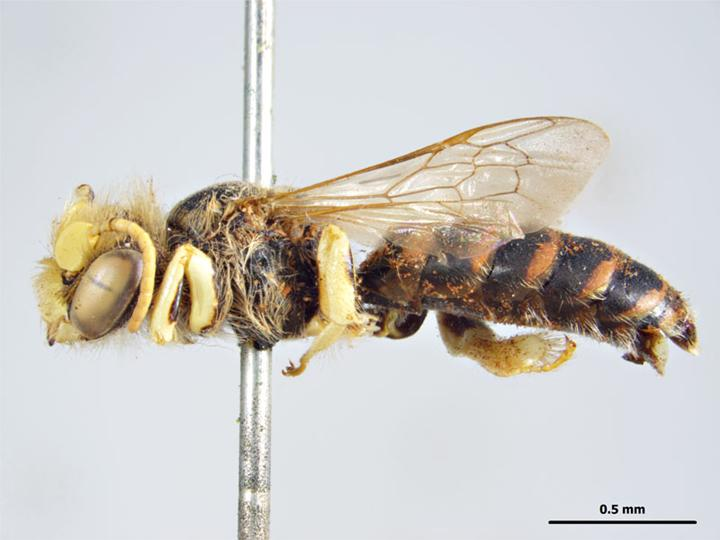

Scientific classification
- Kingdom: Animalia
- Phylum: Arthropoda
- Clade: Pancrustacea
- Class: Insecta
- Order: Hymenoptera
- Family: Colletidae
- Genus: Neopasiphae
- Species: N. insignis

Binomial name
- Neopasiphae insignis Rayment, 1930

= Neopasiphae insignis =

Species of bee

Neopasiphae insignis is a species of bee in the family Colletidae and the subfamily Colletinae. It is endemic to Australia. It was described in 1930 by Australian entomologist Tarlton Rayment.

== Description ==
The body length of the holotype is 10 mm. Colouration is mainly black and yellow.

== Distribution and habitat ==
Rayment considered that the type locality was probably somewhere in Victoria, though the exact location is unknown.

== Behaviour ==
The adults are flying mellivores.
