= Angianthus drummondii =

Scientific classification
- Kingdom: Plantae
- Clade: Tracheophytes
- Clade: Angiosperms
- Clade: Eudicots
- Clade: Asterids
- Order: Asterales
- Family: Asteraceae
- Genus: Angianthus
- Species: A. drummondii

Binomial name
- Angianthus drummondii (Turcz.) Benth.

Synonyms
- Angianthus drummondi Benth. orth. var.; Scirrhophorus drummondii Turcz. orth. var.; Skirrhophorus drummondii Turcz.; Styloncerus drummondii (Turcz.) Kuntze

Species of plant

Angianthus drummondii is a species of flowering plant in the family Asteraceae, and is endemic to a restricted area of south-west of Western Australia. It is an erect annual herb with densely hairy, lance-shaped or egg-shaped leaves, egg-shaped compound heads of yellow flowers, and oval achenes.

== Description ==
Angianthus drummondii is an erect shrub that typically grows to a height of 10 cm (3.9 in), the stems erect and densely hairy. The leaves are hairy, more or less linear, 5–10 mm (0.20–0.39 in) long and 10 mm (0.39 in) wide with a small point on the tip. The flowers are yellow and borne in egg-shaped compound heads of 20 to 60 pseudanthia, the heads oval, 4–6 mm (0.16–0.24 in) long and 5–7 mm (0.20–0.28 in) wide with about 10 densely hairy, leaf-like bracts at the base. Flowering occurs from October to December, and the achenes are more or less oval, about 0.8 mm (0.031 in) long and 0.3 mm (0.012 in) in diameter, the pappus a small, jagged ring.

== Taxonomy ==
This species was first formally described in 1851 by Nikolai Turczaninow who gave it the name Skirrhophorus drummondii in the Bulletin de la Société Impériale des Naturalistes de Moscou from specimens collected by James Drummond. In 1867, George Bentham transferred the species to the genus Angianthus as A. drummondii in his Flora Australiensis. The specific epithet (drummondii) honours the collector of the type specimens.

== Distribution and habitat ==
This species of Angianthus grows in clay soils on ironstone in winter-wet flats in Melaleuca shrubland or low woodland in the Jarrah Forest and Swan Coastal Plain bioregions of Western Australia.

== Conservation status ==
Angianthus drummondii is listed as "Priority Three", meaning that it is poorly known and known from only a few locations but is not under imminent threat.
