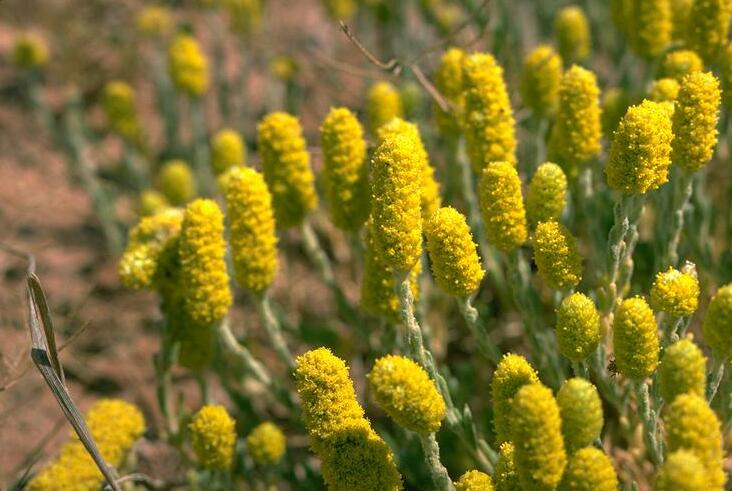

Scientific classification
- Kingdom: Plantae
- Clade: Tracheophytes
- Clade: Angiosperms
- Clade: Eudicots
- Clade: Asterids
- Order: Asterales
- Family: Asteraceae
- Genus: Angianthus
- Species: A. cyathifer

Binomial name
- Angianthus cyathifer Short

Synonyms
- Angianthus tomentosus auct. non J.C.Wendl.: Chippendale, G.M. (1961)

= Angianthus cyathifer =

Species of plant

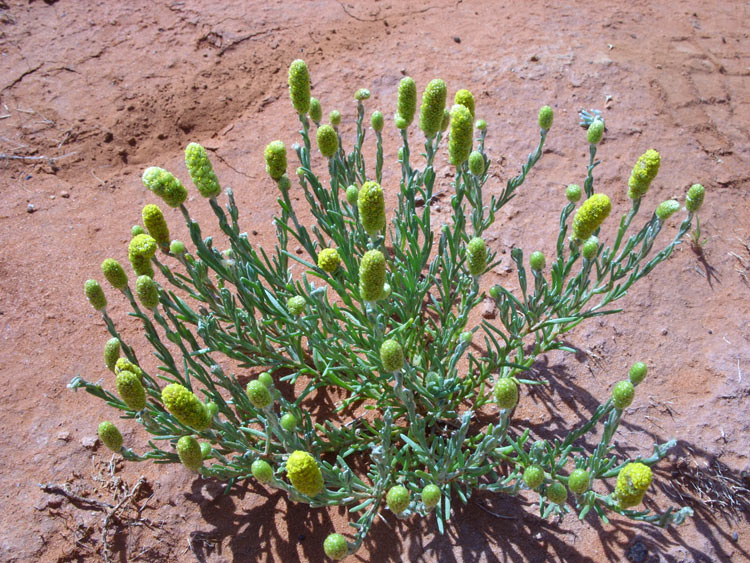
Habit near Mount Ebenezer

Angianthus cyathifer is a species of flowering plant in the family Asteraceae, and is endemic to north-western Australia. It is an ascending or low-lying, rarely erect annual herb, with hairy linear or elliptic leaves, narrowly elliptic to elliptic compound heads of yellow flowers, and oval achenes with a cup-shaped pappus.

== Description ==
Angianthus cyathifer is an ascending or low-lying annual herb that typically grows to a height of 8–18 cm (3.1–7.1 in), the stems usually not distinct from the major branches. The leaves are arranged alternately, hairy, more or less linear to narrowly elliptic or elliptic, 5–25 mm (0.20–0.98 in) long and about 1 mm (0.039 in) wide. The flowers are yellow and borne in egg-shaped compound heads of 100 to 500 pseudanthia, the heads 12–25 mm (0.47–0.98 in) long and about 5 mm (0.20 in) wide. There are two concave bracts 2.0–2.7 mm (0.079–0.106 in) long and two flat bracts 2.2–2.6 mm (0.087–0.102 in) long tapered at the base. Flowering occurs from July to September, and the achenes are egg-shaped with the narrower end towards the base, 0.5–0.7 mm (0.020–0.028 in) long and about 0.2–0.3 mm (0.0079–0.0118 in) wide. The pappus is more or less cup-shaped.

== Taxonomy ==
Angianthus cyathifer was first formally described in 1983 by Philip Sydney Short in the journal Muelleria from specimens collected on Erldunda Station in 1974. The specific epithet (cyathifer) means 'cup-bearing' referring to the pappus.

== Distribution and habitat ==
This species of Angianthus grows in sandy or clay soils near saline depressions in the Central Ranges, Gascoyne, Great Sandy Desert, Great Victoria Desert, Little Sandy Desert, Murchison, Pilbara and Tanami bioregions of Western Australia, and the Central Ranges, Finke, Great Sandy Desert, Little Sandy Desert, Pilbara, Simpson Strzelecki Dunefields and Tanami bioregions of south-western Northern Territory.

== Conservation status ==
Angianthus cyathifer is listed as "not threatened" by the Government of Western Australia, Department of Biodiversity, Conservation and Attractions and as of "least concern" under the Northern Territory Territory Parks and Wildlife Conservation Act.
