= Angianthus microcephalus =

Conservation status
- Priority Two — Poorly Known Taxa (DEC)

Scientific classification
- Kingdom: Plantae
- Clade: Tracheophytes
- Clade: Angiosperms
- Clade: Eudicots
- Clade: Asterids
- Order: Asterales
- Family: Asteraceae
- Genus: Angianthus
- Species: A. microcephalus

Binomial name
- Angianthus microcephalus (F.Muell.) Benth.

Species of plant

Angianthus microcephalus, commonly known as small-headed angianthus, is a species of flowering plant in the family Asteraceae, and is endemic to the far west of Western Australia. It is a low-lying or ascending annual herb with succulent, narrowly elliptic or more or less linear leaves, broadly oval to very broadly oval compound heads of 10 to 40 yellow flowers, and oval achenes with a scaly pappus.

== Description ==
Angianthus microcephalus is a low-lying or ascending annual herb with stems 60–100 mm (2.4–3.9 in) long and sometimes hairy. The leaves are succulent, narrowly elliptic to more or less linear, 3–10 mm (0.12–0.39 in) long and about 1 mm (0.039 in) wide. The flowers are yellow and borne in broadly oval to very broadly oval compound heads of 10 to 40 pseudanthia, the heads 3.5–6 mm (0.14–0.24 in) long and 3.5–5 mm (0.14–0.20 in) in diameter. There are two concave bracts about 1.7–2 mm (0.067–0.079 in) long at the base of the pseudanthia. Flowering occurs from September to December, and the achenes are oval, about 0.45–0.6 mm (0.018–0.024 in) long and 0.2 mm (0.0079 in) wide with a pappus of two or three egg-shaped scales.

== Taxonomy ==
This species was first formally described in 1863 by Ferdinand von Mueller who gave it the name Cephalosorus microcephalus from specimens collected near the Murchison River by Augustus Oldfield. In 1867, George Bentham transferred the species to Angianthus as A. microcephalus in his Flora Australiensis. The specific epithet (microcephalus) means 'small-headed'.

== Distribution and habitat ==
Small-headed angianthus grows in sandy or clayey soils in salt swaps and pans in the Carnarvon, Geraldton Sandplains, Murchison and Yalgoo bioregions in the far west of Western Australia.

== Conservation status ==
Angianthus microcephalus is listed as "Priority Two" by the Government of Western Australia Department of Biodiversity, Conservation and Attractions, meaning that it is poorly known and from one or a few locations.
