= Hakea brachyptera =

Conservation status
- Priority Three — Poorly Known Taxa (DEC)

Scientific classification
- Kingdom: Plantae
- Clade: Tracheophytes
- Clade: Angiosperms
- Clade: Eudicots
- Order: Proteales
- Family: Proteaceae
- Genus: Hakea
- Species: H. brachyptera

Binomial name
- Hakea brachyptera Meisn.
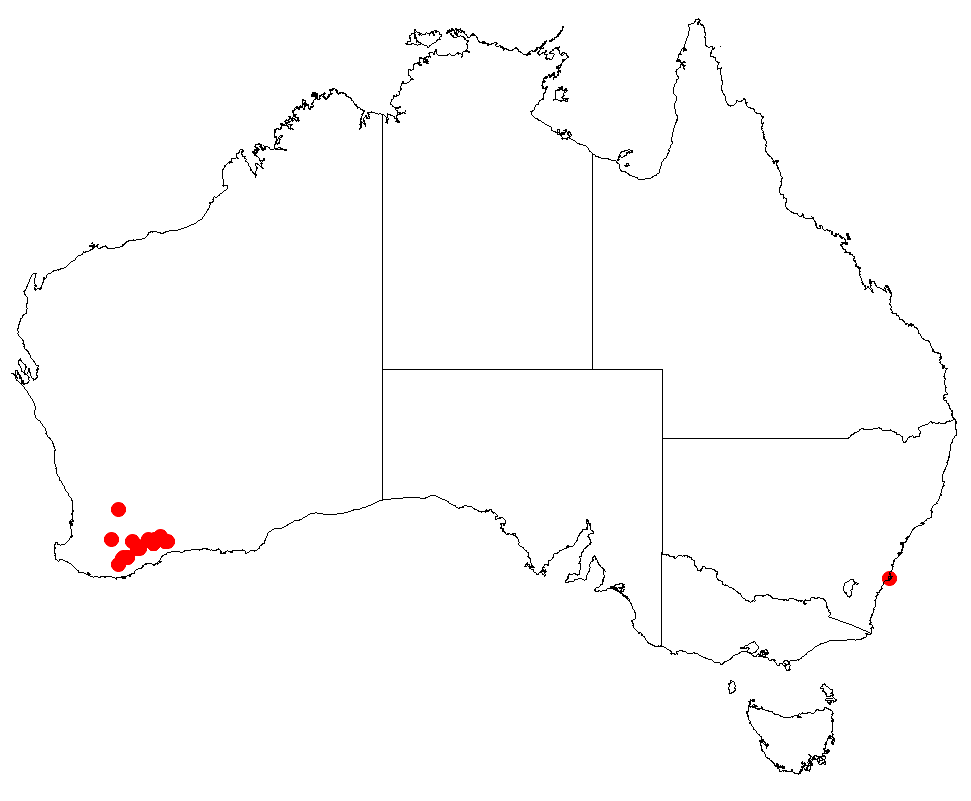
- Occurrence data from Australasian Virtual Herbarium

Species of shrub native to Western Australia

Hakea brachyptera, commonly known as the short-winged hakea, is a shrub in the family Proteaceae native to an area in the southern Wheatbelt and Great Southern regions of Western Australia.

== Description ==
Hakea brachyptera is a low, dense, rounded shrub to 1 m (3 ft) tall with interweaving rusty coloured branchlets. The leaves are rounded, fine and stiff 3–9.5 mm (0.1–0.4 in) long and 0.7–1.3 mm (0.03–0.05 in) wide. Leaves are densely covered with finely matted hairs ending with a very sharp erect point. Clusters of flowers appear in racemes of 1-5 individual flowers in the leaf axils. The white pedicel is 1.5–2.5 mm (0.06–0.1 in) long with flat matted silky hairs. Fruit are rounded, at right angles to the stalks and are 2 cm (0.8 in) long and about 2 cm (0.8 in) wide, slightly flattened and with a rough surface.

== Taxonomy and naming ==
Hakea brachyptera was first formally described by Carl Meisner in 1856 and published in de Candolle's Prodromus Systematis Naturalis Regni Vegetabilis. The specific epithet (brachyptera) is derived from the Ancient Greek words brachys meaning "short" and pteron meaning "wing" or "fin" referring to the seed structure.

== Distribution and habitat ==
Hakea brachyptera is found in southwest Western Australian, from near Wagin to Lake Magenta and south near the Stirling Range. Hakea brachyptera requires a well-drained site with a sunny aspect and sandy loam, clay or gravel.

== Conservation status ==
Hakea brachyptera is classified as "Priority Three" by the Government of Western Australia Department of Parks and Wildlife, meaning that it is rare or near threatened, due to its restricted distribution.

== Use in horticulture ==
Hakea brachyptera is a frost-tolerant species.
