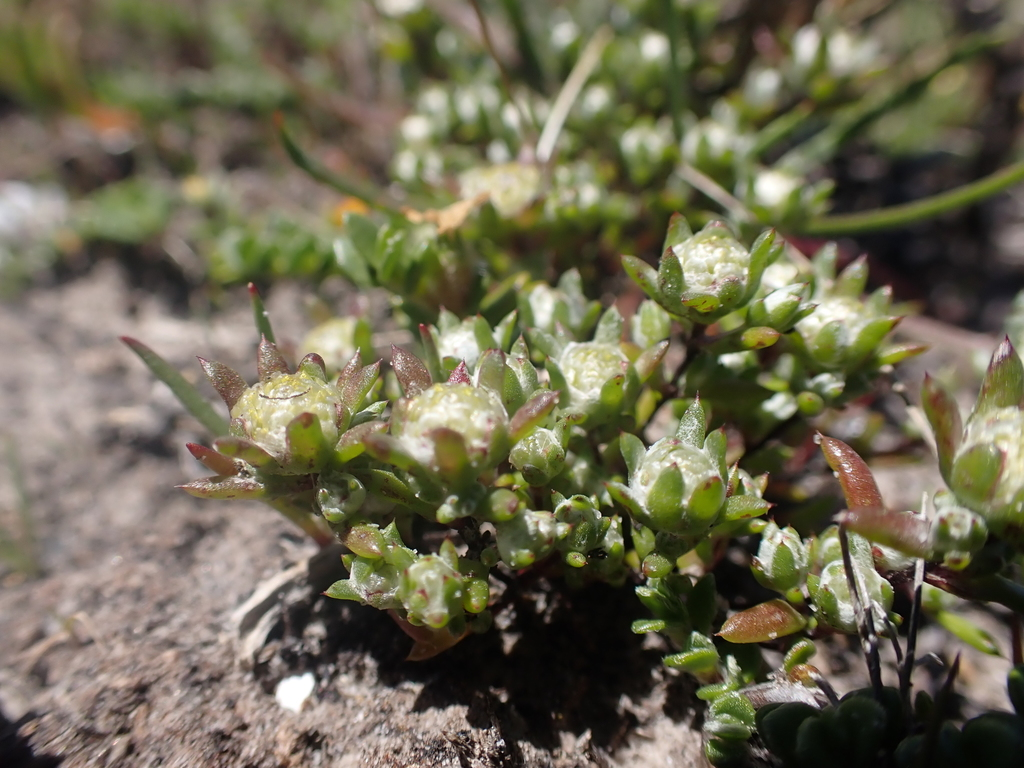
- Near Altona

Scientific classification
- Kingdom: Plantae
- Clade: Embryophytes
- Clade: Tracheophytes
- Clade: Angiosperms
- Clade: Eudicots
- Clade: Asterids
- Order: Asterales
- Family: Asteraceae
- Genus: Angianthus
- Species: A. preissianus

Binomial name
- Angianthus preissianus (Steetz) Benth.

Synonyms
- List: Angianthus eriocephalus (Hook.f. ex A.Gray) Benth.; Skirrhophorus eriocephalus Hook.f. ex A.Gray; Skirrhophorus preissianus Steetz; Skirrophorus eriocephalus A.Gray orth. var.; Skirrophorus preissianus J.M.Black & E.L.Robertson orth. var.; Styloncerus eriocephalus (A.Gray) Kuntze; Styloncerus preissianus (Steetz) Kuntze

= Angianthus preissianus =

Species of flowering plant

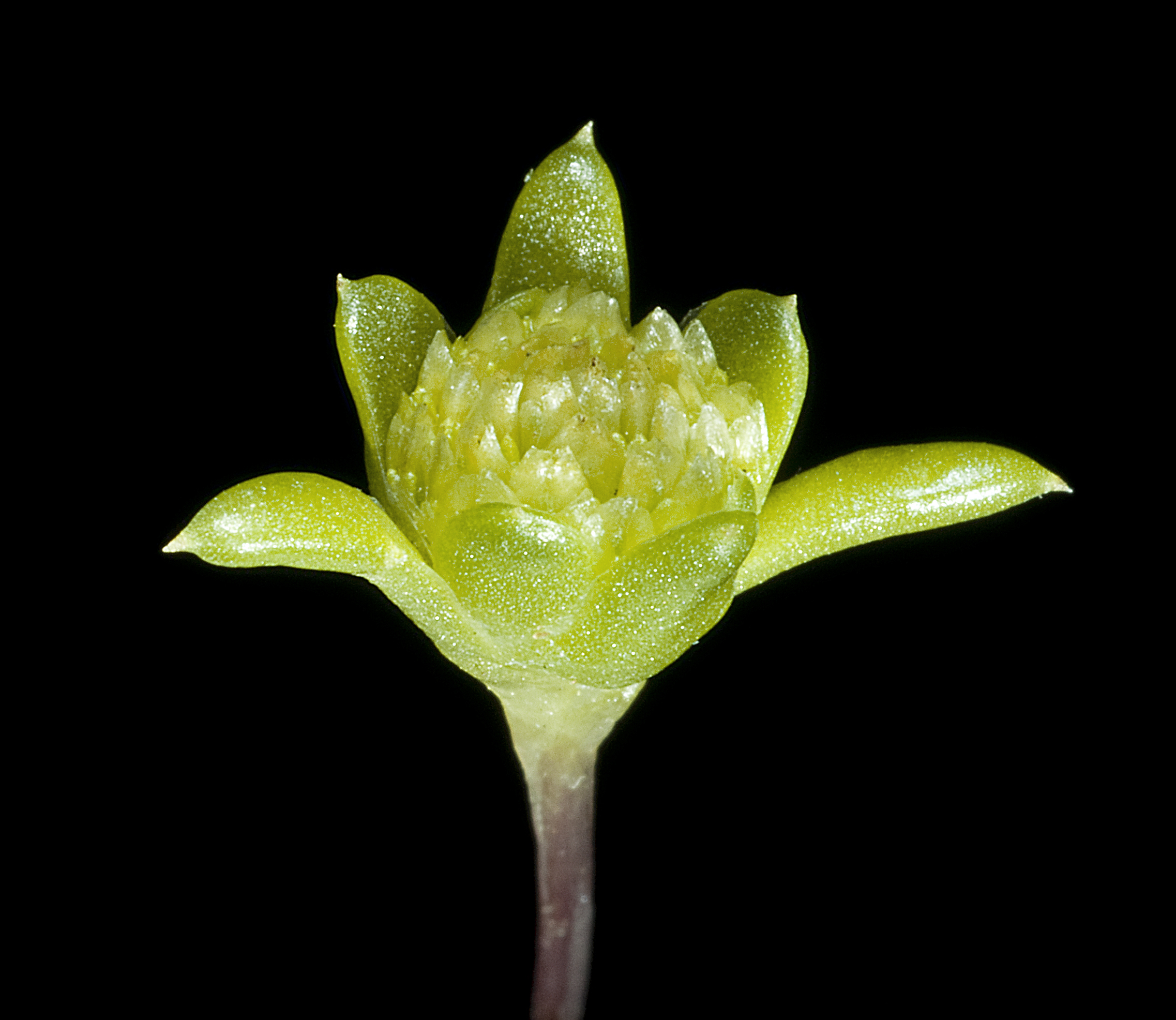
Flower detail

Angianthus preissianus, commonly known as common cup-flower, salt angianthus or salt cup-flower, is a species of flowering plant in the family Asteraceae, and is endemic to southern Australia. It is a prostrate to erect annual herb with narrowly elliptic leaves, compound heads of 5 to 100 yellow flowers, and egg-shaped achenes without a pappus.

== Description ==
Angianthus preissianus is a prostrate to erect annual herb that typically grows to a height of 1–8 cm (0.39–3.15 in), usually with several stems from the base, sometimes glabrous or hairy. The leaves are narrowly elliptic to more or less linear, sometimes succulent, 5–12 mm (0.20–0.47 in) long and 1–2 mm (0.039–0.079 in) wide. The flowers are yellow and borne in compound heads of 5 to 100 pseudanthia, the heads 4–10 mm (0.16–0.39 in) long and 4–11 mm (0.16–0.43 in) wide. There are conspicuous involucral bracts at the base of the compound heads, and one or two bracts 1.6–2.3 mm (0.063–0.091 in) long at the base of the pseudanthia. Flowering occurs from September to January, and the achenes are egg-shaped, 0.5–0.8 mm (0.020–0.031 in) long and about 0.3 mm (0.012 in) in diameter without a pappus.

== Taxonomy ==
This species was first formally described in 1845 by Joachim Steetz who gave it the name Skirrhophorus preissianus in Plantae Preissianae, from specimens collected in 1838. In 1867, George Bentham transferred the species to Angianthus as A. preissianus.

== Distribution and habitat ==
Angianthus preissianus is common in saline habitats, winter-wet flats, claypans and granite outcrops in the Avon Wheatbelt, Coolgardie, Esperance Plains, Geraldton Sandplains, Jarrah Forest, Mallee, Swan Coastal Plain and Warren bioregions of south-west of Western Australia, the southern lofty, southern-eastern, Eyre peninsula, Murray, Yorke Peninsula and Kangaroo Island bioregions of South Australia, the south of Victoria and Tasmania.
