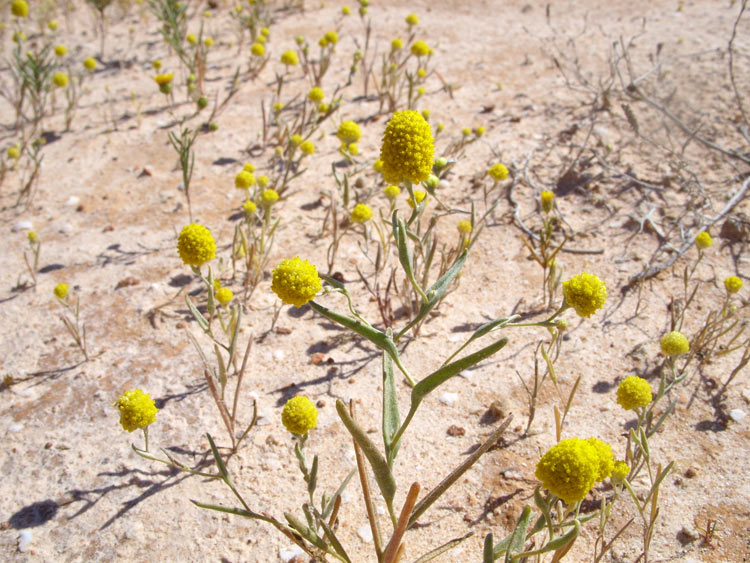
- Angianthus acrohyalinus

Scientific classification
- Kingdom: Plantae
- Clade: Embryophytes
- Clade: Tracheophytes
- Clade: Angiosperms
- Clade: Eudicots
- Clade: Asterids
- Order: Asterales
- Family: Asteraceae
- Subfamily: Asteroideae
- Tribe: Gnaphalieae
- Genus: Angianthus; J.C.Wendl., nom. cons.

Synonyms
- Gamozygis Turcz.; Cylindrosorus Benth.; Chromochiton Cass.; Hirnellia Cass.; Skirrhophorus DC.; Cassinia R.Br. 1813, rejected name, not R.Br. 1817; Phyllocalymma Benth.; Eriocladium Lindl.

= Angianthus =

Genus of flowering plants

Angianthus is a genus of flowering plants in the family Asteraceae. All species of this genus are endemic to Australia.

== Taxonomy ==
The genus was first described by Johann Christoph Wendland in 1810, for the species Angianthus tomentosus. The genus name derives from the Greek: angeion, a vessel or cup, and anthos, flower, and refers to the cup-like shape of the ring of broad pappus-scales. Angianthus tomentosus, although originally the type species, is now considered to be a synonym of Siloxerus tomentosus, but the genus name Angianthus is conserved against Siloxerus.

=== Species ===
As of May 2024, Plants of the World Online accepted the following species:

- Angianthus acrohyalinus Morrison – hook-leaf angianthus (W.A.)
- Angianthus brachypappus F.Muell. – spreading angianthus, spreading cup-flower (S.A., N.S.W., Vic.)
- Angianthus conocephalus (J.M.Black) P.S.Short (W.A., S.A.)
- Angianthus cornutus P.S.Short (W.A.)
- Angianthus cunninghamii Benth. – coastal angianthus (W.A.)
- Angianthus cyathifer P.S.Short (W.A., N.T.)
- Angianthus drummondii Benth. (W.A.)
- Angianthus glabratus P.S.Short – smooth cup-flower (S.A.)
- Angianthus globuliformis M.Lyons & Keighery (W.A.)
- Angianthus halophilus Keighery (W.A.)
- Angianthus microcephalus Benth. – small-headed angianthus (W.A.)
- Angianthus micropodioides (Benth.) Benth. (W.A.)
- Angianthus milnei Benth. – cone-spike angianthus (W.A.)
- Angianthus newbeyi P.S.Short (W.A.)
- Angianthus phyllocalymmeus (F.Muell.) Druce – saltlake candle-daisy (S.A.)
- Angianthus preissianus (Steetz) Benth. – common cup-flower, salt angianthus, salt cup-flower (W.A., S.A., Vic., Tas.)
- Angianthus prostratus P.S.Short (W.A.)
- Angianthus pygmaeus Benth. – pygmy angianthus (W.A.)
- Angianthus uniflorus P.S.Short (W.A.)

== Gallery ==
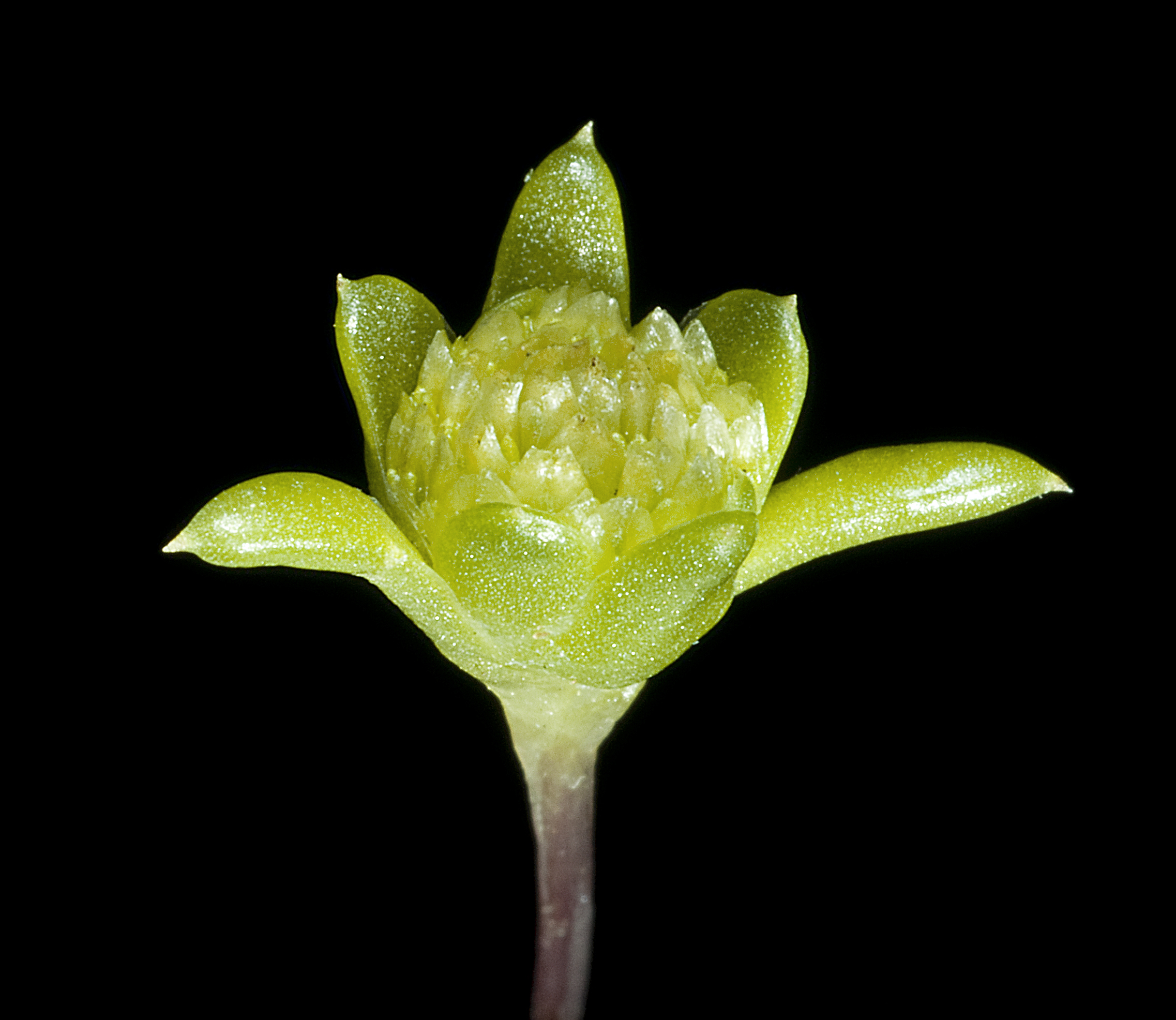
A. preissianus

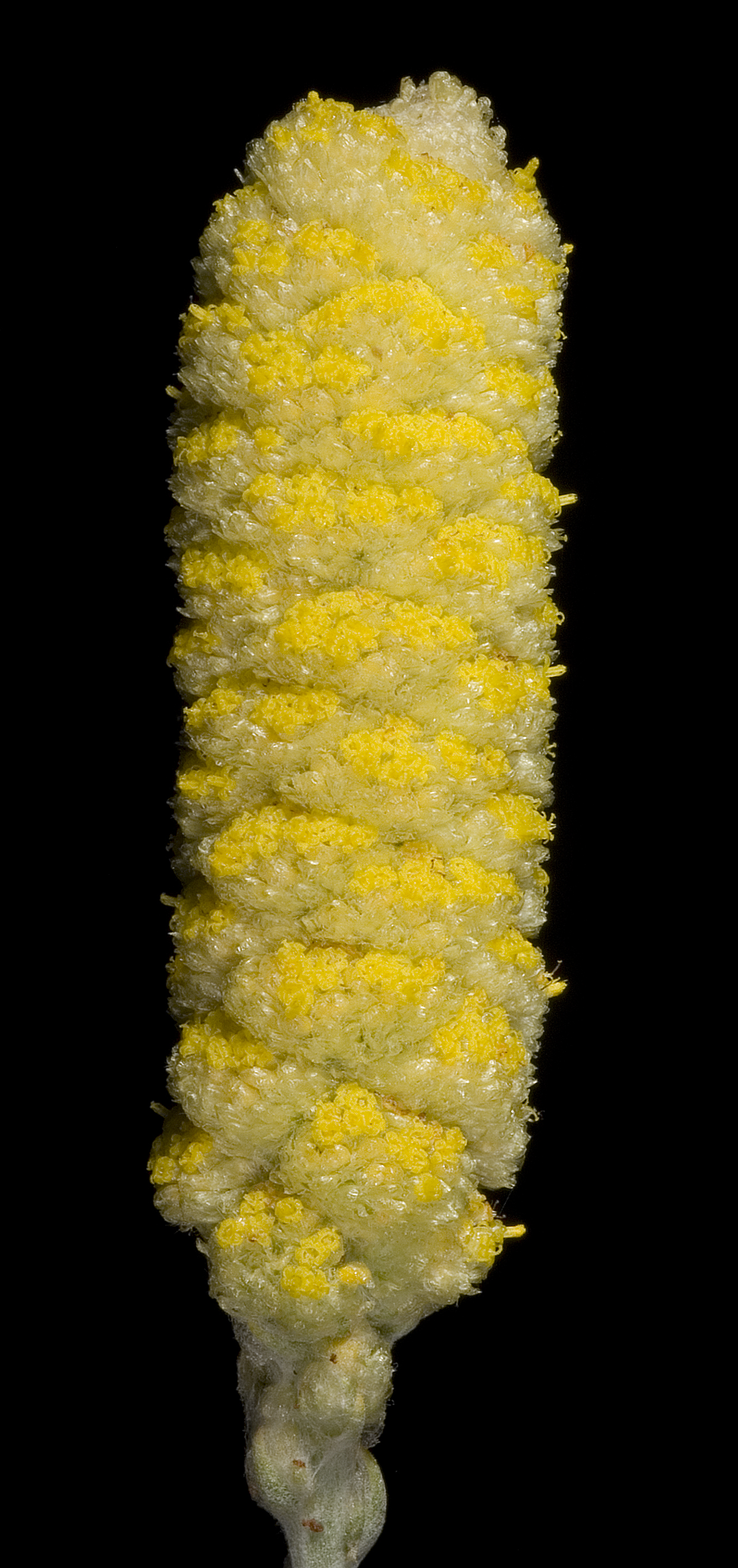
A. acrohyalinus
