= Bon Bon Reserve =

Protected area in South Australia

- IUCN category II (national park)
- Location within South Australia
- Location: South Australia
- Nearest city: Roxby Downs
- Coordinates: 30.5286°S 135.5265°E
- Area: 2,164.53 km^{2} (835.73 sq mi)
- Established: 2008
- Governing body: Bush Heritage Australia
- Website: bushheritage.org.au/our_reserves/state_southaustralia/reserves_bonbon

Bon Bon Reserve is a 2,164-square-kilometre (836-square-mile) private protected area located in the Australian state of South Australia, west of the town of Roxby Downs in the Woomera Prohibited Area. It is owned and managed by Bush Heritage Australia (BHA). It forms an important link of protected land between Yellabinna Regional Reserve and Wabma Kadarbu Mound Springs Conservation Park.

== History ==
Bon Bon Reserve was a sheep station for 150 years before being purchased by BHA in 2008 with assistance from the Australian and South Australian governments. The station ran an average of approximately 15,000 head of sheep between 1970 and 1989, with flocks exceeding 23,000 at times prior to this. The owner of Bon Bon Station, grazier Paul Blight, sold the property to BHA in 2008 for A$4 million with the state and federal governments sharing in the cost. Blight had kept stock numbers low to give the vegetation a chance to regenerate and wanted the property to continue to be managed in an environmentally sensitive manner.

The land occupying the extent of the Bon Bon reserve was gazetted by the Government of South Australia as a locality in April 2013 under the name "Bon Bon".

== Landscape and vegetation ==
Bon Bon Reserve is characterised by arid-zone woodlands, mulga shrublands, bluebush plains and salt lakes. At the heart of the property is Lake Puckridge, an 8-by-8-kilometre (5.0 by 5.0 mi), ephemeral freshwater wetland that only fills, on average, every ten years, when it becomes an important site for many waders and waterbirds. The property also contains stands of sandalwood.

== Fauna ==
Threatened animal species either known or thought likely to be present on Bon Bon Reserve include plains-wanderer, Major Mitchell's cockatoo, chestnut-breasted whiteface, thick-billed grasswren and southern hairy-nosed wombat.

== Protected area status ==
Bon Bon Reserve has protected area status within the Australian National Reserve System due to the property being subject to a conservation covenant where BHA has agreed to it being "reserved in perpetuity". Bon Bon Reserve is classified as an IUCN Category II protected area.

== See also ==
- Protected areas of South Australia
- List of reduplicated Australian place names
