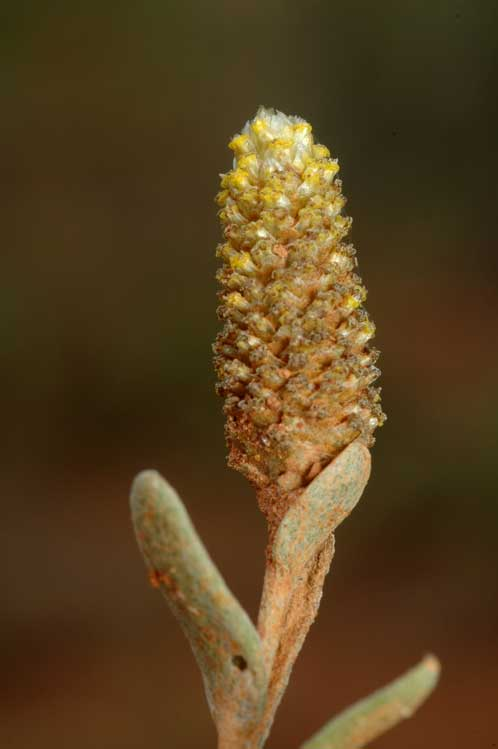
- Near Denham

Scientific classification
- Kingdom: Plantae
- Clade: Embryophytes
- Clade: Tracheophytes
- Clade: Angiosperms
- Clade: Eudicots
- Clade: Asterids
- Order: Asterales
- Family: Asteraceae
- Genus: Angianthus
- Species: A. brachypappus

Binomial name
- Angianthus brachypappus F.Muell.

Synonyms
- Angianthus brachypappus F.Muell. nom. inval., nom. nud.; Angianthus brachypappus F.Muell. isonym; Angianthus brachypappus F.Muell. var. brachypappus; Siloxerus brachypappus (F.Muell.) Ising; Styloncerus brachypappus (F.Muell.) Kuntze

= Angianthus brachypappus =

Species of flowering plant

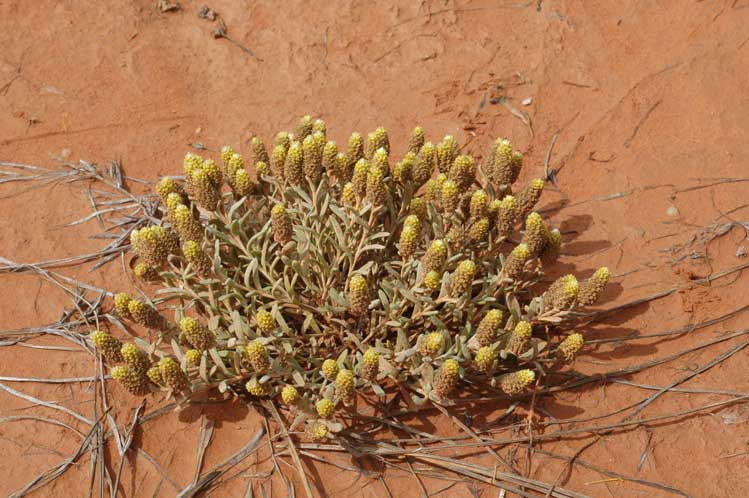
Habit south of Milparinka in far western New South Wales

Angianthus brachypappus, commonly known as spreading angianthus or spreading cup-flower, is a species of flowering plant in the family Asteraceae, and is endemic to south-eastern continental Australia. It is an erect or low-lying annual herb with woolly, narrowly lance-shaped, narrowly elliptic to more or less linear leaves, oval or elliptic compound heads of yellow flowers, and oval achenes with a bristly pappus.

== Description ==
Angianthus brachypappus is an erect or low-lying, hairy, annual herb that typically grows to a height of 5–13.5 cm (2.0–5.3 in), usually forming branches at the base and/or near the top of plants. The leaves are hairy, lance-shaped with the narrower end towards the base, sometimes narrowly elliptic to more or less linear, 10–30 mm (0.39–1.18 in) long and 1–5 mm (0.039–0.197 in) wide. The flowers are borne in oval or elliptic compound heads of 100–300 pseudanthia, the heads 10–25 mm (0.39–0.98 in) long and 5–8 mm (0.20–0.31 in) wide. Flowering occurs from September to December, and the achenes are oval, 0.5–0.8 mm (0.020–0.031 in) long and about 0.8–1.3 mm (0.031–0.051 in) wide, the pappus often with 1 or 2 bristles.

== Taxonomy ==
Angianthus brachypappus was first formally described in 1855 by Ferdinand von Mueller in his Definitions of rare or hitherto undescribed Australian plants from specimens collected "on barren plains near "Swanhill"".

== Distribution and habitat ==
This species of Angianthus grows in sandy soils in open areas, sometimes near saline depressions, in north-eastern South Australia, western New South Wales and north-western Victoria.

== Conservation status ==
Angianthus brachypappus is listed as "endangered" under the Victorian Government Flora and Fauna Guarantee Act 1988.
