= Kenneth Newbey =

Kenneth Raymond Newbey (11 June 1936 – 24 July 1988) was a plant ecologist, botanical collector, and horticulturist. Born in Katanning, Western Australia, he collected over 12,000 specimens from the Albany-Esperance, Wheatbelt, goldfields, and Pilbara regions of Western Australia.

He died in White Gum Valley in 1988. His collection was incorporated into the CALM office in Albany. The shrubs Leucopogon newbeyi and Acacia newbeyi were named in his honour.

== Publications ==
Publications include

- West Australian Wildflowers for Horticulture (1968, two volumes), one of the seminal works introducing native plants into horticulture in Western Australia
- Newbey, Kenneth Raymond; Farm Management Foundation of Australia (1982), Growing trees on Western Australian wheatbelt farms, Farm Management Foundation of Australia, ISBN 978-0-909417-11-6
