= Prostanthera florifera =

Gawler Ranges mintbush

Scientific classification
- Kingdom: Plantae
- Clade: Tracheophytes
- Clade: Angiosperms
- Clade: Eudicots
- Clade: Asterids
- Order: Lamiales
- Family: Lamiaceae
- Genus: Prostanthera
- Species: P. florifera

Binomial name
- Prostanthera florifera B.J.Conn
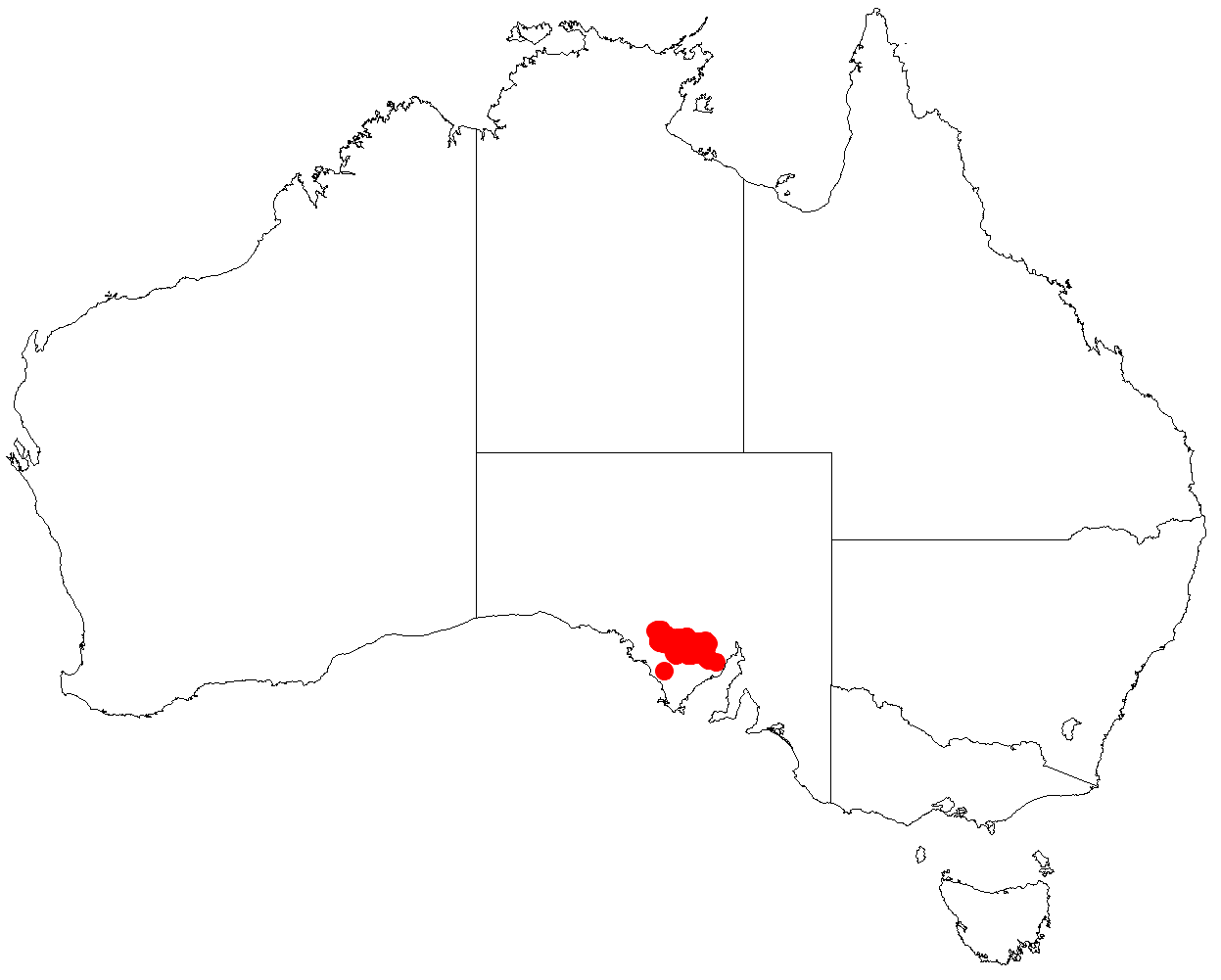
- Occurrence data from AVH

Species of plant

Prostanthera florifera, commonly known as Gawler Ranges mintbush, is a species of flowering plant in the family Lamiaceae and is endemic to the Eyre Peninsula in South Australia. It is a small shrub with densely hairy branches, thick, linear to narrow oblong leaves, and pinkish-red flowers that are pale pink with pinkish-red blotches inside the petal tube.

== Description ==
Prostanthera florifera is a more or less densely-branched shrub that typically grows to a height of 0.3–1 m (1 ft 0 in – 3 ft 3 in) high with densely hairy branches. The leaves are thick, linear to narrow oblong 4–10 mm (0.16–0.39 in) long and 0.5–1 mm (0.020–0.039 in) wide and sessile. The flowers are arranged near the ends of branchlets, each flower on a pedicel 3–4 mm (0.12–0.16 in) long. The sepals are 7–12 mm (0.28–0.47 in) long and form a tube 5–7 mm (0.20–0.28 in) long with two lobes 2–5 mm (0.079–0.197 in) long. The petals are pinkish-red, 20–26 mm (0.79–1.02 in) long and form a tube 12–15 mm (0.47–0.59 in) long that is pink with white and pinkish-red blotches inside and brownish blotches on the lobes. The lower lip of the petal tube has three lobes, the centre lobe spatula-shaped, about 5 mm (0.20 in) long and 2.5–3 mm (0.098–0.118 in) wide and the side lobes 3–4 mm (0.12–0.16 in) long and 2–3 mm (0.079–0.118 in) wide. The upper lip is egg-shaped, 7–9 mm (0.28–0.35 in) long and 8–9 mm (0.31–0.35 in) wide. Flowering occurs from August to October.

== Taxonomy ==
Prostanthera florifera was first formally described in 1984 by Barry Conn in the Journal of the Adelaide Botanic Gardens from specimens collected on Miccollo Hill in the Gawler Ranges in the northern Eyre Peninsula in 1979.

== Distribution and habitat ==
Gawler Ranges mintbush grows amongst in rocky places with scattered shrubs in the Eyre Peninsula of South Australia.
