= Prostanthera nanophylla =

Conservation status
- Priority Three — Poorly Known Taxa (DEC)

Scientific classification
- Kingdom: Plantae
- Clade: Tracheophytes
- Clade: Angiosperms
- Clade: Eudicots
- Clade: Asterids
- Order: Lamiales
- Family: Lamiaceae
- Genus: Prostanthera
- Species: P. nanophylla

Binomial name
- Prostanthera nanophylla B.J.Conn
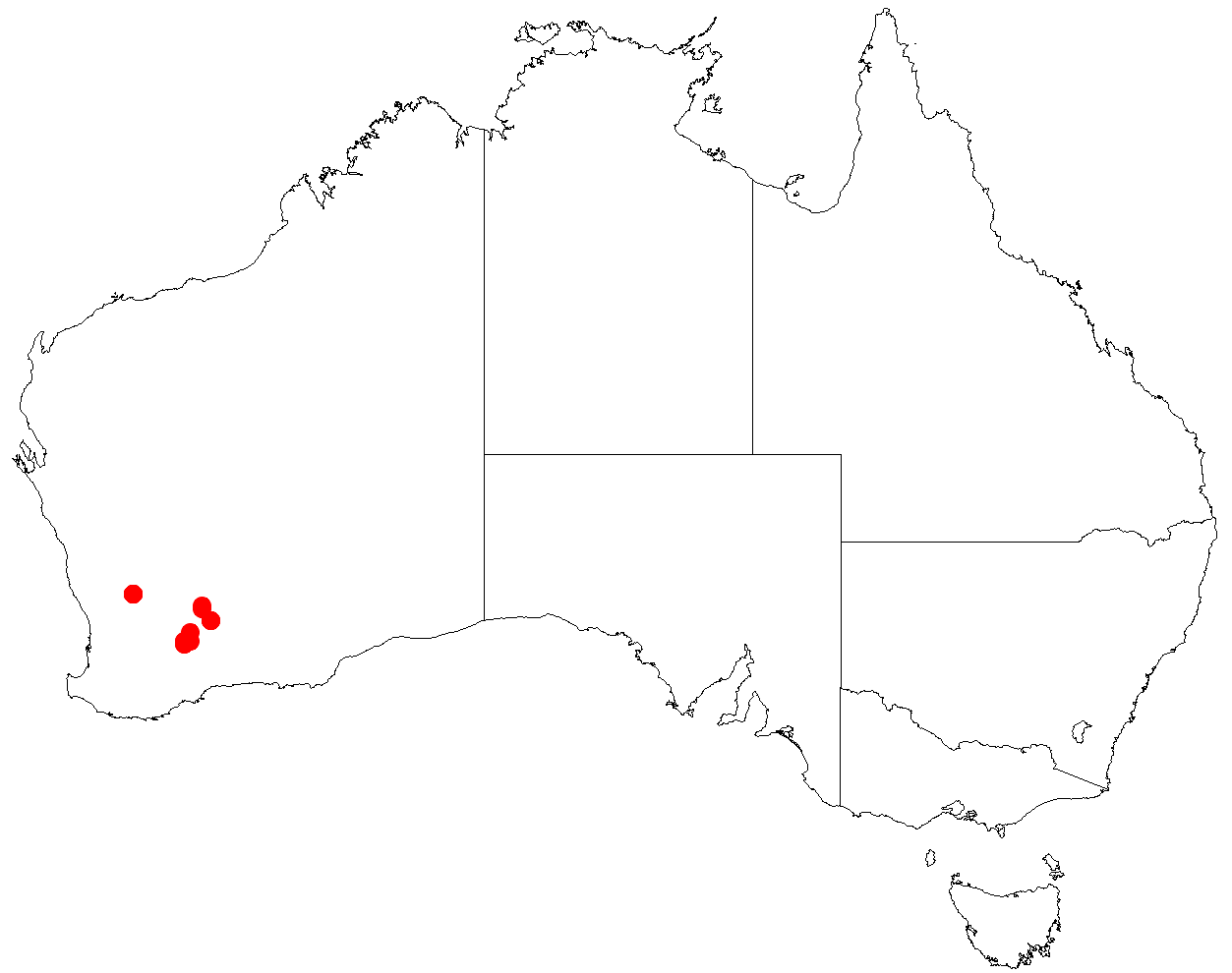
- Occurrence data from AVH

Species of flowering plant

Prostanthera nanophylla is a species of flowering plant in the family Lamiaceae and is endemic to Western Australia. It is a small shrub with hairy branches, egg-shaped to elliptic or narrow oblong leaves and mauve or blue to white flowers with dull brown, maroon or purple spots.

== Description ==
Prostanthera nanophylla is a shrub that typically grows to a height of 0.1–1 m (3.9 in – 3 ft 3.4 in) and has hairy, glandular branches. The leaves are usually clustered towards the ends of the shorter branchlets and are egg-shaped to elliptic or narrow oblong, 1.5–4.5 mm (0.059–0.177 in) long, about 1–1.5 mm (0.039–0.059 in) wide and sessile. The flowers are arranged in groups of six to ten near the ends of branchlets, each flower on a hairy pedicel 1.5 mm (0.059 in) long. The sepals are green to maroon, and form a tube 1.5–2.5 mm (0.059–0.098 in) long with two lobes, the lower lobe 3–4 mm (0.12–0.16 in) long and the upper lobe 3–5 mm (0.12–0.20 in) long. The petals are mauve or blue to white with dull brown, maroon or purple spots, 8–14 mm (0.31–0.55 in) long and form a tube 7.5–10 mm (0.30–0.39 in) long. The lower lip of the petal tube has three lobes, the centre lobe egg-shaped, 6–7 mm (0.24–0.28 in) long and the side lobes 2.5–4.5 mm (0.098–0.177 in) long. The upper lip is about 3 mm (0.12 in) long and 6–8 mm (0.24–0.31 in) wide with a central notch up to 2 mm (0.079 in) deep. Flowering occurs from August to November.

== Taxonomy ==
Prostanthera nanophylla was first formally described in 1988 by Barry Conn in the journal Nuytsia from specimens collected in 1975 near Koorda by Joseph Zvonko Weber (1930-1996).

== Distribution and habitat ==
This mintbush grows in rocky places and on sandplains and has been collected in the Avon Wheatbelt, Coolgardie and Mallee biogeographic regions.

== Conservation status ==
Prostanthera nanophylla is classified as "Priority Three" by the Government of Western Australia Department of Parks and Wildlife meaning that it is poorly known and known from only a few locations but is not under imminent threat.
