= Muniria megalophylla =

Scientific classification
- Kingdom: Plantae
- Clade: Tracheophytes
- Clade: Angiosperms
- Clade: Eudicots
- Clade: Asterids
- Order: Lamiales
- Family: Lamiaceae
- Genus: Muniria
- Species: M. megalophylla

Binomial name
- Muniria megalophylla (Munir) N.Streiber & B.J.Conn

Species of shrub

Muniria megalophylla is a flowering plant in the mint family Lamiaceae and is endemic to Arnhem Land in the Northern Territory. It is a shrub with its branches and leaves densely covered with a layer of short, greyish, branched hairs and small groups of reddish-pink flowers near the ends of the branches.

== Description ==
Muniria megalophylla is shrub which grows to a height of 1–2 m (3–7 ft) and has branches that have four corners in cross-section. The branches, leaves and some of the flower parts are densely covered with woolly, greyish, branched hairs. The leaves have a thin stalk 1–2 cm (0.4–0.8 in) long and an egg-shaped blade 5–10 cm (2–4 in) long and 3–5 cm (1–2 in) wide which is heart-shaped at its base. The upper surface of the leaves is wrinkled and the lower surface has a distinct network of veins.

The flowers are arranged singly or more usually in groups of up to three to seven in leaf axils near the ends of the branches, each flower on a woolly stalk 2–3 mm (0.08–0.1 in) long. The flowers are surrounded by leaf-like bracts and bracteoles. The five sepals are 22 mm (0.9 in) long, joined to form a tube for about half their length, hairy on the outside and on the inside of the lobes but glabrous inside the tube. The petals are reddish-pink, 22–27 mm (0.9–1 in) long and joined to form a tube 18–22 mm (0.7–0.9 in) long. The tube is densely woolly on the outside but mostly glabrous inside except for a narrow ring of hairs around the ovary and a few hairs on the largest petal lobe. There are five lobes on the end of the tube, the lower, central lobe is roughly circular, 4–5 mm (0.16–0.20 in) long and 5–7 mm (0.2–0.3 in) wide at the base and larger than the other lobes which are a similar size and shape to each other. The four stamens reach past the end of the tube, the lower pair longer than the upper ones. Flowering occurs in June and is followed by fruit which is oblong but with four distinct ridges and hairy at one end and 4–6 mm (0.16–0.24 in) long.

== Taxonomy and naming ==
This species was first formally described in 1979 by Ahmad Abid Munir from a specimen collected near Yaimanyi Creek in Arnhem Land. It was given the name Pityrodia megalophylla and the description was published in Journal of the Adelaide Botanic Gardens. In 2011, Barry Conn, Murray Henwood and Nicola Streiber described a new genus, Muniria and transferred this species to it. The specific epithet (megalophylla) is derived from the Ancient Greek words megalo meaning "large" or "great" and phyllon meaning "leaf".

== Distribution ==
This only known location is the type location near Yaimanyi Creek in Arnhem Land.

== Conservation ==
Muniria megalophylla is classified as "data deficient" under the Territory Parks and Wildlife Conservation Act.
