= Prostanthera splendens =

Conservation status
- Priority One — Poorly Known Taxa (DEC)

Scientific classification
- Kingdom: Plantae
- Clade: Tracheophytes
- Clade: Angiosperms
- Clade: Eudicots
- Clade: Asterids
- Order: Lamiales
- Family: Lamiaceae
- Genus: Prostanthera
- Species: P. splendens

Binomial name
- Prostanthera splendens B.J.Conn
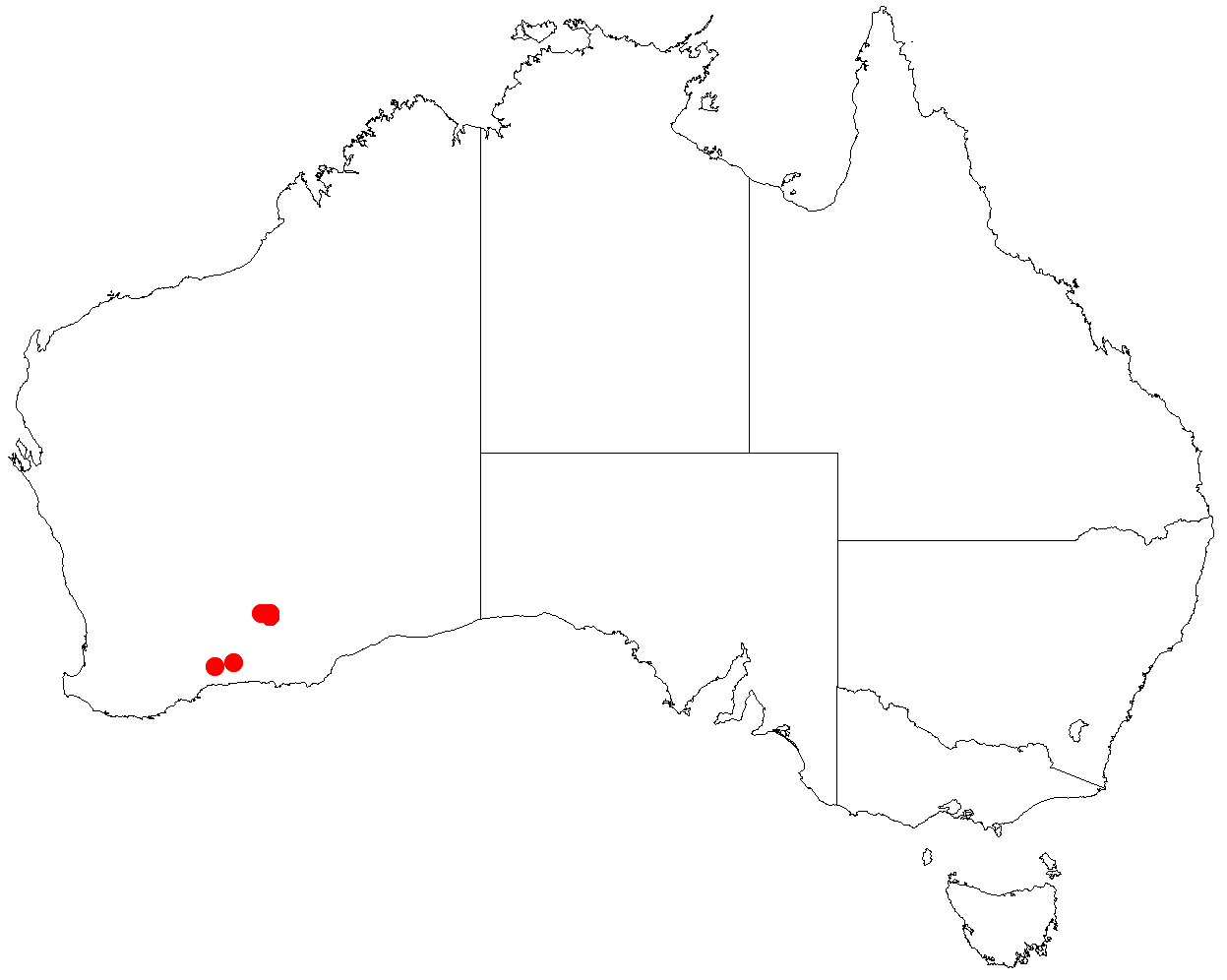
- Occurrence data from AVH

Species of flowering plant

Prostanthera splendens is a species of flowering plant in the family Lamiaceae and is endemic to Western Australia. It is a small, spreading shrub with small, densely glandular, egg-shaped leaves and mauve to light purple flowers, paler on the inside with mauve to reddish-brown dots.

== Description ==
Prostanthera splendens is a shrub that typically grows to a height of 0.4–0.5 m (1 ft 4 in – 1 ft 8 in) and has cylindrical, hairless branches. The leaves are more or less glabrous, egg-shaped to elliptic, 3.5–6 mm (0.14–0.24 in) long, 6–8 mm (0.24–0.31 in) wide and sessile or on a petiole up to 0.6 mm (0.024 in) long. The flowers are borne singly in leaf axils on a pedicel 2–3 mm (0.079–0.118 in) long, the sepals forming a tube 4.5–5.5 mm (0.18–0.22 in) long with two lobes, the upper lobe 3.6–4 mm (0.14–0.16 in) long and about 6.5 mm (0.26 in) wide. The petals are mauve to light purple but paler on the inside of the tube, with mauve to reddish-brown dots, 10–15 mm (0.39–0.59 in) long and form a tube 8.5–10 mm (0.33–0.39 in) long. The lower lip of the petal tube has three lobes, the centre lobe spatula-shaped to egg-shaped, 4–5.6 mm (0.16–0.22 in) long and the side lobes 3.3–4.9 mm (0.13–0.19 in) long. The upper lip is 4.2–6.5 mm (0.17–0.26 in) long with a central notch 2–3.5 mm (0.079–0.138 in) deep.

== Taxonomy ==
Prostanthera splendens was first formally described in 1988 by Barry Conn in the journal Nuytsia from specimens collected by Charles Gardner near Mount Barloweerie in 1931.

== Distribution and habitat ==
This mintbush grows in pebbly soil on breakaways in the Coolgardie and Mallee biogeographic regions of Western Australia.

== Conservation status ==
Prostanthera splendens is classified as "Priority One" by the Government of Western Australia Department of Parks and Wildlife, meaning that it is known from only one or a few locations which are potentially at risk.
