= Prostanthera athertoniana =

Scientific classification
- Kingdom: Plantae
- Clade: Tracheophytes
- Clade: Angiosperms
- Clade: Eudicots
- Clade: Asterids
- Order: Lamiales
- Family: Lamiaceae
- Genus: Prostanthera
- Species: P. athertoniana

Binomial name
- Prostanthera athertoniana B.J.Conn & T.C.Wilson

Species of flowering plant

Prostanthera athertoniana is a species of flowering plant in the family Lamiaceae and is endemic to a restricted area of Queensland. It is a small, densely-foliaged shrub with strongly aromatic, elliptical, oblong or egg-shaped leaves and hairy, purplish-mauve flowers arranged singly in upper leaf axils.

== Description ==
Prostanthera athertoniana is a densely-foliaged shrub that typically grows to a height of about 1 m (3 ft 3 in) with hairy, cylindrical stems. The leaves are aromatic, densely hairy, dull green, paler on the lower surface; elliptical oblong or egg-shaped, 15–20 mm (0.59–0.79 in) long and 6–8 mm (0.24–0.31 in) wide on a petiole 0.5–1 mm (0.020–0.039 in) long. The flowers are arranged singly in two to four leaf axils near the ends of branchlets, each flower on a pedicel 3–4.5 mm (0.12–0.18 in) long. The sepals are green and purple, densely covered on the outside with white hairs, and form a tube about 2.5 mm (0.098 in) long with two lobes, the lower lobe 5 mm (0.20 in) long 4 mm (0.16 in) wide and the upper lobe 3–3.5 mm (0.12–0.14 in) long and 4.5–5 mm (0.18–0.20 in) wide. The petals are 10–12 mm (0.39–0.47 in) long, purplish mauve and hairy. The lower lip has three lobes, the centre lobe about 5 mm (0.20 in) long and wide, the side lobes 5.5–6 mm (0.22–0.24 in) long and 4–5 mm (0.16–0.20 in) wide. The upper lip has two lobes 3–3.5 mm (0.12–0.14 in) long and 8–8.5 mm (0.31–0.33 in) wide.

== Taxonomy ==
Prostanthera athertoniana was first formally described in 2015 by Barry Conn and Trevor Wilson in the journal Telopea from specimens collected on Kahlpahlim Rock in what is now known as Dinden National Park.

== Distribution and habitat ==
This mintbush is only known from the type location on Kahlpahlim Rock where it grows in windswept heath.

== Conservation status ==
Prostanthera athertoniana is classified as of "least concern" under the Queensland Government Nature Conservation Act 1992.
