= Prostanthera centralis =

Conservation status
- Priority Three — Poorly Known Taxa (DEC)

Scientific classification
- Kingdom: Plantae
- Clade: Tracheophytes
- Clade: Angiosperms
- Clade: Eudicots
- Clade: Asterids
- Order: Lamiales
- Family: Lamiaceae
- Genus: Prostanthera
- Species: P. centralis

Binomial name
- Prostanthera centralis B.J.Conn
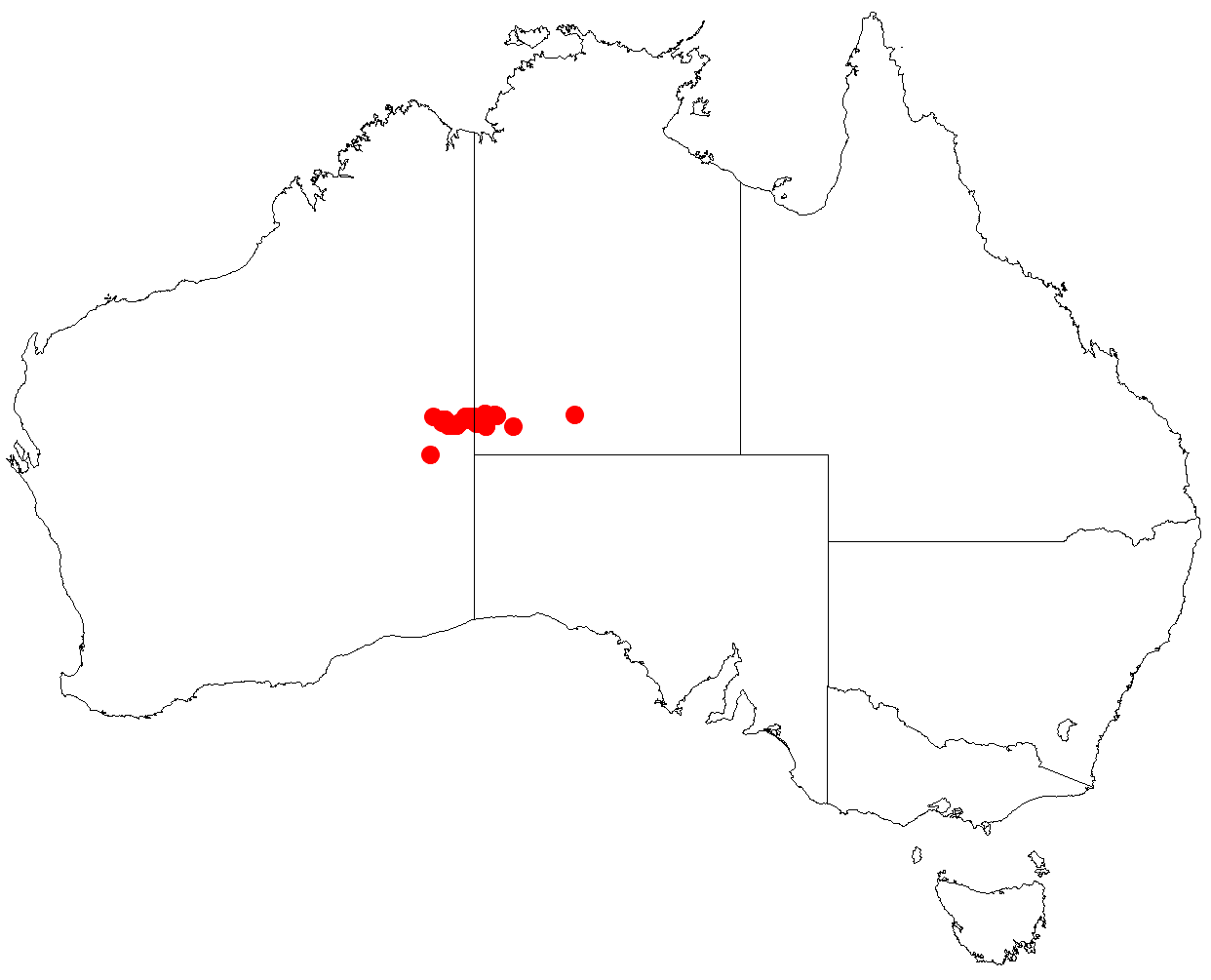
- Occurrence data from AVH

Species of plant

Prostanthera centralis is a species of flowering plant in the family Lamiaceae and is endemic to an area near the border between the Northern Territory and Western Australia. It is an erect shrub with hairy branchlets, hairy egg-shaped to elliptical leaves and mauve to blue flowers.

== Description ==
Prostanthera centralis is an erect shrub that typically grows to a height of 0.3–1 m (1 ft 0 in – 3 ft 3 in) and has more or less cylindrical, densely hairy branchlets. The leaves are densely hairy, egg-shaped to elliptical, 9–20 mm (0.35–0.79 in) long, 4–9 mm (0.16–0.35 in) wide on a petiole 0.5–1.5 mm (0.020–0.059 in) long. The flowers are arranged singly in 16 to 46 leaf axils on the ends of branchlets, each flower on a densely hairy pedicel 1.5–3.5 mm (0.059–0.138 in) long. The sepals are green with a purplish tip and form a tube 2.5–5 mm (0.098–0.197 in) long with two lobes, the lower lobe 3–6 mm (0.12–0.24 in) long and 4–7 mm (0.16–0.28 in) wide, the upper lobe 3.5–5 mm (0.14–0.20 in) long and 6–8 mm (0.24–0.31 in) wide. The petals are purplish blue, or mauve to blue, 11–16 mm (0.43–0.63 in) long and form a tube 8–10.5 mm (0.31–0.41 in) long. The lower lip has three lobes, the centre lobe egg-shaped to almost round, 3–5 mm (0.12–0.20 in) long and 5–6 mm (0.20–0.24 in) wide and the side lobes about 4 mm (0.16 in) long and 3 mm (0.12 in) wide. The upper lip has two egg-shaped lobes 3.5–4 mm (0.14–0.16 in) long and 6–8 mm (0.24–0.31 in) wide. Flowering occurs from July to October.

== Taxonomy ==
Prostanthera centralis was first formally described in 1988 by Barry Conn in the journal Nuytsia from specimens collected in the Dean Range, near the Kaltukatjara settlement.

== Distribution and habitat ==
This mintbush grows on rocky scree slopes in the Central Ranges bioregion near the border between the Northern Territory and Western Australia.

== Conservation status ==
Prostanthera centralis is classified as "Priority Three" by the Government of Western Australia Department of Parks and Wildlife meaning that it is poorly known and known from only a few locations but is not under imminent threat.
