= Muniria angustisepala =

Scientific classification
- Kingdom: Plantae
- Clade: Tracheophytes
- Clade: Angiosperms
- Clade: Eudicots
- Clade: Asterids
- Order: Lamiales
- Family: Lamiaceae
- Genus: Muniria
- Species: M. angustisepala

Binomial name
- Muniria angustisepala (Munir) N.Streiber & B.J.Conn

Species of shrub

Muniria angustisepala is a flowering plant in the mint family Lamiaceae and is endemic to the Northern Territory. It is an erect shrub with softly hairy, warty leaves and pale yellow, woolly flowers.

== Description ==
Muniria angustisepala is shrub which grows to a height of about 2 m (7 ft) and has branches that have four corners in cross-section and are densely hairy. The leaves are elliptic to lance-shaped, 3–7 cm (1–3 in) long, 1–2 cm (0.4–0.8 in) wide, softly hairy, have a wrinkled, blistered upper surface. The leaf stalk is a further 4–10 mm (0.2–0.4 in) long.

The flowers are solitary in groups of up to three in leaf axils on a short, sticky, hairy stalk. There are sticky, hairy bracts and bracteoles at the base of the flower. The five sepals are 13–18 mm (0.5–0.7 in) long and joined at their bases to form a short tube. The sepals are linear to narrow lance-shaped, sticky and hairy and ribbed on the outside. The petals are pale yellow, 18–25 mm (0.7–1 in) long and joined to form a tube 13–16 mm (0.5–0.6 in) long, sticky and slightly hairy on the outside but glabrous on the inside except for a dense ring of hairs around the ovary and a few hairs on the largest petal lobe. The petal lobes are broad egg-shaped and about 2.5–5 mm (0.1–0.2 in) long with the middle lower lobe the largest. The four stamens extend beyond the end of the tube, the lower pair longer than the upper ones. Flowering occurs from January to September and is followed by fruit which is oblong but with four distinct ridges and has the sepals attached.

== Taxonomy and naming ==
This species was first formally described in 1979 by Ahmad Abid Munir from a specimen collected near the UDP Falls (now Gunlom Falls). It was given the name Pityrodia angustisepala and the description was published in Journal of the Adelaide Botanic Gardens. In 2011, Barry Conn, Murray Henwood and Nicola Streiber described a new genus, Muniria and transferred this species to it. The specific epithet (angustisepala) is derived from the Latin word angustus meaning "narrow" and the Neo-Latin sepalum meaning "sepal".

== Distribution ==
This species only occurs in northern parts of the Northern Territory, including in Kakadu, Limmen, and Nitmiluk National Parks in the Arnhem Plateau, Darwin Coastal, Gulf Coastal, Gulf Fall and Uplands and Pine Creek biogeographic regions.

== Conservation ==
Muniria angustisepala is classified as "least concern" under the Territory Parks and Wildlife Conservation Act.
