= Prostanthera eungella =

Scientific classification
- Kingdom: Plantae
- Clade: Tracheophytes
- Clade: Angiosperms
- Clade: Eudicots
- Clade: Asterids
- Order: Lamiales
- Family: Lamiaceae
- Genus: Prostanthera
- Species: P. eungella

Binomial name
- Prostanthera eungella B.J.Conn & K.M.Proft
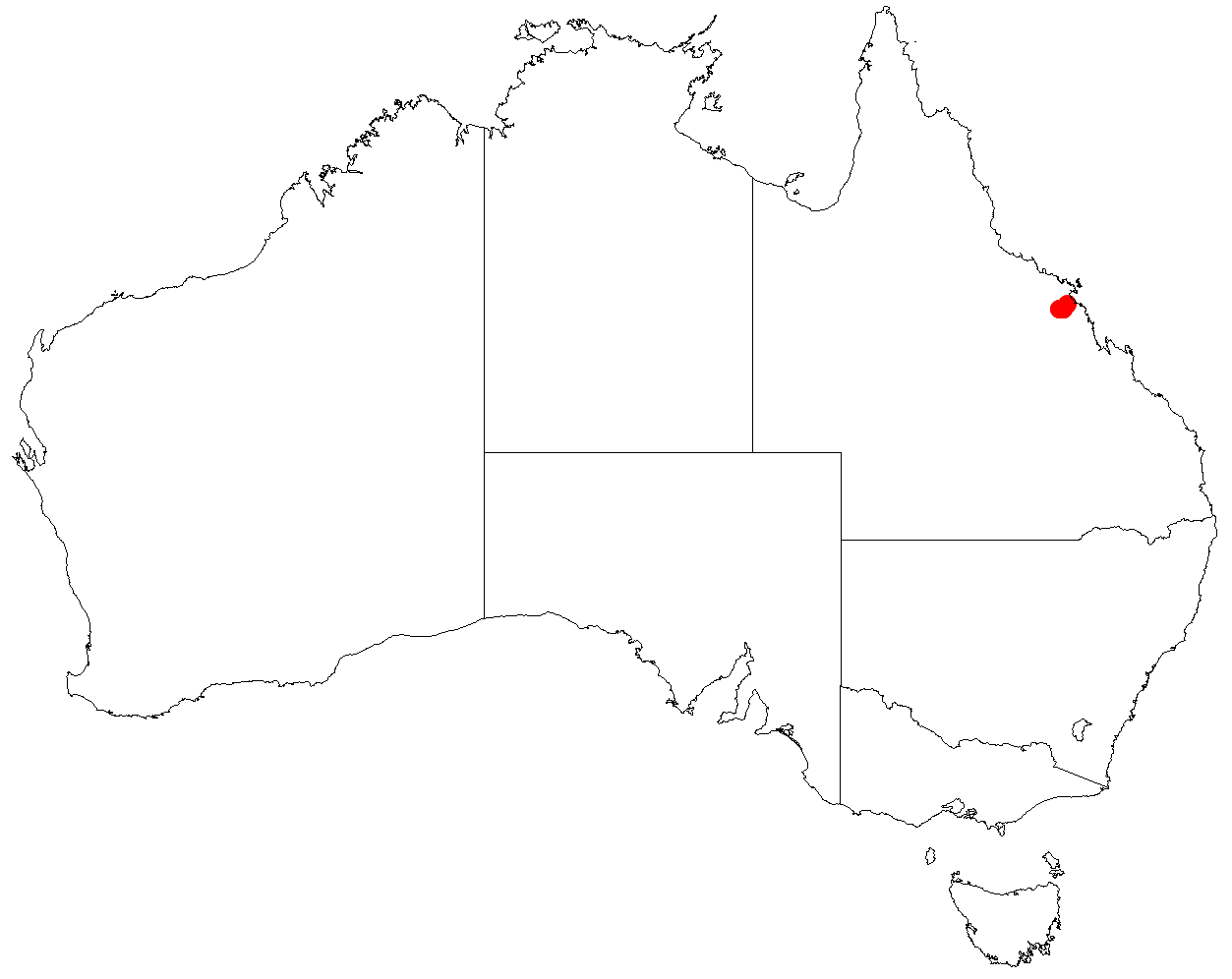
- Occurrence data from AVH

Species of flowering plant

Prostanthera eungella is a species of flowering plant in the family Lamiaceae and is endemic to the Eungella region in Queensland. It is an erect shrub with narrow egg-shaped leaves with small teeth, and mauve flowers that are white inside the petal tube and arranged in upper leaf axils.

== Description ==
Prostanthera eungella is an erect shrub that typically grows to a height of about 1 m (3 ft 3 in) with hairy, glandular stems. The leaves are dark green, paler on the lower surface, narrow egg-shaped, 40–45 mm (1.6–1.8 in) long and 10.5–11.5 mm (0.41–0.45 in) wide on a petiole about 4 mm (0.16 in) long. There are up to six teeth up to 0.5 mm (0.020 in) long on the sides of the leaves. The flowers are arranged singly or in pairs in six to twenty leaf axils near the ends of branchlets, each flower on a pedicel 2–4 mm (0.079–0.157 in) long. The sepals are green, densely glandular and form a tube 2.5–3 mm (0.098–0.118 in) long with two lobes, the lower lobe 2–2.5 mm (0.079–0.098 in) long 4 mm (0.16 in) wide and the upper lobe about 2 mm (0.079 in) long. The petals are 10–12 mm (0.39–0.47 in) long, mauve and white inside the petal tube. The lower lip has three lobes, the centre lobe broadly spatula-shaped, 6–8 mm (0.24–0.31 in) long and about 7 mm (0.28 in) wide, the side lobes about 4.5 mm (0.18 in) long and 2.5 mm (0.098 in) wide. The upper lip is 4.5 mm (0.18 in) long and about 7.5 mm (0.30 in) wide with a central notch 1–1.5 mm (0.039–0.059 in) deep. Flowering has been recorded in May and December.

== Taxonomy ==
Prostanthera eungella was first formally described in 2016 by Barry Conn and Kirstin M. Proft in the journal Telopea from specimens collected north-west of Eungella township.

== Distribution and habitat ==
This mintbush is only known from near the type location where it grows in open forest and on the edge of rainforest.

== Conservation status ==
Prostanthera eungella is classified as of "least concern" under the Queensland Government Nature Conservation Act 1992.
