= Prostanthera mulliganensis =

Mount Mulligan prostanthera

Conservation status
- Critically Endangered (NCA)

Scientific classification
- Kingdom: Plantae
- Clade: Tracheophytes
- Clade: Angiosperms
- Clade: Eudicots
- Clade: Asterids
- Order: Lamiales
- Family: Lamiaceae
- Genus: Prostanthera
- Species: P. mulliganensis

Binomial name
- Prostanthera mulliganensis B.J.Conn & T.C.Wilson
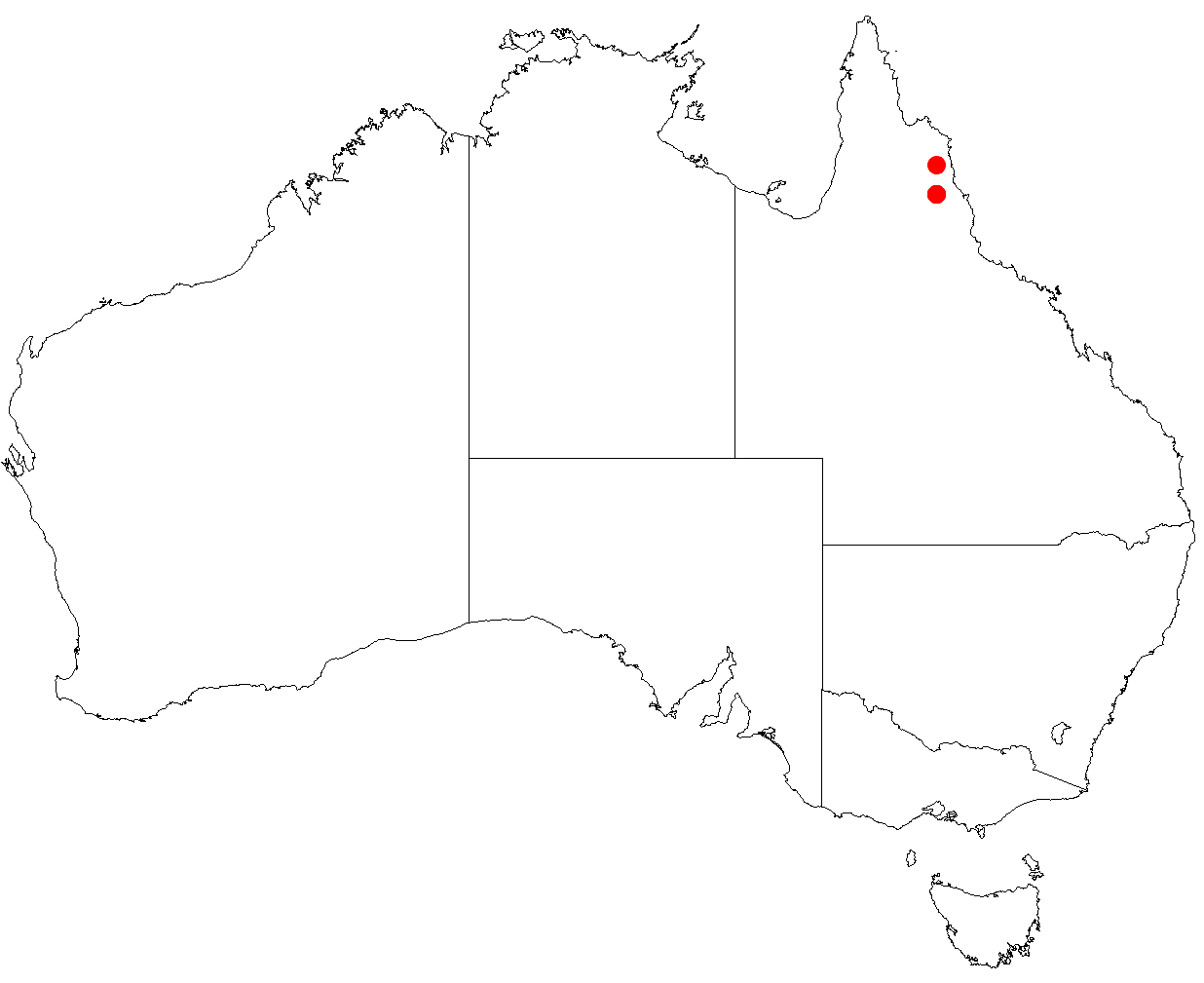
- Occurrence data from AVH

Species of flowering plant

Prostanthera mulliganensis, commonly known as Mount Mulligan prostanthera, is a species of flowering plant that is endemic to Mount Mulligan in Queensland. It is a small shrub with hairy branchlets, oblong to egg-shaped leaves and mauve flowers with purple to dark mauve markings.

== Description ==
Prostanthera mulliganensis is a shrub that typically grows to a height of 1–1.5 m (3 ft 3 in – 4 ft 11 in) with hairy branches. The leaves are dull green, oblong to egg-shaped with the narrower end towards the base, 15–20 mm (0.59–0.79 in) long and 3–4 mm (0.12–0.16 in) wide on a petiole 4–5 mm (0.16–0.20 in) long. The flowers are arranged in groups of two to four near the ends of branchlets, each flower on a stalk 3–3.5 mm (0.12–0.14 in) long. The sepals are green, densely hairy and form a tube 2.5–3 mm (0.098–0.118 in) long with two lobes, the upper lobe 6–7 mm (0.24–0.28 in) long and the lower lobe 2.5–3 mm (0.098–0.118 in) long. The petals are mauve with purple to dark mauve markings and 12–15 mm (0.47–0.59 in) long, forming a tube 8.5–10 mm (0.33–0.39 in) long with two lips. The central lower lobe is 6–7.5 mm (0.24–0.30 in) long and the side lobes are about 4.5 mm (0.18 in) long. The upper lip is broadly oblong, 4–5 mm (0.16–0.20 in) long and 4.5–6 mm (0.18–0.24 in) wide with a small central notch.

== Taxonomy ==
Prostanthera mulliganensis was first formally described in 2015 by Barry Conn and Trevor Wilson in the journal Telopea, based on plant material collected on the summit of Mount Mulligan.

== Distribution and habitat ==
Mount Mulligan prostanthera is only known from Mount Mulligan where it grows in soil derived from sandstone and on sheer cliff faces.

== Conservation status ==
This mintbush is classified as "critically endangered" under the Queensland Government Nature Conservation Act 1992.
