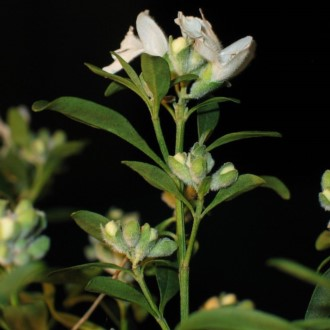
- In Bungonia National Park

Scientific classification
- Kingdom: Plantae
- Clade: Tracheophytes
- Clade: Angiosperms
- Clade: Eudicots
- Clade: Asterids
- Order: Lamiales
- Family: Lamiaceae
- Genus: Prostanthera
- Species: P. conniana

Binomial name
- Prostanthera conniana T.C.Wilson
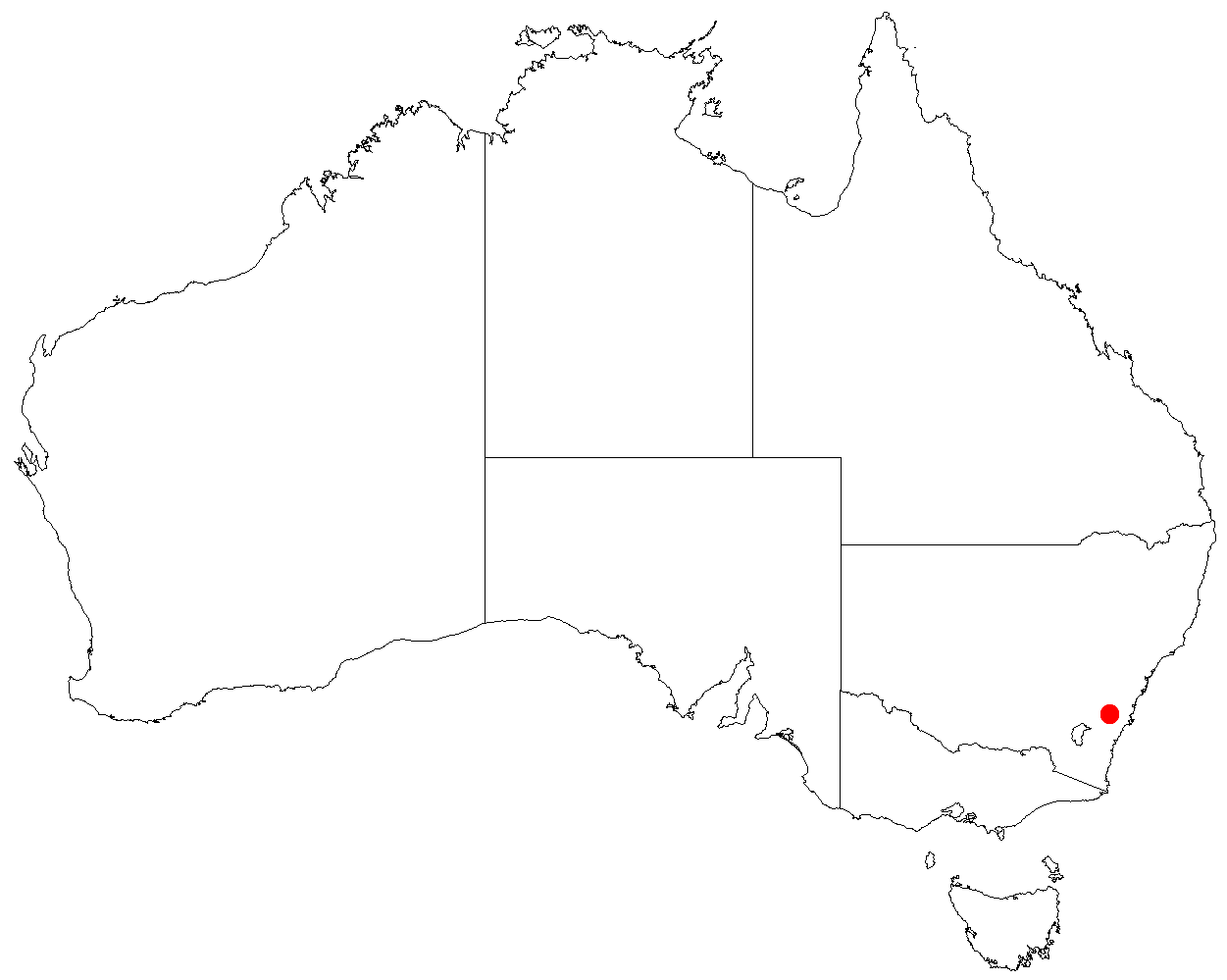
- Occurrence data from AVH

= Prostanthera conniana =

Species of flowering plant

Prostanthera conniana is a species of flowering plant that is endemic to New South Wales. It is an erect, open shrub with branchlets that are square in cross-section, narrow egg-shaped to narrow oblong leaves, and white flowers with bright yellow markings on the throat, the flowers arranged in groups of four to eight.

== Description ==
Prostanthera conniana is an erect, open shrub that typically grows to a height of 1.5–3.5 m (4 ft 11 in – 11 ft 6 in) with four-sided branchlets. Its leaves are narrow egg-shaped to narrow oblong, 16–24 mm (0.63–0.94 in) long and 3.5–6.5 mm (0.14–0.26 in) wide on a petiole 1.5–3.5 mm (0.059–0.138 in) long, and with glands on both sides. The flowers are arranged in groups of four to eight, the sepals green, sometimes with a maroon tinge. The petals are 11–16 mm (0.43–0.63 in) long and white, sometimes with a pale mauve tinge and there are bright yellow marking on the throat of the petal tube. Flowering occurs from November to December.

== Taxonomy and naming ==
Prostanthera conniana was first formally described in 2015 by Trevor C. Wilson and others in the journal Telopea. The specific epithet (conniana) honours Barry Conn and his wife Helen.

== Distribution and habitat ==
This mint bush grows on steep rocky slopes in low, open scrub or woodland in four sites near the Shoalhaven River in Bungonia National Park.
