= Prostanthera makinsonii =

Scientific classification
- Kingdom: Plantae
- Clade: Tracheophytes
- Clade: Angiosperms
- Clade: Eudicots
- Clade: Asterids
- Order: Lamiales
- Family: Lamiaceae
- Genus: Prostanthera
- Species: P. makinsonii

Binomial name
- Prostanthera makinsonii B.J.Conn & T.C.Wilson
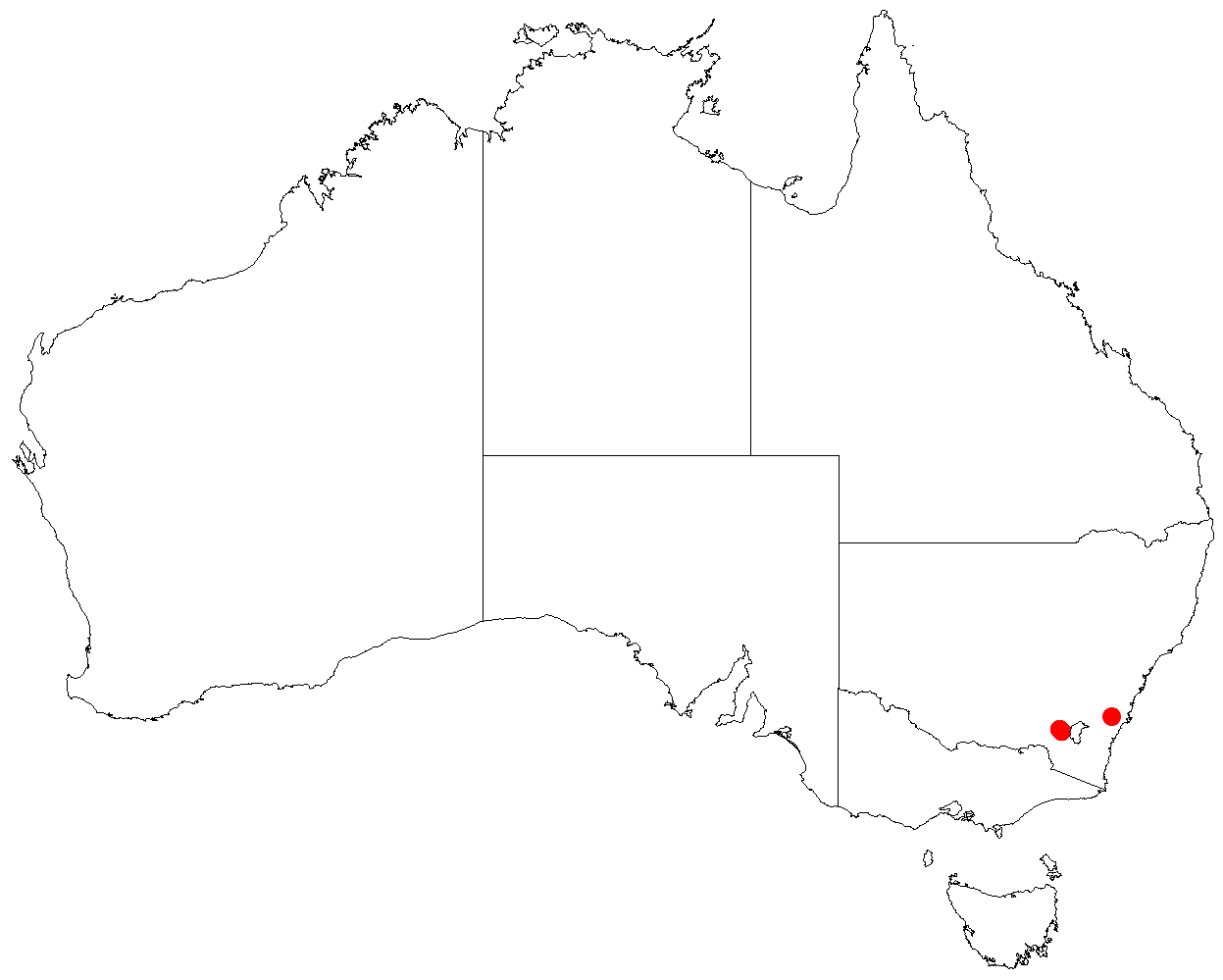
- Occurrence data from AVH

Species of flowering plant

Prostanthera makinsonii is a species of flowering plant in the family Lamiaceae and is endemic to a restricted area of New South Wales. It is a spreading shrub with strongly aromatic, egg-shaped leaves and mostly glabrous purple flowers arranged in bunches of eight to twelve in upper leaf axils.

== Description ==
Prostanthera makinsonii is a spreading shrub that grows to a height of up to 2 m (6 ft 7 in) and has more or less cylindrical, glandular, hairy branches. The leaves are strongly aromatic, hairy and glandular, paler on the lower surface, egg-shaped, 15–20 mm (0.59–0.79 in) long and 6–10 mm (0.24–0.39 in) wide on a petiole 1.5–2 mm (0.059–0.079 in) long. The flowers are arranged in bunches of eight to twelve on the ends of branches, each flower on a pedicel 1.5–2 mm (0.059–0.079 in) long. The sepals are green, sometimes with a maroon tinge, and form a tube 2–2.5 mm (0.079–0.098 in) long with two broadly egg-shaped lobes, 2–3 mm (0.079–0.118 in) long. The petals are purple, 7.5–8 mm (0.30–0.31 in) long forming a tube about 6 mm (0.24 in) long with two lips. The central lobe of the lower lip is about 5 mm (0.20 in) long, the side lobes about 4 mm (0.16 in) long. The upper lip is egg-shaped, 3–3.5 mm (0.12–0.14 in) long and 5.5–6.5 mm (0.22–0.26 in) long with a central notch about 1 mm (0.039 in) deep. Flowering has been observed in November.

== Taxonomy ==
Prostanthera makinsonii was first formally described in 2015 by Barry Conn and Trevor Wilson in the journal Telopea from specimens collected near Dinner Time Creek in Kosciuszko National Park. The specific epithet (makinsonii) honours Robert (Bob) Makinson for his contribution to the conservation of the flora of New South Wales.

== Distribution and habitat ==
This mintbush grows in open Eucalyptus radiata forest, but is only known from the Goobarrangandra Valley on the Southern Tablelands of New South Wales.
