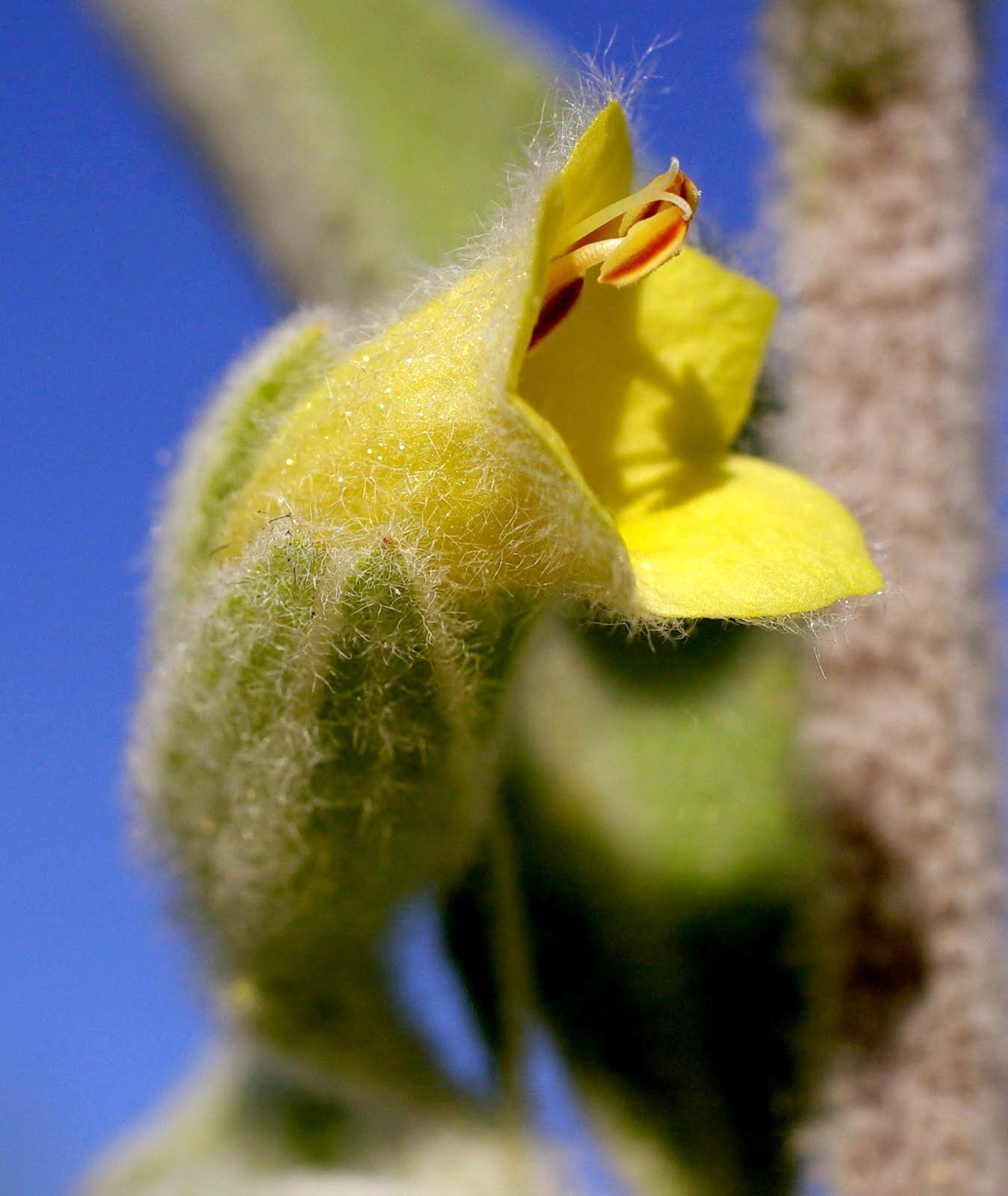
- Flower of Muniria quadrangulata

Scientific classification
- Kingdom: Plantae
- Clade: Tracheophytes
- Clade: Angiosperms
- Clade: Eudicots
- Clade: Asterids
- Order: Lamiales
- Family: Lamiaceae
- Genus: Muniria
- Species: M. quadrangulata

Binomial name
- Muniria quadrangulata (Munir) N.Streiber & B.J.Conn

= Muniria quadrangulata =

Species of shrub

Muniria quadrangulata is a flowering plant in the mint family Lamiaceae and is endemic to Arnhem Land in the Northern Territory. It is a shrub with its branches and leaves covered with a thick layer of woolly hairs and pale yellow flowers in groups of up to nine, surrounded by woolly hairs.

== Description ==
Muniria quadrangulata is shrub which grows to a height of about 1 m (3 ft) and has branches that have four corners in cross-section. The branches, leaves and some of the flower parts are covered with a thick, woolly layer of white hairs. The leaves are oblong to egg-shaped, 4–8 cm (2–3 in) long, 15–25 mm (0.6–1 in) wide and have a wrinkled, blistered surface.

The flowers are arranged in groups of up to nine, sometimes twelve, in leaf axils near the ends of the branches, the groups on a hairy stalk 10–18 mm (0.4–0.7 in) long, each flower on a hairy stalk 2–3 mm (0.08–0.1 in) long. The flowers are surrounded by leafy, lance-shaped, woolly bracts and bracteoles. The five sepals are 10–14 mm (0.4–0.6 in) long, mostly woolly and joined for about half their length into a tube with the sepal lobes 8–11 mm (0.3–0.4 in) long. The petals are pale yellow, 14–25 mm (0.6–1 in) long and joined for most of their length to form a tube which is hairy on the outside but glabrous on the inside except for a narrow ring of hairs around the ovary. There are five egg-shaped lobes on the end of the tube, the lower, central lobe 3–4 mm (0.1–0.2 in) long and 4–6 mm (0.16–0.24 in) wide at the base and much larger than the other lobes which are a similar size and shape to each other. The four stamens reach to near the end of the tube, the lower pair longer than the upper ones. Flowering occurs from January to August and is followed from January to September by the fruit which is oval-shaped but with four distinct ridges and has the sepals attached.

== Taxonomy and naming ==
This species was first formally described in 1979 by Ahmad Abid Munir from a specimen collected south of Gunbalanya (formerly called Oenpelli). It was given the name Pityrodia quadrangulata and the description was published in Journal of the Adelaide Botanic Gardens. In 2011, Barry Conn, Murray Henwood and Nicola Streiber described a new genus, Muniria and transferred this species to it.

== Distribution ==
This species only occurs in Arnhem Land where it is found in Kakadu and Nitmiluk National Parks.

== Conservation ==
Muniria quadrangulata is classified as "least concern" under the Territory Parks and Wildlife Conservation Act.
