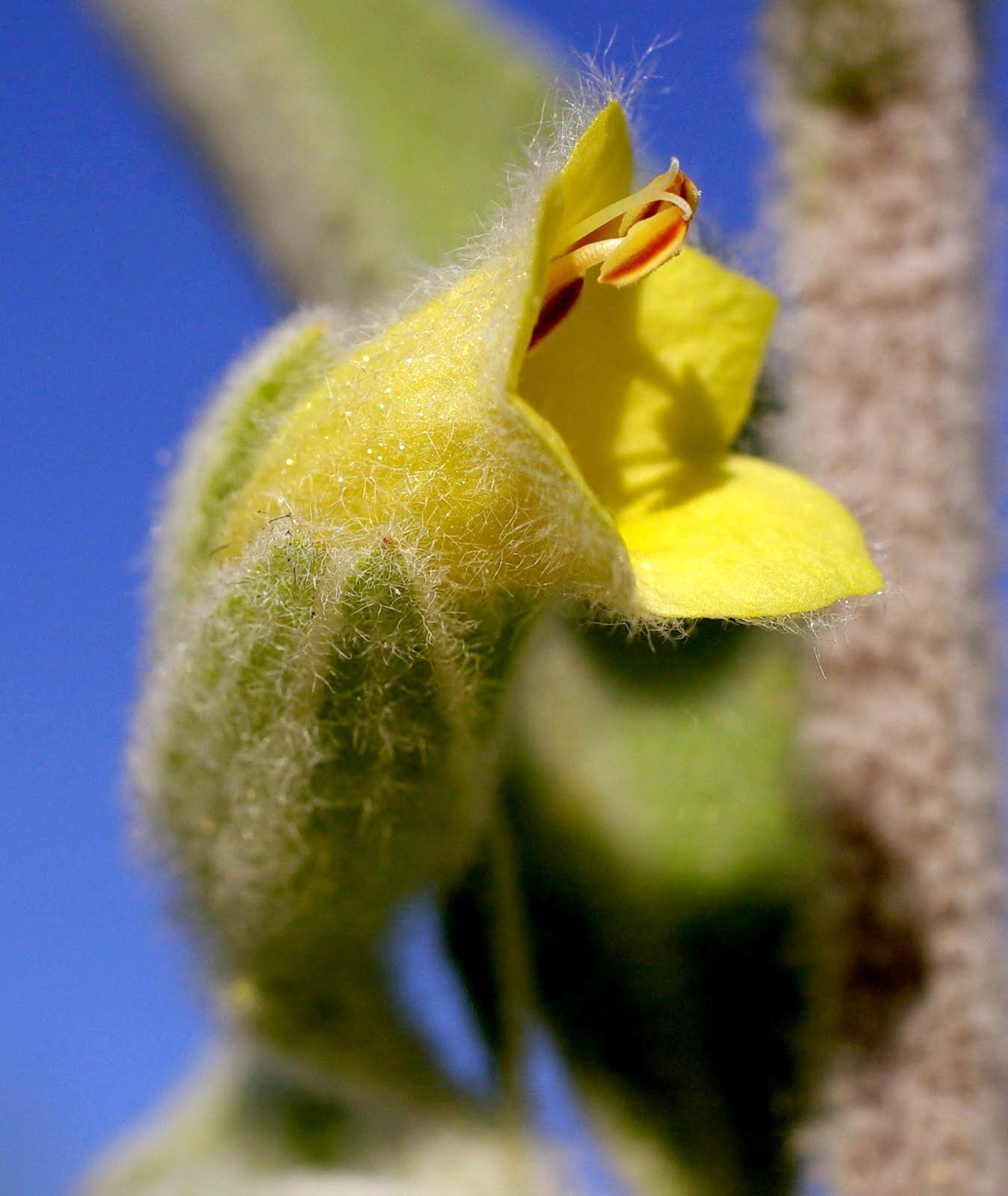
- Flower of Muniria quadrangulata

Scientific classification
- Kingdom: Plantae
- Clade: Tracheophytes
- Clade: Angiosperms
- Clade: Eudicots
- Clade: Asterids
- Order: Lamiales
- Family: Lamiaceae
- Subfamily: Prostantheroideae
- Genus: Muniria; N.Streiber & B.J.Conn

Species
- See text

= Muniria =

Genus of flowering plants

Muniria is a genus of four species of flowering plants in the mint family, Lamiaceae and is endemic to the Northern Territory in Australia. Plants in this genus are woolly shrubs with five petals joined to form a tube-shaped flower with four stamens of unequal lengths. These species are similar to those in the genus Pityrodia except that the branches are distinctly 4-angled in cross section and the fruit has calluses or ridges.

== Description ==
Plants in the genus Muniria are evergreen shrubs, 1–2 m (3–7 ft) tall and densely covered with woolly hairs. The stems and branches are four-angled in cross section. The leaves are simple, elliptic to egg-shaped, arranged in opposite pairs, covered with woolly hairs and glands. The flowers are arranged singly or in groups of up to twelve in leaf axils and single flowers or groups are surrounded by leaf-like bracteoles. Flowers have five sepals which are joined for about half their length to form a tube with five lobes. The five petals are pale yellow to red and form a slightly curved tube with five lobes on the end, the upper lobes slightly shorter than the lower ones. There are four stamens with the lower pair shorter than the upper ones. The fruit is dry, does not release its seeds when mature and has ridges or calluses.

== Taxonomy and naming ==
The genus was first described by Nikola Streiber and Barry Conn in 2011 and the description was published Australian Systematic Botany. The type species is Muniria quadrangulata which was first formally described in 1979 by Ahmad Abid Munir as Pityrodia quadrangulata. In 2011, Barry Conn, Murray Henwood and Nikola Streiber transferred P. quadrangulata and three others in that genus to the new genus Muniria.

Four species of Muniria are accepted by the Australian Plant Census as at March 2020:

- Muniria angustisepala (Munir) N.Streiber & B.J.Conn
- Muniria lanceolata (Munir) N.Streiber & B.J.Conn
- Muniria megalophylla (Munir) N.Streiber & B.J.Conn
- Muniria quadrangulata (Munir) N.Streiber & B.J.Conn

== Distribution ==
All species of Muniria are endemic to the Northern Territory.
