= Ascotolinx funeralis =

Scientific classification
- Kingdom: Animalia
- Phylum: Arthropoda
- Clade: Pancrustacea
- Class: Insecta
- Order: Hymenoptera
- Family: Eulophidae
- Genus: Ascotolinx
- Species: A. funeralis

Binomial name
- Ascotolinx funeralis Girault, 1913

Species of insect

Ascotolinx funeralis is a species of insect from the Eulophidae family. It was described by Girault in 1913, and is a type species.

== Etymology ==
The specific epithet is derived from the Latin root funeralis, which refers to the jet black coloration of the species (due to the association of funerals with the color black).

== Distribution ==
Ascotolinx funeralis has been recorded in the Australo-Papuan regions of Gordonvale, Berrimah, Koah, Stokes Range, Bungonia National Park, Highlands Region, Admiralty Islands, and Baluan Island.
