= Muniria lanceolata =

Scientific classification
- Kingdom: Plantae
- Clade: Tracheophytes
- Clade: Angiosperms
- Clade: Eudicots
- Clade: Asterids
- Order: Lamiales
- Family: Lamiaceae
- Genus: Muniria
- Species: M. lanceolata

Binomial name
- Muniria lanceolata (Munir) N.Streiber & B.J.Conn

Species of shrub

Muniria lanceolata is a flowering plant in the mint family Lamiaceae and is endemic to Arnhem Land in the Northern Territory. It is a shrub with its branches and leaves densely covered with a layer of short, greyish, branched hairs and red flowers near the ends of the branches.

== Description ==
Muniria lanceolata is shrub which grows to a height of 1–2 m (3–7 ft) and has branches that have four corners in cross-section. The branches, leaves and some of the flower parts are densely covered with short greyish, branched hairs. The leaves have a thin stalk 6–10 mm (0.2–0.4 in) long and an elliptic to lance-shaped blade 4–8 mm (0.2–0.3 in) long and 6–20 mm (0.2–0.8 in) wide. The leaves are dark green, and wrinkled on the upper surface.

The flowers are arranged singly or in groups of up to three in leaf axils near the ends of the branches, each flower on a hairy stalk 1–3 mm (0.04–0.1 in) long. The flowers are surrounded by bracts which are similar in size and shape to the leaves and by smaller bracteoles. The five sepals are 10–16 mm (0.4–0.6 in) long, hairy and joined for about half their length into a tube. The petals are red, 20–27 mm (0.8–1 in) long and joined to form a tube 14–22 mm (0.6–0.9 in) long. The tube is densely woolly on the outside but mostly glabrous inside except for a narrow ring of hairs around the ovary and a few hairs on the largest petal lobe. There are five lobes on the end of the tube, the lower, central lobe roughly circular, 4–7 mm (0.2–0.3 in) long and 3–7 mm (0.1–0.3 in) wide at the base and larger than the other lobes which are a similar size and shape to each other. The four stamens reach past the end of the tube, the lower pair longer than the upper ones. Flowering occurs in most months and is followed by fruit which is oval-shaped but with four distinct ridges and hairy at one end.

== Taxonomy and naming ==
This species was first formally described in 1979 by Ahmad Abid Munir from a specimen collected near Oenpelli (present day Gunbalanya). It was given the name Pityrodia lanceolata and the description was published in Journal of the Adelaide Botanic Gardens. In 2011, Barry Conn, Murray Henwood and Nicola Streiber described a new genus, Muniria and transferred this species to it. The specific epithet (lanceolata) is a Latin word meaning "lancelike".

== Distribution ==
This species only occurs in Arnhem Land where it is found in Nitmiluk National Park.

== Conservation ==
Muniria lanceolata is classified as "least concern" under the Territory Parks and Wildlife Conservation Act.
