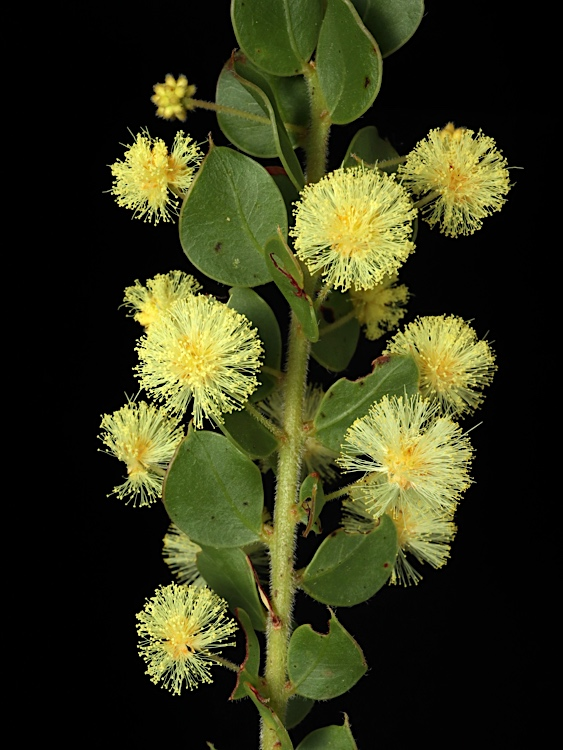

Scientific classification
- Kingdom: Plantae
- Clade: Tracheophytes
- Clade: Angiosperms
- Clade: Eudicots
- Clade: Rosids
- Order: Fabales
- Family: Fabaceae
- Subfamily: Caesalpinioideae
- Clade: Mimosoid clade
- Genus: Acacia
- Species: A. cremiflora

Binomial name
- Acacia cremiflora B.J.Conn & Tame
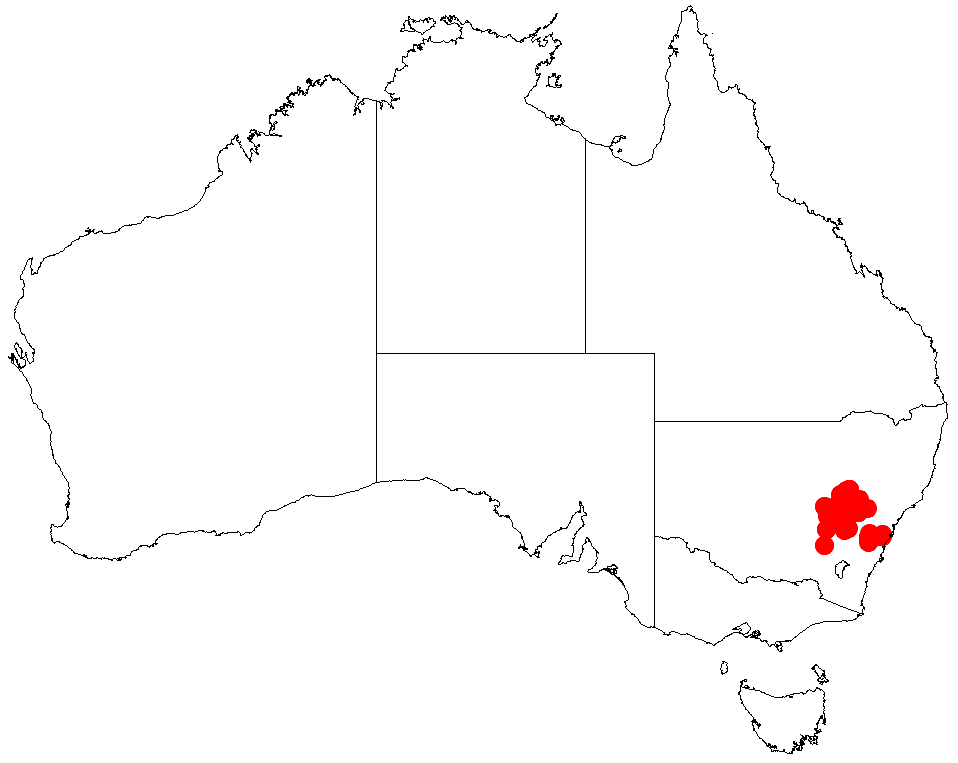
- Occurrence data from AVH

Synonyms
- Racosperma cremiflorum (B.J.Conn & Tame) Pedley

= Acacia cremiflora =

Species of legume

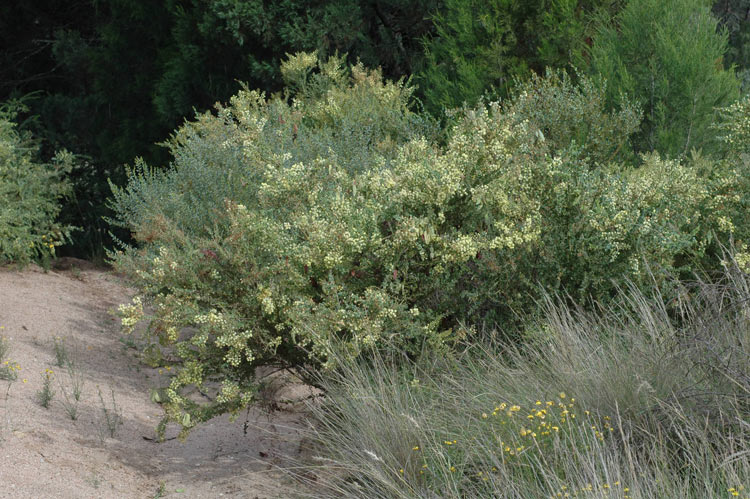
Habit near Molong

Acacia cremiflora is a species of flowering plant in the family Fabaceae and is endemic to New South Wales, Australia. It is usually a bushy shrub with five or six main branches at ground level, elliptic to broadly elliptic, sometimes more or less round phyllodes, in the same plane as the branchlets or rotated from the branchlets, heads of pale yellow to cream-coloured flowers and oblong, thickly leathery, straight or curved pods.

== Description ==
Acacia cremiflora is usually a bushy shrub that typically grows to a height of less than 1 m (3 ft 3 in) but can reach as high as 2 m (6 ft 7 in). It has usually five or six main branches at ground level and sometimes has a few arching branches. The branchlets are ribbed, brown to green, smooth and hairy. The phyllodes are flat or convex, elliptic to broadly elliptic, mostly 9–14 mm (0.35–0.55 in) long, 5–9 mm (0.20–0.35 in) wide and in the same plane as the branchlets or rotated at up to 75° to the branchlets. The phyllodes are dull, light to dark greenish grey or green with a mostly wavy edge. The flowers are pale yellow to cream-coloured and borne in heads 7–8 mm (0.28–0.31 in) in diameter on peduncles 7–16 mm (0.28–0.63 in) long, each head with 18 to 26 flowers. Flowering occurs in most months and the pods are thickly leathery, oblong to broadly oblong, 40–80 mm (1.6–3.1 in) long and 15–20 mm (0.59–0.79 in) wide, dull brown to dark brownish-black.

== Taxonomy ==
Acacia cremiflora was first formally described in 1996 by the botanists Barry John Conn and Terrence Michael Tame in the journal Australian Systematic Botany. The specific epithet (cremiflora) refers to the distinctive, cream-coloured flowers.

== Distribution and habitat ==
This species of watlle is endemic to inland parts of New South Wales from around Uarby and Elong Elong in the north down to around Mudgee and Yerranderie in the south and extending as far west as Parkes. The more northern populations grow in woodlands and open woodland-grassland in stony, clayey loamy soils whereas populations in the south grow in Eucalyptus woodland in gravelly clay or sandy loam soils.

== See also ==
- List of Acacia species
