= Ascotolinx =

Scientific classification
- Kingdom: Animalia
- Phylum: Arthropoda
- Clade: Pancrustacea
- Class: Insecta
- Order: Hymenoptera
- Family: Eulophidae
- Subfamily: Eulophinae
- Genus: Ascotolinx; Girault, 1913

Type species
- Ascotolinx funeralis Girault, 1913

Species
- Ascotolinx funeralis Girault, 1913; Ascotolinx reticoxa Bouček, 1988

Genus of wasps

Ascotolinx is an Australasian genus of hymenopteran insects of the family Eulophidae. It was described by Alexandre Arsène Girault in 1913, and the genus is found in Australia and Papua New Guinea. Species host on lepidopteran leaf miners, namely Phyllocnistis citrella.

== Etymology ==
The genus name derives "asco" from the Ancient Greek word askos. Askos refers to that with the shape of a sac, and in the wasp's case refers to the fovea in the gaster's first plate.
