= Mentha atrolilacina =

Scientific classification
- Kingdom: Plantae
- Clade: Tracheophytes
- Clade: Angiosperms
- Clade: Eudicots
- Clade: Asterids
- Order: Lamiales
- Family: Lamiaceae
- Genus: Mentha
- Species: M. atrolilacina

Binomial name
- Mentha atrolilacina B.J.Conn & D.J.Duval

Species of flowering plant

Mentha atrolilacina, or slender mint, is a species within the Mentha (mint) genus, endemic to southeastern South Australia. It has been identified only within the Honans Native Forest Reserve, near Mount Gambier, South Australia. Prior to its identification in 2010, specimens of M. atrolilacina had been considered part of the related species Mentha diemenica. The species was discovered by the South Australian Seed Conservation Centre (SASCC).

== Name ==
The taxonomic name atrolilacina derives from Latin atrolilacinus meaning "dark lilac," in reference to the color of the corolla lobes of the species. It shares its common name "Slender mint" with the species Mentha diemenica from which it was distinguished.

== Description ==
Mentha atrolilacina is similar in appearance to Mentha satureioides (native pennyroyal), Mentha diemenica and Mentha pulegium (pennyroyal). It grows up to 55 centimeters high, with hairy stems and branches. Its aromatic leaves are ovate to broadly ovate and grow 6 to 11 millimeters long.

Mentha atrolilacina is distinguished from M. diemenica primarily by its much darker corolla. It also differs in its more broadly cordate leaves and its included (non-protruding) stamen.
