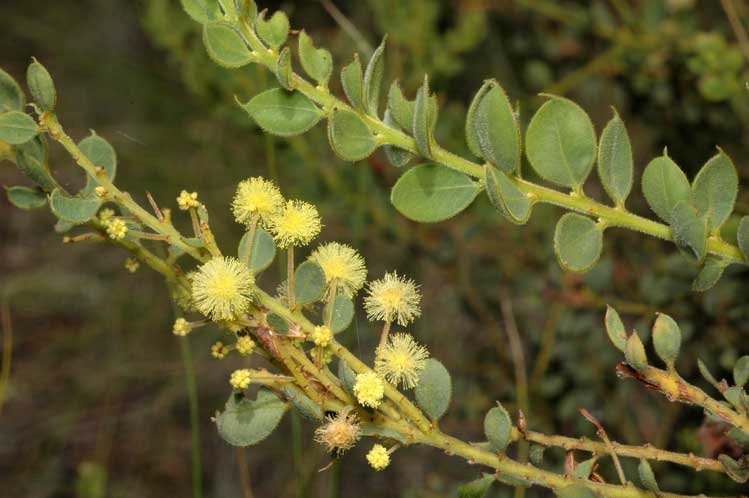
- Near Cooma

Scientific classification
- Kingdom: Plantae
- Clade: Tracheophytes
- Clade: Angiosperms
- Clade: Eudicots
- Clade: Rosids
- Order: Fabales
- Family: Fabaceae
- Subfamily: Caesalpinioideae
- Clade: Mimosoid clade
- Genus: Acacia
- Species: A. aureocrinita

Binomial name
- Acacia aureocrinita B.J.Conn & Tame
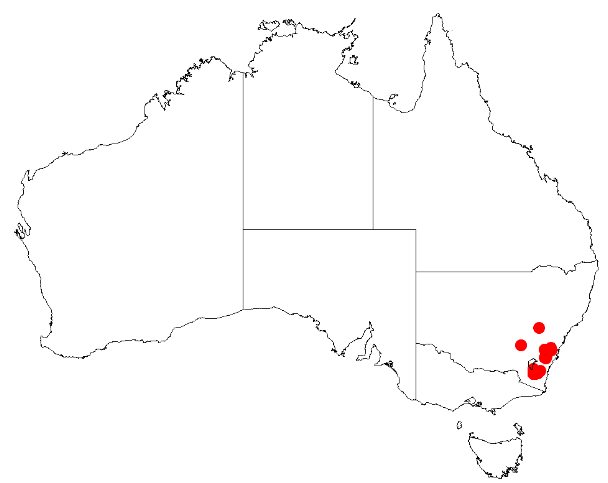
- Acacia aureocrinita occurrence data from Australasian Virtual Herbarium

Synonyms
- Racosperma aureocrinitum (B.J.Conn & Tame) Pedley

= Acacia aureocrinita =

Species of legume

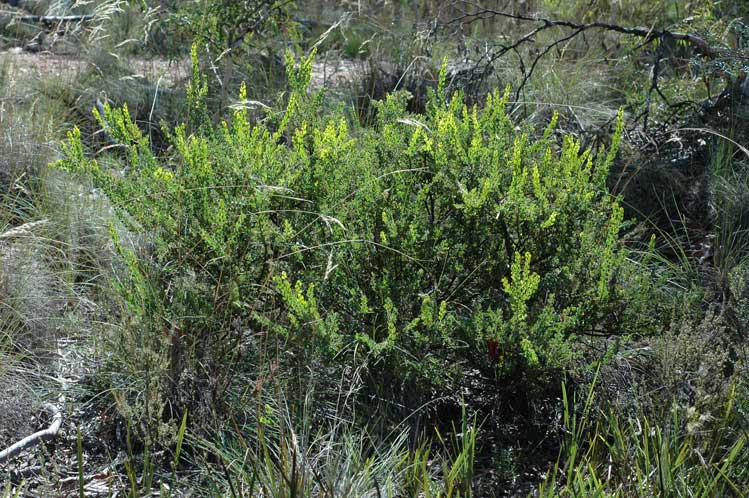
Habit

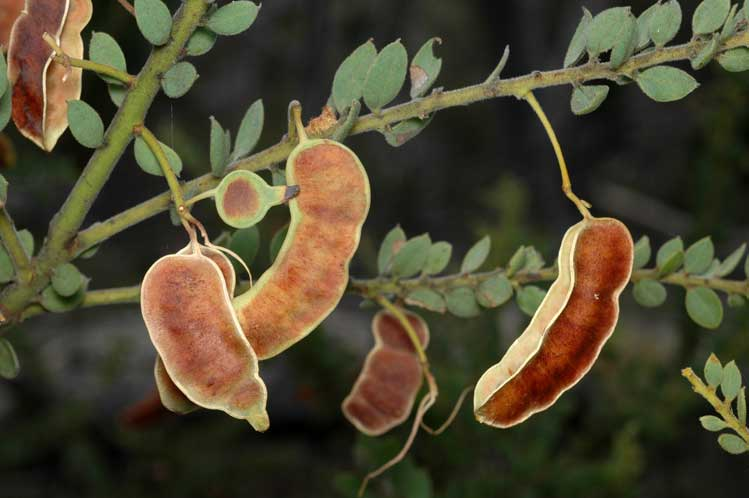
Pods

Acacia aureocrinita is a species of flowering plant in the family Fabaceae and is endemic to southern New South Wales. It is a bushy shrub with elliptic to broadly elliptic phyllodes, spherical heads of pale yellow to cream-coloured flowers arranged singly in axils, and oblong, gently curved, leathery pods up to 80 mm (3.1 in) long.

== Description ==
Acacia aureocrinita is a bushy shrub that typically grows to a height of less than 1 m (3 ft 3 in) but can reach as high as 1.8 m (5 ft 11 in). It has six or more primary branches that diverge at ground level. The branchlets are terete, brown-green to brown, ribbed and densely hairy. The phyllodes are elliptic to broadly elliptic, mostly 8–12 mm (0.31–0.47 in) long and 4–7 mm (0.16–0.28 in) wide. The flowers are arranged in a spherical head in axils, each head on an ascending peduncle 7–11 mm (0.28–0.43 in) long, 7–11 mm (0.28–0.43 in) in diameter with 18 to 26 pale yellow to cream-coloured flowers. Flowering occurs during the warmer months, and the pods are leathery, oblong, usually gently curved, light brown to brown, 50–80 mm (2.0–3.1 in) long and 12–17 mm (0.47–0.67 in) wide.

== Taxonomy ==
Acacia aureocrinita was first formally described by the botanists Barry John Conn and Terry Tame in 1996 in the journal Australian Systematic Botany. This species is similar to Acacia uncinata but differs in its much-branched, bushy habit and phyllodes sometimes up to 17 mm (0.67 in) long.

== Distribution and habitat ==
This species of wattle is found along the eastern watershed of the Southern Tablelands of south western New South Wales between the Shoalhaven River and Numeralla east, of Cooma. It is found on ridges and steep valley slopes, often with Eucalyptus pauciflora and E. rossii.

== See also ==
- List of Acacia species
