= Ascotolinx reticoxa =

Scientific classification
- Kingdom: Animalia
- Phylum: Arthropoda
- Clade: Pancrustacea
- Class: Insecta
- Order: Hymenoptera
- Family: Eulophidae
- Genus: Ascotolinx
- Species: A. reticoxa

Binomial name
- Ascotolinx reticoxa Bouček, 1988

Species of insect

Ascotolinx reticoxa is a species of insect from the Eulophidae family. It was described by Zdeněk Bouček in 1988. Male specimens are entirely black while females are mostly black, with slight blue coloration on their thorax and yellow-colored legs.

== Etymology ==
The specific epithet is a combination of the Latin root, rētī, which translates to "net," and the anatomical term coxa, which refers to the basal segment of an arthropod's limbs. The first term refers to the "fine raised reticulation" (net-like patterns) on the wasp's second, third, and fourth gastral tegrites.

== Distribution ==
The species is found exclusively in Queensland, in Hope Vale, Kuranda, Conway Range, Cape Hillsborough, Hidden Valley Track, Byfield, Cooloola, Mount Glorious, Cecil Plains, and Wilsons Peak.
