= Bungonia National Park =

National park in New South Wales, Australia

- IUCN category II (national park)
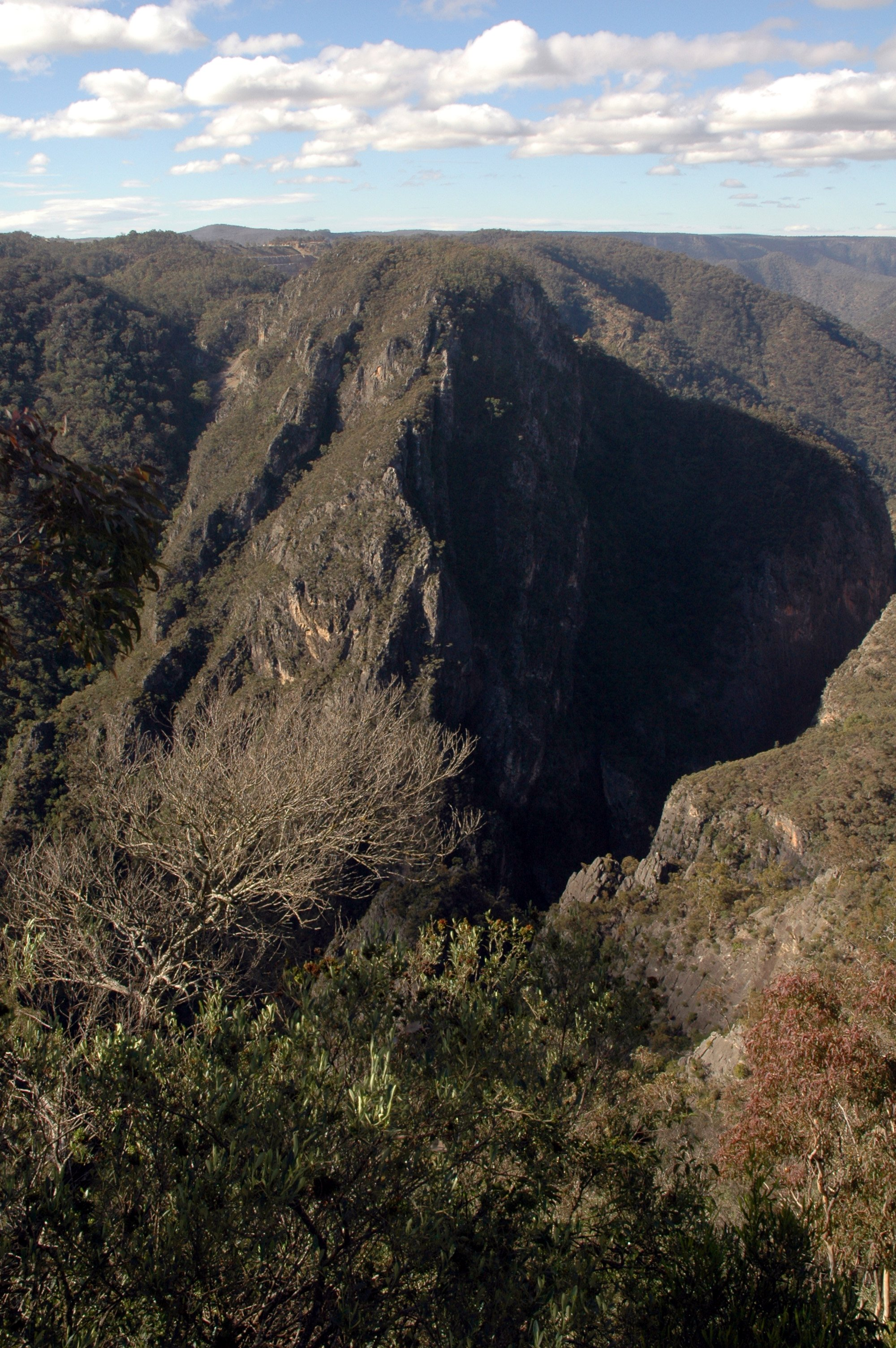
- The view from Bungonia Lookdown of the Bungonia Gorge.

- Location within New South Wales
- Location: New South Wales
- Nearest city: Goulburn
- Coordinates: 34°48′13″S 150°01′23″E
- Area: 15 km^{2} (5.8 sq mi)
- Established: 21 May 2010
- Governing body: NSW National Parks and Wildlife Service
- Website: https://www.nationalparks.nsw.gov.au/visit-a-park/parks/bungonia-national-park

Bungonia National Park is a protected national park in the Australian state of New South Wales, roughly 40 kilometres (25 mi) east of the city of Goulburn and 122 km (76 mi) south-west of Sydney.

The park is managed by the NSW National Parks and Wildlife Service (NPWS) which maintains several campgrounds and walking trails throughout the park. The park is most famous for its many caves and gorges, which offer a variety of climbing and canyoning opportunities. Bungonia National Park is also notable for its position in a chain of national parks that extend down the central NSW section of the Great Dividing Range, including Morton National Park, Budawang National Park, and Bimberamala National Park.

== History ==
Bungonia National Park sits across the traditional lands of the indigenous Njunawal tribal group, the northwest corner of the Wandandian tribal region, and the southern boundary of the Gandangara tribal group. The prominent ridge tops are considered historically significant travel routes for tribes who moved with the seasonal harvest. Archaeological evidence of campsites has been found on the main plateau, along with limestone dolines that contain the remnants of edible plants consumed by Aboriginal peoples.

The first white visitors passed through the area in 1798, led by H. Hacking, the quartermaster of the ship Sirius. The establishment of European settlement in this region began around the 1820s, with Goulburn settled in the 1840s and the town of Bungonia set to be created in 1832. Governor of NSW George Gipps visited the park in 1838, walking to the lookout now known as Bungonia Lookdown.

The area now known as Bungonia National Park was initially established as a water reserve in 1872, to protect the water supply extracted from the Shoalhaven River. Also in 1872, a visit was reported to the Drum Cave and the Sky-Light Cave, named after the sound made when a stalactite was struck and the large hole in the roof, respectively. Multiple minor explorations of the park were made by Europeans throughout the late 1800s, to explore the many cave systems which were prominent features of the area.

Visitor records for the park began in 1892 when 85 visitors were recorded. By 1899, this number had increased to 559, with exploration of the caves costing 15 pounds per party "candlesticks provided".

A larger portion of this region was later reserved in 1902 for the preservation of fragile limestone rock formations in the park, primarily caves. The original caretaker of the park, Louis Guymer who worked between 1889–1909, discovered and recorded the extensive caves throughout the park. Guymer built many of the gates and ladders which continue to allow access to cave networks and climbing routes.

In the 1970s, the area was involved in a series of disputes between the NSW state government, conservation groups, and several mining companies. Mining lease applications for large amounts of limestone quarrying in Bungonia Gorge were made by Southern Portland Cement and the Associated Portland Cement Manufacturers, from 1972 until 1974. Pressure on the state government from the Bungonia Committee through a series of geological and environmental reports eventually led to the declaration of the Bungonia State Conservation Area in July 1974. The northernmost portion of this reserve was eventually raised to national park status.

== Geology ==
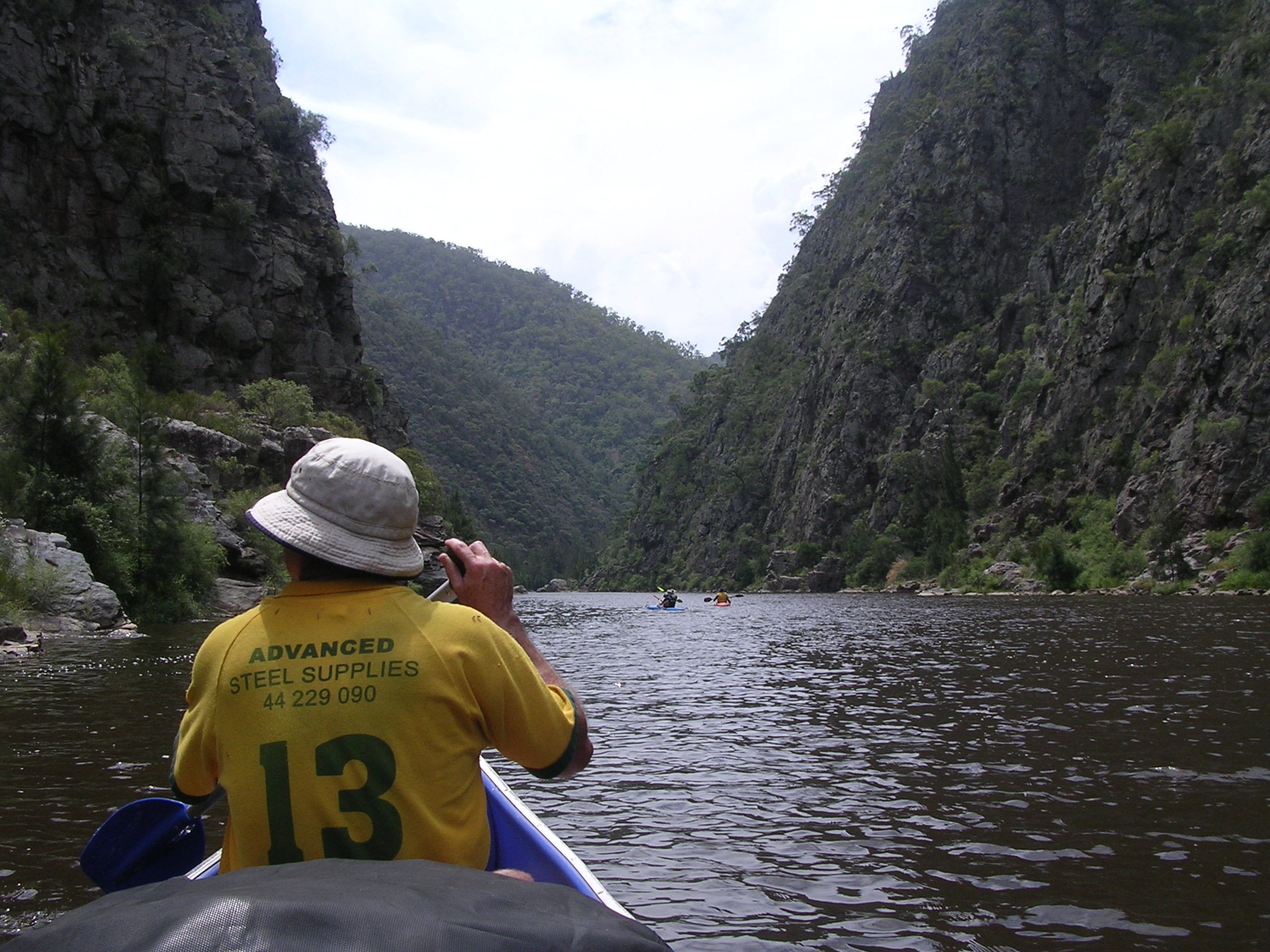
Extensive gorges are a major feature of the park and attract many visitors

Bungonia National Park is notable for its unique geology which has given it a status as the "adventure capital of the Southern Tablelands". The park contains over 200 caves and numerous gorges and canyons. The formations in Bungonia are part of the Lachlan Fold Belt which is made up of metamorphosed ordovician and devonian sandstones, shales and volcanic rocks. The rock sequence in Bungonia is highly mineralised and part of a larger series of formations which contain gold deposits of economic importance to the region.

The geology of Bungonia is mostly defined by fine-grained palaeozoic sedimentary with some minor regions of acid volcanoes and limestone. A wide dry plateau makes up a great deal of the land area in the park with many cliffs and gorges occurring near prominent water-ways such as the Shoalhaven River and Bungonia Creek. The caves and fissures of the park are common of the geologic action of karstification, seen in limestone features.

Limestone and sandstone are the two most prominent surface rock types in the park and make up most of the open formations. Part of the Bungonia Gorge and Bungonia slot canyon run through this park and such formations are characteristic of this type of sedimentary and volcanic activity which formed the original geology of the park. Soil in Bungonia is mostly shallow structured organic loams which lie atop of the limestone and basalt plates which form the main plateau.

== Flora and fauna ==
=== Flora ===
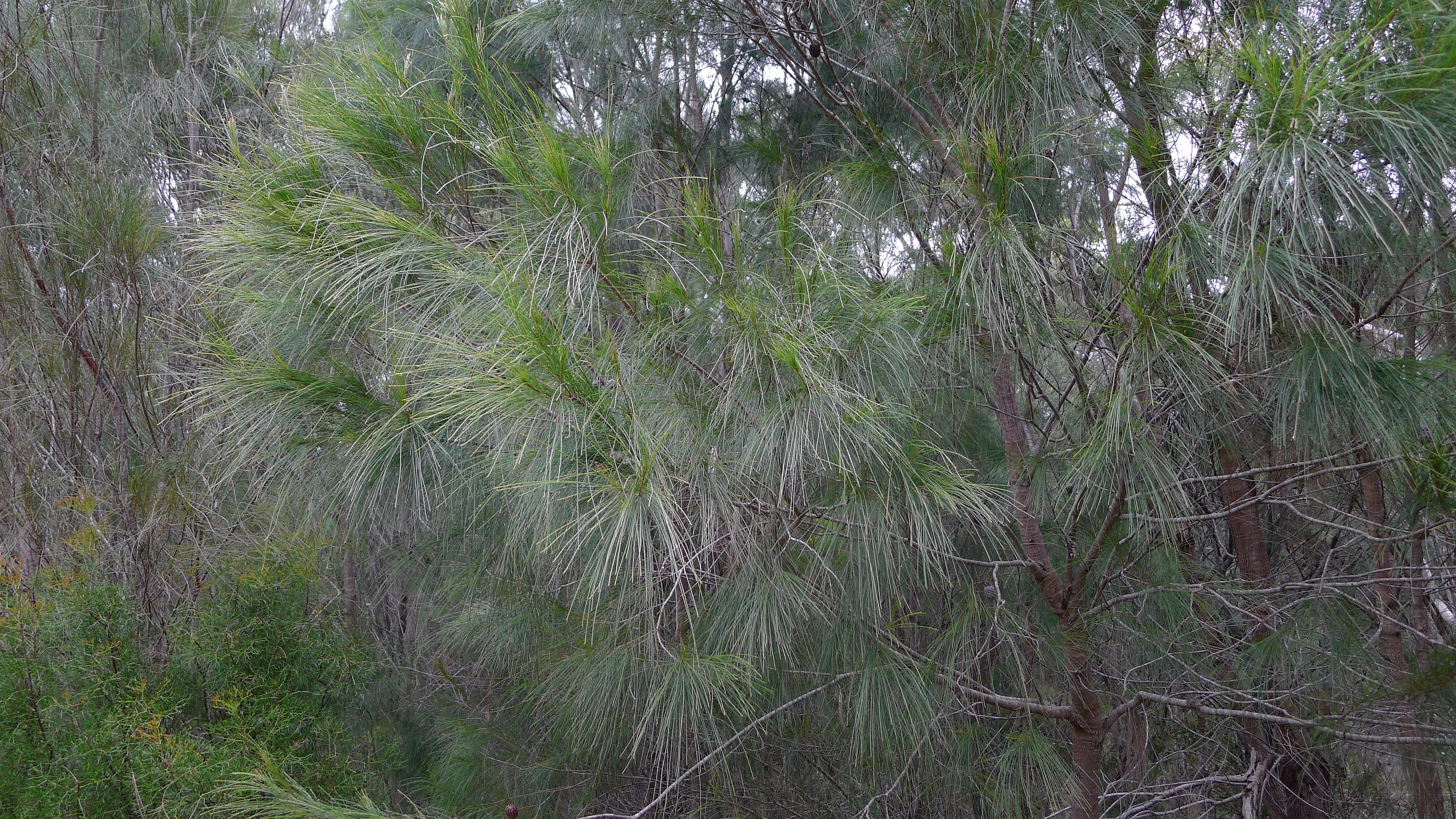
Black she-oak is a prominent part of the vegetation in the park

The vegetation of Bungonia National Park is extensive and with most species occurring throughout the Southern Tablelands region. Bungonia is known to contain broad-leaved peppermint (Eucalyptus dives), white gum (Eucalyptus wandoo), grass trees (Xanthorrhoea), red stringybark (Eucalyptus macrorhyncha), and large amounts of black ash (Eucalyptus sieberi) forest. Eucalyptus dominate the landscape, especially on the main plateau. In colder sections of the park, snow gum (Eucalyptus pauciflora), and snow grass (Poa sieberiana), thrive, particularly in winter. Like much of the southern portion of the Great Dividing Range, black she-oak (Allocasuarina littoralis) is common to lower canopy and regeneration areas. There is also some restricted growth of the argyle apple (Eucalyptus cinerea), known for its soft blue foliage.

=== Fauna ===
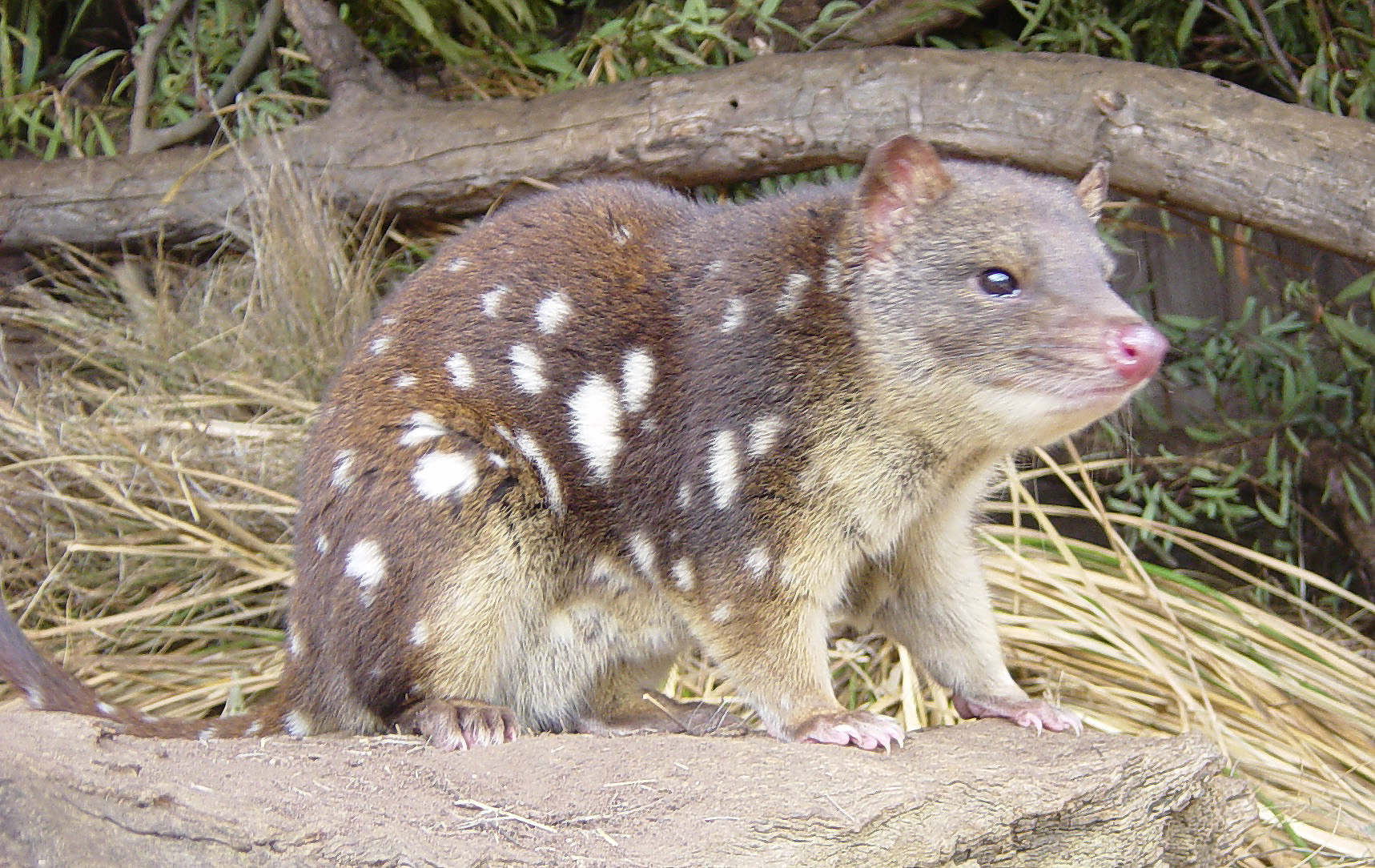
A small population of spotted-tail quolls inhabit the park

Fauna common in the park are found throughout the South Eastern Highlands with eighty-eight species inhabiting the area. Sixty-three of these species are vulnerable whilst twenty-five are endangered. Dozens of bird species are found in the park and many of the lookouts are bird-watching locations. Birds that frequent Bungonia National Park include the gang-gang cockatoo, butcher bird, noisy miner, glossy black cockatoo, the swift parrot, common cockatoo, hooded robin, square tailed kite, and the kookaburra. A general decline in the population of smaller woodland bird species has been recorded in the late 20th century along with an increase in the butcher-bird, noisy miner, and common-myna population. Other fauna in the park include the vulnerable large bent-wing bat which breeds in many of the caves in the cooler parts of the year. Monitor lizards, echidnas, wombats, wallabies, and small populations of koalas and spotted-tail quolls also inhabit the park.

== Climate and environmental issues ==
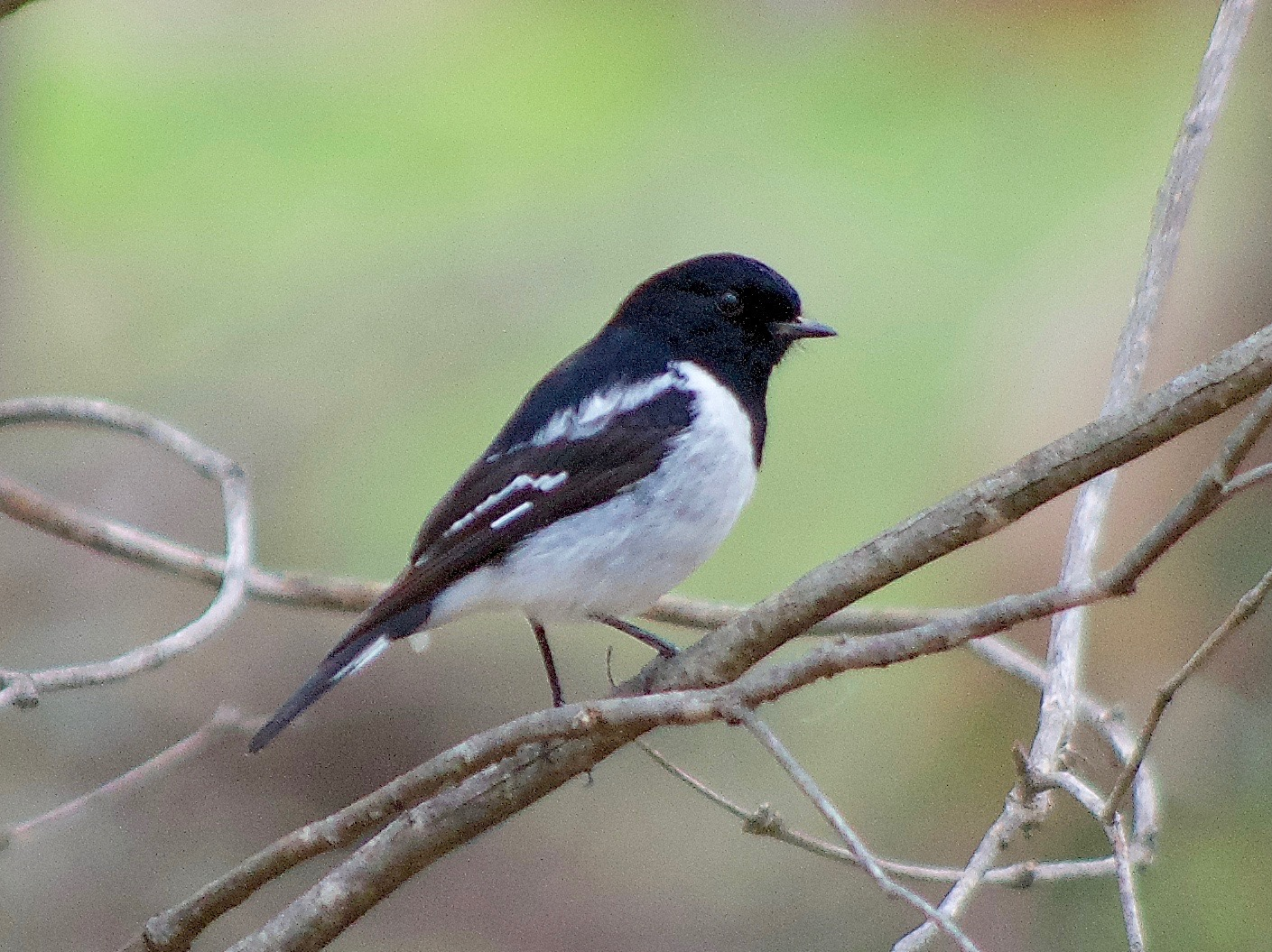
Hooded robins are a threatened species in the park due to habitat destruction

The average summer temperature in Bungonia National Park is between 12 degrees Celsius and 26 degrees Celsius with the highest recorded temperature being 40 degrees Celsius. Due to its increased altitude and inland southerly position, the park receives very cool winter temperatures. On average the temperature sits between 1 degree Celsius and 14 degrees Celsius with the lowest ever recorded temperature being -9 degrees Celsius. Average rainfall in the region is around 665 mm with most precipitation occurring in March and the least in September. The highest recorded rainfall in a single day is 200.7 mm.

Environmental issues in the park are most prominent in the koala and spotted-tail quoll population, both of which are endangered by habitat destruction and feral animals. NSW Parks have been conducting feral animal control programs since 2005.

Small woodland bird species such as the hooded robin and varied sittella have also come under threat due to habitat destruction caused by mining projects in the region. Larger native and non-native birds that are more wide-ranging have begun to take over these areas and are gradually driving out these less-hardy species. The threatened large bent-wing bat breeds caves in the park as mating and hibernating locations. This has led to NPWS regularly closing off the Drum and Grill caves to protect the population during their vulnerable breeding season.

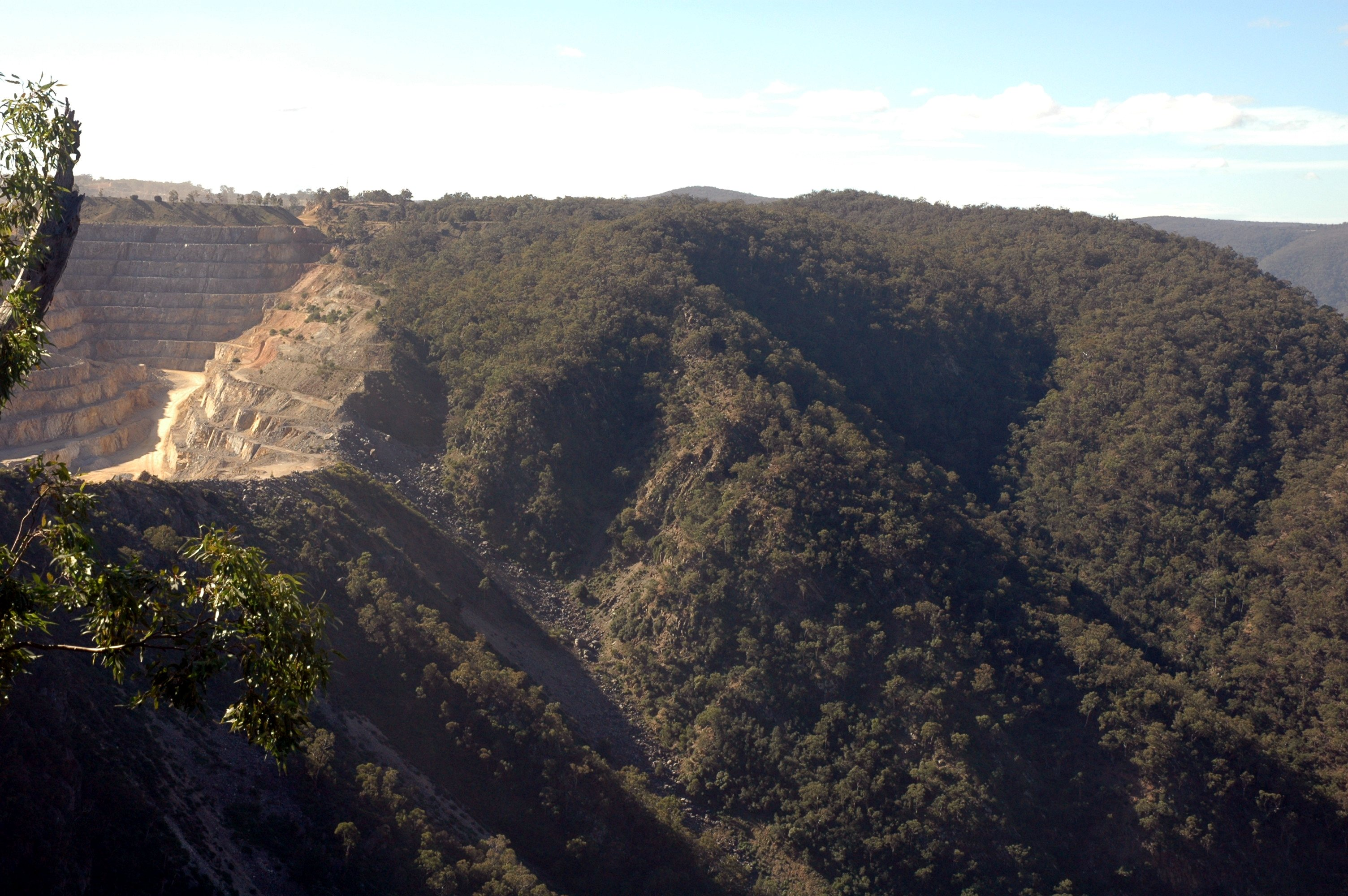
The Boral limestone quarry at the northern end of Bungonia Gorge. Large boulders can be seen rolling down the sides of the hill into the gorge below

A large limestone quarry operated by Boral Limited immediately to the north of the Bungonia Gorge has also raised concerns regarding the preservation of significant geology in the area. The quarrying run-off poses a risk to water sources in the area whilst land clearing and subsequent erosion has threatened certain parts of the gorge structure and the eucalypt forest which covers the hills surrounding the valley. Site remediation was due to follow the closure of the quarry in 2011, however in 2015 Boral Limited requested a 30-year extension on their lease. Their current activities involve filling in the southern end of the pit and re-vegetating their emplacements with native species whilst they continue to quarry the northern section.

== Park highlights ==
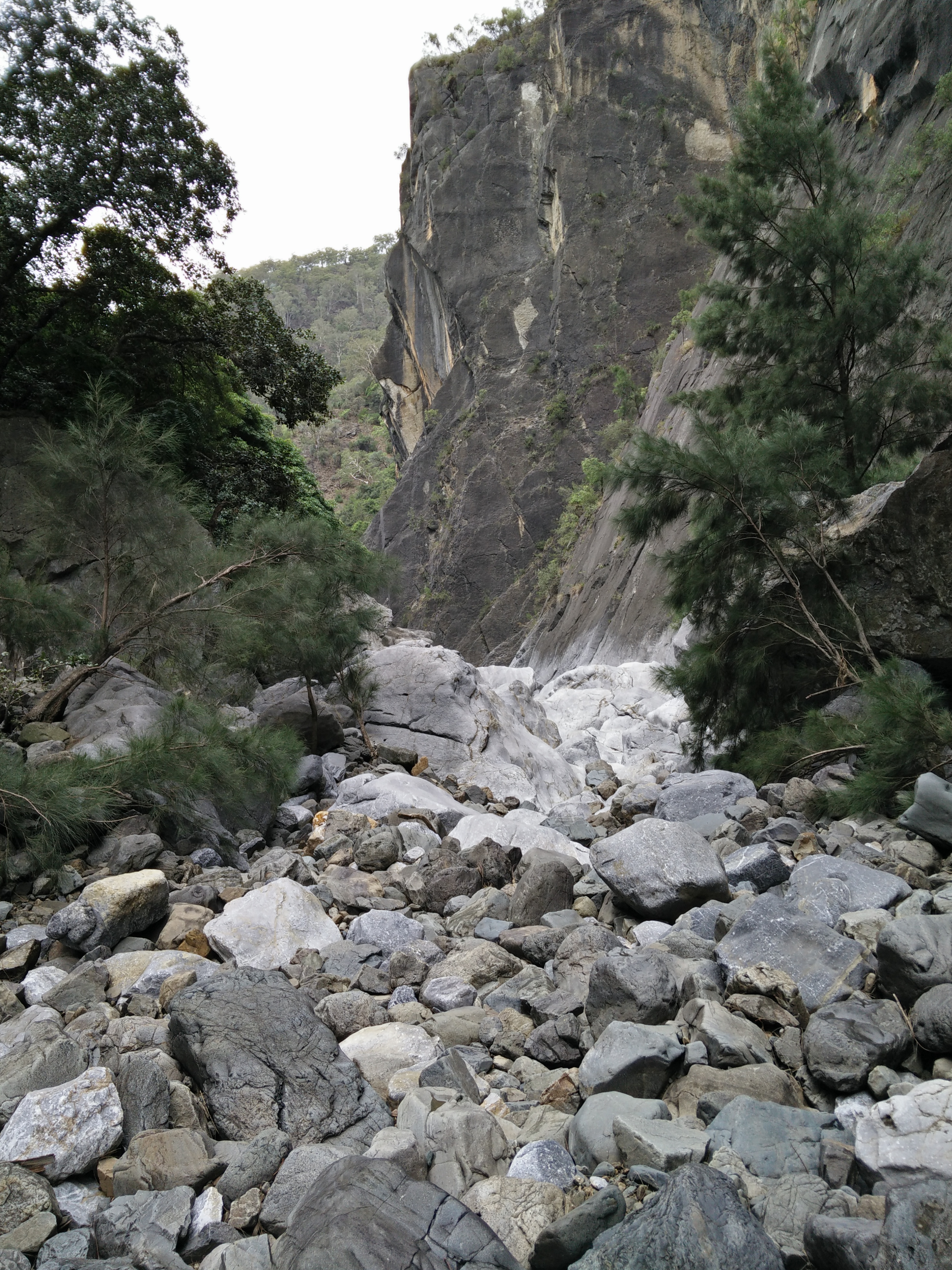
Slot Canyon.

Caving is a popular activity in the park with hundreds of caves open to explore throughout the year. Access to many of these caves is via ladders or by anchored ropes which allows their use by experienced and inexperienced cavers alike. Several of the larger caves include the Drum Cave and Grill Cave. Other caves include the Blowfly Cave, Argyle Cave, Chalk Cave, College Cave, Canberra Hole, Fossil Cave, Spider and dozens of other unnamed caves. Dangerous levels of CO_{2} are often present in these systems, especially in summer.

Marked hiking trails are maintained throughout the park with five main tracks. These five tracks are called the Yellow Track, Green Track, Red Track, White Track, and Orange Track. An access road links many of these tracks to the main office and visitor centre. Adams Lookout, Jerrara Lookout and Bungonia Lookdown are all well positioned locations for viewing the gorges and valleys that surround the plateau. There are three picnic areas in the park and one camping area, all of which are managed by NPWS and are open for public access.

Bungonia Slot Canyon provides many opportunities for bouldering and harnessed line climbing and offers some of the only limestone climbing available in Australia.

== Incidents ==
Numerous accidents have occurred in Bungonia National Park, partly due to its popularity with cavers and climbers, as well as its lack of marked tracks and dense bushland. Several fatalities and injuries have been recorded since 1991.

The death by falling of an outdoor education student in 1991 was investigated by homicide detectives who suspected that the victim had been threatened and later pushed by one of the other students. No charges were ever laid however as the coroner could not identify what caused the fall.

In 2001, emergency services were called on to rescue a man who had become trapped between rocks in Bungonia National Park.

A 2005 incident involved the injury of a woman from Gladesville who became lost after an orienteering activity in the park. She was later treated for hypothermia.

In 2014, three men who were caving in Bungonia became trapped after a flash flood occurred and access was cut off. The men were trapped for nearly 24 hours before being rescued by NSW Search and Rescue workers.

== See also ==
- Protected areas of New South Wales
