= Barry John Conn =

Australian botanist

- Born: 1948 (age 76–77)
- Scientific career
- Fields: Botany; Plant Systematics; Lamiaceae; Urticaceae; Loganiaceae
- Thesis: A taxonomic revision of Prostanthera Labill. section Klanderia (F.v. Muell.) Benth. (Labiatae) (1982)
- Author abbrev. (botany): B.J.Conn

Barry John Conn, born 1948, is an Australian botanist. He was awarded a Ph.D. from the University of Adelaide in 1982 for work on Prostanthera.

The standard author abbreviation B.J.Conn is used to indicate this person as the author when citing a botanical name.

== Career ==
Conn's first appointment as a botanist was with the Lae Herbarium in 1974. He then became herbarium curator and a lecturer at the Papua New Guinea Forestry College, Bulolo (1976–1979). He is a scientific advisor to the Food and Agriculture Organisation. In Australia, he has been senior botanist at the National Herbarium of Victoria (1982–1987), and botanist (and principal research scientist) at the National Herbarium of New South Wales (1987–2015). In 1994-1995, he was Australian Botanical Liaison Officer at Kew. While with the National Herbarium of New South Wales, he managed the Australia’s Virtual Herbarium Project for New South Wales, and was scientific editor of the journal Telopea from 2013 to 2015.

== Some published names ==
- Acacia aureocrinita B.J.Conn & Tame, Austral. Syst. Bot. 9(6): 851 (1996) (1996).
- Acacia cremiflora B.J.Conn & Tame, Austral. Syst. Bot. 9(6): 853 (1996) (1996).
- Actephila forsteri B.J.Conn, Telopea 20: 11 (2017).
- Dasymalla chorisepala (Munir) B.J.Conn & Henwood, Austral. Syst. Bot. 24(1): 6 (2011).
- Drosera hookeri R.P.Gibson, B.J.Conn & Conran, J. Adelaide Bot. Gard. 24: 41 (2010).
- Mentha atrolilacina B.J.Conn & D.J.Duval, Telopea 12(4): 521 (2010)

See IPNI.
(Some 174 species listed, not all currently accepted)

== Plants named in his honour ==
- Prostanthera conniana (and in honour of his wife)

== Publications ==
(incomplete)

=== Books ===
- Womersley, J.S.; Henty, E.E.; Conn, B.J., eds. (1978). Handbooks of the flora of Papua New Guinea(Vol I). Melbourne: Melbourne University Press.
- Henty, E.E.; Womersley, J.S.; Conn, B.J., eds. (1981). Handbooks of the flora of Papua New Guinea (Vol II). Melbourne: Melbourne University Press.
- Conn, B.J., ed. (1995). Handbooks of the flora of Papua New Guinea (Vol III). Melbourne: Melbourne University Press.

=== Articles ===
- Conn, B. J.; Streiber, N.; Brown, E. A.; Henwood, M. J.; Olmstead, R. G. (2009). "Infrageneric phylogeny of Chloantheae (Lamiaceae) based on chloroplast ndhF and nuclear ITS sequence data". Australian Systematic Botany. 22 (4): 243. doi:10.1071/SB09011.
- Conn, Barry; Duval, David (2010). "Mentha atrolilacina (Lamiaceae), a new species from South Australia". Telopea: 521–524. doi:10.7751/telopea20105843.
- Conn, Barry J. (1998). "Contributions to the systematics of Prostanthera (Labiatae) in south-eastern Australia". Telopea. 7 (4): 319–332. doi:10.7751/telopea19982003.
- Conn, B.J. (2013). "A new species of Saurauia (Actinidiaceae) from Papua New Guinea". Telopea. 15: 9–12. doi:10.7751/telopea2013003.
- Conn, Barry J. (1984). "A taxonomic revision of Prostanthera Labill. section Klanderia (F.v. Muell.) Benth.(Labiatae)". Journal of the Adelaide Botanic Gardens. 6 (3): 207–348. JSTOR 23873911.
- Conn, B. J. (1980). "A taxonomic revision of Geniostoma subg. Geniostoma (Loganiaceae)". Blumea - Biodiversity, Evolution and Biogeography of Plants. 26 (2): 245–364.
- Hadiah, Julisasi T.; Conn, Barry J.; Quinn, Christopher J. (2008). "Infra-familial phylogeny of Urticaceae, using chloroplast sequence data". Australian Systematic Botany. 21 (5): 375. doi:10.1071/SB08041. pdf
- Conn, B.J. (1981). "THE DROSERA PELTATA -D. AURICULATA COMPLEX" (PDF). Journal of the Adelaide Botanic Garden. 3 (1): 91–100.
- Gibson, R.P.; Conn, B.J.; Conran, J.G. (2010). "Drosera hookeri R.P.Gibson, B.J.Conn & Conran, a replacement name for Drosera foliosa Hook.f. ex Planch., nom. illeg. (Droseraceae)" (PDF). Journal of the Adelaide Botanic Garden. 24: 39–42.
