= List of Grevillea cultivars =

List of cultivars in the plant genus Grevillea

This is a list of cultivars of the plant genus Grevillea.

== A to E ==
Cultivar	Image	Registration	Parentage and notes	Reference
'Allyn Radiance'		PBR: received 1996, granted 1998	G. juniperina var. aurea (prostrate orange) x G. juniperina var. rubra (prostrate red). Released 1995.	
'Aphrodite's Dream'		PBR: received and accepted 2019, granted 2023	(G. concinna subsp. lehmanniana) × G. banksii 'White Candelabra'	
'Apricot Charm'			Chance seedling from the garden of Bywong Nursery.	
'Apricot Glow'				
'Apricot Hots'		PBR: received 2022, accepted 2023	G. bipinnatifida x G. pteridifolia	
'Aromas'			Similar to type form of G. rosmarinifolia. Has been commercially available in the United States, but unknown in Australia.	
'Audrey'			G. juniperina x G. victoriae Synonym of G. 'Audreyae'. Originated in 1957.	
(Austraflora cultivars)			listed by second name, e.g. 'Austraflora Bon Accord > 'Bon Accord'	
'Autumn Waterfall'		PBR: received and accepted 2004, granted 2006	G. bipinnatifida (glauca form) x G. 'Honey Gem'	
'Bairnsdale'		ACRA: received 1985, accepted 1989	seedling selection of G. 'Poorinda Constance'	
'Bedspread'		PBR: accepted 2001, granted 2003	G. wilkinsonii x G. ‘Poorinda Royal Mantle’	
'Billy Bonkers'			G. nana subsp. abbreviata x G. 'Sid Cadwell'	
'Birdsong'		PBR: received 1999, accepted 2000, granted 2003	G. 'Honey Gem' x G. banksii	
'Blood Orange'		PBR: received and accepted 2006, granted 2009	Selections of G. 'Honey Gem'	
'Bon Accord'		ACRA: received 1985, accepted 1986	G. johnsonii x G. wilsonii	photo
'Bonfire'			G. johnsonii x G. wilsonii	
'Bonnie Prince Charlie'		ACRA: received 1982, accepted 1992	G. rosmarinifolia and G. alpina (Grampians form)	photo
'Boongala Spinebill'			G. bipinnatifida x G. caleyi	
'Border Red'				
'Bronze Rambler'		ACRA:received 1985, accepted 1988	G. rivularis x G. 'Poorinda Peter'	
'Brookvale Letitia'		ACRA:received 1978, accepted 1988	G. barkylana subsp. macleayana x G. acanthifolia subsp. acanthifolia; also known as G. 'Toowoomba Beauty'	photo
'Burke 1'		PBR: received and accepted 1999, granted 2004	Multiple varieties of G. banksii (var. fosterii, ‘Ruby Red’ and unnamed prostrate white form) and ‘Misty Pink’ (G. banksii var fosterii x G. sessilis).	
'Burke 2'		PBR: received and accepted 1999, granted 2004	Same parentage as 'Burke 1'	
'Burke 3'		PBR: received and accepted 1999, granted 2004	Same parentage as 'Burke 1'	
'Callum's Gold'		PBR: received and accepted 2005, granted 2007	Seedling selection of G. 'Honey Gem'	
'Caloundra Gem'			G. banksii x G. 'Coochin Hills' (G. hodgei)	
'Canberra Gem'		ACRA: accepted 1976	G. juniperina x G. rosmarinifolia	
'Canterbury Gold'		ACRA: received 1978, accepted 1981	G. juniperina (prostrate yellow form) and G. victoriae var. leptoneura	photo
'Carpet Layer'		PBR: received and accepted 2007		
'Carpet Queen'				
'Cascade'			uncertain origin	
'Charlie's Angel'		PBR: received and accepted 2008, granted 2009	Seedling selection from G. 'Bonnie Prince Charlie'	
'Chatsworth Lorran'		ACRA: received 1990, accepted 1992	G. thelemanniana x unknown	photo
'Cherry Brandy'		ACRA: received 1981, accepted 1989	F2 hybrid of G. `Misty Pink',	photo
'Cherry Cluster'		PBR: received and accepted 2010, granted 2012	G. rhyolitica x G. juniperina 'Molongolo'	
'City Lights'		PBR: received and accepted 2019, granted 2023	G. nivea x G. pteridifolia	
'Claire Dee'			Red flowering form of G. banksii x G. bipinnatifida	photos
'Clearview David'		ACRA: accepted 1976	G. rosmarinifolia x G. 'Crosbie Morrison', raised by Bill Cane of Maffra, Victoria	photo
'Clearview John'			natural form of G. lanigera from Lake Glenmaggie	
'Clearview Robin'			G. lanigera (Snowy River form) x G. lanigera (Victor Harbor form)	
'Coastal Dawn'		PBR: received and accepted 1999, granted 2001	G. ‘Misty Pink’ x G. banksii ‘Red’	
'Coastal Gem'			form of G. lanigera	
'Coastal Glimpse'		PBR: received and accepted 2004, granted 2006	'Sandra Gordon' x (probably) 'Moonlight'	
'Coastal Glow'			G. barklyana subsp. macleayana x G. aspleniifolia or G. longifolia Also known as 'Frampton's Hybrid'	
'Coastal Impressive'		PBR: received and accepted 2004, granted 2006	'Sylvia' x 'Majestic'	
'Coastal Prestige'		PBR: received and accepted 2004, granted 2006	'Sylvia' x (possibly) 'Majestic'	
'Coastal Sunset'		PBR: received and accepted 1999, granted 2001	G. ‘Golden Yul Lo’ x G. banksii ‘Red’	
'Coastal Twilight'		PBR: received and accepted 2000, granted 2001	Seedling selection from seed parent 'Honey Gem' growing among other varieties.	
'Coconut Ice'		ACRA: received 1984, accepted 1993	G. bipinnatifida x G. banksii (white flowered form)	photo
'Cooroora Cascade'			F2 seedling of 'Golden Lyre'	
'Copper Crest'		ACRA: received 1977, accepted 1979	G. aquifolium × G. acanthifolia	photo
'Copper Rocket'			Similar to G. × gaudichaudii, but upright habit. Released by Faceys Nursery, Victoria	
'Coral'			Selected seedling of G. alpina (Cardinia form)	
'Crimson Carpet'		PBR: received and accepted 2016, granted 2021	Seedling selection of G. laurifolia and unknown pollen parent	
'Crimson Glory'		ACRA: received 1984, accepted 1988	G. acanthifolia x G. willisii	photo
'Crimson Villea'		PBR: received 2011, accepted 2012, granted 2017	Seedling selection from G. rosmarinifolia	
'Crosbie Morrison'		ACRA: accepted 1988	G. lanigera x G. lavandulacea. The name honours Victorian naturalist Philip Crosbie Morrison (1900 - 1958)	photo
'Crowning Glory'				
'Dargan Hill'			unknown origin	
'Desert Flame'			Form of G. rosmarinifolia from the Little Desert.	
'Deua Flame'			= G. rhylolitica subspecies semivestita	
'Deuagold'		PBR: granted and accepted 2011, granted 2018	G. rhyolicta 'Deua Flame' x G. juniperina 'Molonglo'	
'Dorothy'			G. lavandulacea x (possibly) G. obtusiflora. Produced in 1963.	
'Dorothy Gordon'		ACRA: received 2007, accepted 2009	G. sessilis x G. paradoxa	photos
'Dot Brown'		PBR: received and accepted 1995, granted 1997	Random pollination, parentage likely G. banksii x G. pteridifolia	
'Edna Ellen'			= G. 'Moonlight'	
'Edna Walling Softly Softly'			G. alpina x G. lanigera 'Blush'	
'Eileen Rose'		ACRA: received 1982, accepted 1988		
'Ellendale'			(or 'Ellendale Pool') = G. fililoba	
'Ember Glow'		PBR: received and accepted 2001, granted 2002	G. rhyolitica x G. juniperina 'Prostrate Red'	
'Evelyn's Coronet'		ACRA: received 1976, accepted 1977	G. buxifolia × G. lavandulacea	photo

== F to J ==
Cultivar	Image	Registration	Parentage and notes	Reference
'Fanfare'		ACRA: received 1979, accepted 1979	G. × gaudichaudii × G.longifolia; also known as 'Austraflora Fanfare'	
'Fire Sprite'		ACRA: received 1999, accepted 2007	Grevillea longistyla × Grevillea venusta	
'Fireworks'		PBR, received and accepted 2006, granted 2007	Grevillea 'Pink Pixie' × G. alpina	photo
'Fish Bone Flat'		PBR: received and accepted 2017, granted 2021	Seed selection from G. 'Gaudi Chaudi'	
'Flame 'n Beauty'		ACRA: received 1998, accepted 2006	G. asparagoides x G. calliantha	photo
'Flamingo'			G.'Superb' x G. 'Moonlight'	photo
'Forest Rambler'		ACRA: accepted 2007	A cultivar of unknown origin that appeared in cultivation in the 1980s. It has similarities in appearance to G. shiressii and G. 'Ruby Clusters'.	photo
'Forsteri'			form of G. banksii	
'Gelato Dream'		PBR: received and accepted 2019, granted 2023	(G. fastigiata × G. pinnatifida) x G. banksii 'white form'	
'Gin Gin Gem'			Prostrate form of Grevillea obtusifolia	
'Gin Gin Jewel'		PBR: received and accepted 2018, granted 2023	Seedling selection of G. 'Ruby Gem'	
'Glen Pearl'			Possibly a hybrid of G. victoriae x G. juniperina First grown in 1960	
'Glen Sandra'			Possibly a hybrid of G. juniperina x (possibly) G. rosmarinifolia. First grown in 1960.	
'Gold Cluster'		PBR: received and accepted 2010, granted 2013	Seedling selection from G. juniperina 'prostrate yellow'	
'Golden Glory'		ACRA: received 1984, accepted 1987	form of G. tenuiloba	photo
'Golden Lyre'			A hybrid of G. formosa x G. 'Honey Gem' Public release in 2005	
'Golden Sparkle'		ACRA, 1975	Variegated sport of G. audreyae first propagated in 1973.	photo
'Golden Yul-lo'		PBR, 1995	'Sandra Gordon' x unknown	
'Goldfever'		PBR, 2005	G. juniperina x Grevillea rhyolitica	
'Goldrush'		ACRA: received 1985, accepted 1992	G. alpina x G. rosmarinifolia	photo
'Grampians Gold'		ACRA, 1989	form of G. alpina	photo
'Granya Glory'		ACRA: received 1987, accepted 2000	G. lanigera x G. polybractea	
'Grassfire'			G. tetragonoloba x G.laurifolia	
'Green Glow'		ACRA: received 1983, accepted 1987	Grevillea tetragonoloba x Grevillea × gaudichaudii Originally named 'Wakiti Strata'.	photo
'Gypsy'		ACRA: received 1985, accepted 1990	form of Grevillea banksii	
'Gypsy Moon'			Originated from a G. 'Sandra Gordon' seedling selected by Owen Brown of Caloundra, Queensland in 1986. Released by Australis Plants in 2005.	
'Hilda Herbert'			Grevillea banksii x (possibly) G. 'Misty Pink'	
'Hills Jubilee'		ACRA: received 2007, accepted 2009	(Grevillea baueri x Grevillea alpina Warby Range form) x Grevillea rosmarinifolia 'Lutea' .	
'Honey Barbara'		ACRA: received 2007, accepted 2009	G. 'Honey Gem' x G. 'Sylvia'. In cultivation since 2000	
'Honey Gem'		ACRA, 1980	red form of Grevillea banksii x Grevillea pteridifolia	photo
'Honey Jo'		ACRA, 2009	G.sericea x G. linearifolia	
'Honey Moon'		PBR: received and accepted 2018, granted 2023	G. nivea x ('Misty Pink' x G. formosa)	
'Honey Wonder'		PBR	variegated sport of G. 'Honey Gem'	
'Honeybird Cream'				
'Honeybird Pink'				
'Honeybird Yellow'				
'Honeyeater Heaven'				
'Hot Lava'		PBR: received and accepted 2017, granted 2021		
'Hot Lips'			form of Grevillea banksii	
'Hunter Beauty'		ACRA: received 1998, accepted 2007	possibly G. aspleniifolia x G. laurifolia; prostrate	
'Ivanhoe'		ACRA: received 1967, accepted 1992	Grevillea longifolia x Grevillea caleyi. Believed to have originated in the Melbourne suburb of Ivanhoe	photo
'Jelly Baby'		PBR: received and accepted 2011, granted 2014	G. lanigera x G. lavandulacea Tanunda race	
'Jessie Cadwell'			Thought be a hybrid of G. longifolia x G. caleyi 'Nana'	
'Jester'		ACRA: received 1989, accepted 1993	G. 'Honey Gem' x G. 'Coconut Ice'	photo
'John Evans'			Thought to be a hybrid of G. baueri x G. rosmarinifolia 'Nana'	
'Jolly Swagman'			Also known as G. 'Humpty Dumpty'. Seedling of G. 'Royal Mantle'	
'Jubilee'		ACRA: received 1982, accepted 1985	G. rosmarinifolia x G. alpina	photo
'Judith'			Selection of G. alpina (Cardinia form)	

== K to O ==
Cultivar	Image	Registration	Parentage and notes	Reference
'Kay Williams'			Grevillea banksii x Grevillea 'Sandra Gordon'	
'Kentlyn'			= 'Mason's Hybrid'	
'Kimberley Gold'			Grevillea wickhamii x Grevillea miniata	
'Kimberly Moon'		PBR: received and accepted 2018, granted 2023	G. nivea x ('Misty Pink' x G. formosa)	
'Kingaroy Slippers'		ACRA: received 1977, accepted 1978	mutation of Grevillea banksii	photo
'Kings Celebration'				
'Kings Fire'			also known as 'Scarlet Moon'	
'Kings Rainbow'				
'Knockout'		PBR: received and accepted 2011, granted 2013	G. 'Fireworks' x G. 'New Blood'	
'Ladelle'		ACRA: accepted 1998	seedling of G. 'Misty Pink'; trademarked as G. 'Pink Flush';	photo
'Lady O'		PBR: received 2002, granted 2005	Grevillea victoriae x Grevillea rhyolitica	
'Lana Marie'				
'Landcare'		PBR: received and accepted 1994, granted 1997	Synonym G. 'Piccolo Pink'. G. ‘Misty Pink’ x Grevillea banksii ‘Ruby Red’ (prostrate form)	
'Lara Dwarf'		ACRA: received 1977, accepted 1978	A form of G. rosmarinifolia selected by David Jones in 1969 near Lara.	photo
'Legacy Flame'		PBR: received and accepted 2021, granted 2022	'New Blood' x 'Lemondaze'	
'Lemon Supreme'			Hybrid involving G. olivacea x G. preissii	
'Lillian'			Possibly a hybrid involving G. rosmarinifolia	
'Lime-Light'		ACRA: received 1977, accepted 1978	form of G. rosmarinifolia	photo
'Lime Spider'			Variegated sport of G. 'Honey Gem'	
'Little Honey'		PBR		
'Little Jessie'		ACRA: received 1998, accepted 2007	G.asparagoides x G. calliantha	
'Little Miss Muffet'			Grevillea sericea x Grevillea speciosa	
'Little Thicket'		ACRA: received 1977, accepted 1979	A natural hybrid with a suckering habit from Braidwood, New South Wales thought to be derived from a cross of G arenaria subsp. arenaria and G. lanigera. First cultivated in 1972, it was originally considered to be a form of G. obtusiflora.	photo
'Lollypops!'				
'Long John'		ACRA: accepted 2007	Grevillea longistyla x G. johnsonii: also known as G. 'Elegance'	
'Lorikeet Amber'		PBR		
'Lunar Light'		ACRA: accepted 1982	form of G. juniperina	
'Lyn Parry'		ACRA: received 1979, accepted 1982	Grevillea buxifolia x Grevillea sericea	photo
'Lyrebird'		ACRA: received 1984, accepted 1986		photo
'Magic Lantern'			Selected seedling of Grevillea alpina (Cardinia form)	
(Magic Lantern)			= Grevillea preissii subsp. glabrilimba	
'Majestic'			hybrid origin (Grevillea 'Misty Pink' seedling)	
'Marion'			Selected seedling of G. alpina (Cardinia form)	
'Mason's Hybrid'		ACRA: received 1980, accepted 1982	G. banksii x G. bipinnatifida; also known as G. 'Ned Kelly' and G. 'Kentlyn'	photo
'McDonald Park'		ACRA: received 1978, accepted 1981	G. rosmarinifoliax G. alpina	photo
'Merinda Gordon'		ACRA: received 1981, accepted 1986	Grevillea insignis and Grevillea asteriscosa	photo
'Midas Touch'			seedling of Grevillea juncifolia	
'Misty Pink'		ACRA: received 1975, accepted 2000	G. banksii (compact red flowering form) x G. sessilis	
'Molly'	|	PBR, 2005	G. aurea x G. bipinnatifida	
'Molonglo'		ACRA: received 1974, accepted 1974	G. juniperina (upright red flowered form x G. juniperina (prostrate yellow flowered form)	
'Moonlight'			selected form of Grevillea whiteana	
'Mt Tamboritha'			prostrate form of Grevillea lanigera	
'Nancy Otzen'				
'Nectar Delight'		ACRA: received 1988, accepted 1992	G. x gaudichaudii x Grevillea acanthifolia	
'Ned Kelly'			= 'Mason's Hybrid'	
'New Blood'			G. juniperina "Molonglo" x G. rhyolitica	
'Noellii'			Form of G. rosmarinifolia sold in the United States.	
'Old Gold'		ACRA: received 1982, accepted 1984	G. ilicifolia x G. juniperina (prostrate yellow form).	photo
'Olympic Flame'			A selected seedling of G. alpina (Cardinia form)	
'Orange Box'		PBR	Grevillea victoriae x G. juniperina	
'Orange Marmalade'		ACRA: received 1988, accepted 1991	G. glossadenia x G. venusta	photo

== P to R ==
Cultivar	Image	Registration	Parentage and notes	Reference
'Parakeet Pink'		PBR: received and accepted 2001, granted 2006	G. 'Misty Pink' x G. 'Honey Gem'	
'Parfait Cream'		ACRA: received 1986, accepted 1994	G. 'Pink Parfait' x Grevillea hodgei	photo
'Patricia Marie'		ACRA: received 1977, accepted 1978		
''Peaches and Cream'		PBR	white form of G. banksii x G. bipinnatifida (red)	
'Pendant Clusters'		ACRA: received 1977, accepted 1979	Grevillea chrysophaea x Grevillea baueri	photo
'Picasso'			Selected form of Grevillea synapheae sold in the United States	
'Pink Champagne'			F2 hybrid of G. 'Misty Pink'	
'Pink Gem'			Prostrate form of Grevillea humilis	
'Pinkie'			Seedling of Grevillea lanigera raised in Geelong	
'Pink Lady'			G. juniperina x possibly G. rosmarinifolia. Raised in Queanbeyan.	photo
'Pink Midget'		PBR, 2001	Grevillea leiophylla x Grevillea humilis subsp. maritima	
'Pink Parfait'		ACRA: received 1982, accepted 1982	F2 hybrid of 'Misty Pink'	photo
'Pink Star'		ACRA: accepted 1980	Grevillea baueri x ?	photo
'Pink Surprise'		ACRA: received 1976, accepted 1977	Grevillea whiteana x Grevillea banksii (red flower form)	photo
'Poorinda Adorning'		ACRA: received 1968, accepted 1978	seedling from a form of G. juniperina	photo
'Poorinda Annette'		ACRA: received 1968, accepted 1979	G. juniperina x small flowered form of G. alpina	
'Poorinda Anticipation'		ACRA: received 1975, accepted 1981	Grevillea longifolia x Grevillea willisii	
'Poorinda Beauty'		ACRA: received 1975, accepted 1977	form of G. juniperina x G. alpina	
'Poorinda Belinda'		ACRA: accepted 1975	G. juniperina x (yellow flower form of Grevillea obtusiflora x G. alpina	photo
'Poorinda Ben'		ACRA: received 1976, accepted 1982	seedling of G. 'Poorinda Peter'	photo
'Poorinda Beulah'		ACRA: received 1975, accepted 1978	seedling of G. 'Poorinda Blondie'	
'Poorinda Blondie'		ACRA: received 1975, accepted 1978	Seedling from G. "hookeriana"	photo
'Poorinda Constance'		ACRA: received 1964, accepted 1984	New South Wales form of G. juniperina x red flower form of G. victoriae	
'Poorinda Diadem'		ACRA: received 1975, accepted 1979	seedling of Grevillea 'Poorinda Leane'	photos
'Poorinda Elegance'		ACRA: received 1963, accepted 1977	Hybrid of New South Wales form of G. juniperina and G. alpina x G. 'obtusiflora'	photos
'Poorinda Emblem'		ACRA: received 1974, accepted 1978	Grevillea caleyi x G. 'Poorinda Peter'.	photo
'Poorinda Empress'		ACRA: received 1975, accepted 1978	Grevillea hookeriana x Grevillea caleyi	photo
'Poorinda Enchantment'		ACRA: received 1975, accepted 1979	seedling from G. 'Poorinda Blondie'	photo
'Poorinda Ensign'		ACRA: received 1975, accepted 1989	Grevillea lavandulacea and Grevillea ilicifolia	photo
'Poorinda Firebird'		ACRA: received 1967, accepted 1977	Grevillea speciosa x New South Wales form of Grevillea oleoides	photo
'Poorinda Gaye'		ACRA: received 1976, accepted 1984	Grevillea hookerana x Grevillea caleyi	photo
'Poorinda Gemini'		ACRA: received 1979, accepted 1984	Seedling of Grevillea hookerana	photo
'Poorinda Golden Lyre'		ACRA, 1963	G. alpina x G. victoriae	photo
'Poorinda Hula'		ACRA, 1975	G. trinervis and G. linearis	photo
'Poorinda Illumina'		ACRA, 1963	G. lavandulacea and G lanigera	photo
'Poorinda Jeanie'		ACRA, 1975	G. alpina and G. juniperina	photo
'Poorinda Jennifer Joy'		ACRA, 1964	G. speciosa and G. linearifolia	photo
'Poorinda Joyce'		ACRA, 1963	G. alpina x G. lavandulacea	photo
'Poorinda Leane'		ACRA, 1977	G. juniperina x G. victoriae	photos
'Poorinda Miriam'		ACRA, 1980	Seedling of G. 'Poorinda Blondie'	photos
'Poorinda Peter'		ACRA, 1980	G. acanthifolia x G. longifolia	photo
'Poorinda Pink Coral'		ACRA, 1977	G. juniperina x G. victoriae	photo
'Poorinda Queen'		ACRA, 1964	G. juniperina x yellow flower form of Grevillea victoriae	
'Poorinda Rachel'		ACRA, 1978	G. alpina and G. juniperina	photo
'Poorinda Refrain'		ACRA, 1978	New South Wales form of G. floribunda x G. juniperina	
'Poorinda Regina'		ACRA, 1978	Seedling of G. 'Poorinda Blondie'	photo
'Poorinda Rondeau'		ACRA, 1975	Grevillea lavandulacea x Grevillea baueri	photo
'Poorinda Rosy Morn'		ACRA, 1984	G. lavandulacea x form of G. baueri.	photo
'Poorinda Royal Carpet'		ACRA, 1979	G. laurifolia x G. willisi	photo
'Poorinda Royal Mantle'		ACRA, 1975	G. laurifolia x G. willisi	photo
'Poorinda Signet'		ACRA, 1977	G. juniperina x G. lanigera	photo
'Poorinda Silver Sheen'		ACRA, 1979	Seedling of Grevillea hookeriana	photo
'Poorinda Splendour'		ACRA, 1972	New South Wales form of G. juniperina x G. alpina	
'Poorinda Stephen'		ACRA, 1979	G. speciosa x G. oleoides	photo
'Poorinda Tranquillity'		ACRA	Grevillea lavandulacea and Grevillea alpina	photos
'Poorinda Vivacity'		ACRA, 1979	Grevillea speciosa x large leafed form of Grevillea oleoides	
'Pretty Pink'			Grevillea arenaria x G. 'Crosbie Morrison'. Introduced in Victoria in 1985.	
'Pryor's Hybrid'			see 'Scarlet Sprite'	
'Radiant Pink'			Natural hybrid of Grevillea lavandulacea from the Black Range near the Grampians, Victoria	
'Raptor'		PBR: received and accepted 2003, granted 2006	G. 'Copper Rocket' x G. laurifolia	
'Raspberry Ripple'		PBR: received 2017, accepted 2020, granted 2021	G. lanigera x G. juniperina	
'Red Clusters'				
'Red Coral'		PBR: received and accepted 2018, granted 2023	G. nivea x G. variifolia	
'Red Hooks'		ACRA, 1987	Grevillea hookeriana x Grevillea tetragonoloba. Often misidentified in the past as G. hookeriana.	photo
'Red Robin'		PBR: received 2021, accepted 2022, granted 2023	Seedling selection from G. juniperina	
'Red Sunset'				photo
'Red Wings'			form of Grevillea thelemanniana	
'Robyn Gordon'		ACRA: accepted 1974	G. banksii x G. bipinnatifida	
'Rosy Posy'		ACRA	form of G. rosmarinifolia	photos
'Ruby Clusters'		ACRA	Grevillea shiressii x Grevillea oleoides or a hybrid of Grevillea victoriae.	
'Ruby Dream'		PBR: received and accepted 2019, granted 2023	(G. coccinea × G. beardiana) x ('Ruby Red' × 'Misty Pink')	
'Ruby Red'			prostrate red-flowering form of G. banksii	
'Ruby Jewel'		PBR: received and accepted 2014, granted 2023		

== S to Z ==
Cultivar	Image	Registration	Parentage and notes	Reference
'Sandra Gordon'		ACRA: received 1976, accepted 1977	G. sessilis and G. pteridifolia	photo
'Scarlet Moon'		PBR: received 2015, accepted 2016, granted 2023	AKA 'Kings Fire'. G. nivea x G. 'Crowning Glory'	
'Scarlet Sprite'			Also known as 'Pryor's Hybrid' or 'Yarralumla Gem'. Form of G. rosmarinifolia	
'Sea Spray'			= Grevillea olivacea x Grevillea preissii. Grown by George Lullfitz in Wanneroo, Western Australia.	
× semperflorens			G. thelemanniana x G. juniperina var. sulphurea	
'Shirley Howie'		ACRA: received 1977, accepted 1978	G. sericea x G. capitellata	photo
'Showtime'		PBR: received and accepted 2019, granted 2023	(G. fastigiata × G. pinnatifida) × (G. banksii 'prostrate' × G. banksii 'Pink Candelabra')	
'Sid Cadwell'			unknown - possibly G. tetragonoloba	
'Sid Reynolds'		ACRA: accepted 1992	G. pinaster x G. commutata	
'Silvereye Cream'		PBR: received and accepted 2001, granted 2006	G. 'Misty Pink' x G. 'Honey Gem'	
'Simply Sarah'		ACRA 1999	G. longifolia x G. beadleana	
'Splendour'			G. speciosa and G. shiressii	
'Starfire'		ACRA, 1981	seedling of G. 'Honey Gem'	photo
'Starflame'		ACRA, 1981	seedling of G. 'Honey Gem'	photo
'Strawberry Smoothie'		PBR: received and accepted 2017, granted 2021		
'Sunkissed Waters'		PBR, 1991	A mutation of 'Poorinda Royal Mantle' with shorter leaves that are light green with a white to cream edge.	
'Sunrise'		ACRA: received 1988, accepted 1990	G. bipinnatifida x G. 'Clearview Robin'. Originally known as 'Wakiti Sunrise'.	
'Sunset Splendour'		ACRA: accepted 2007	G. 'Honey Gem' x north Queensland form of G. pteridifolia. Also known as 'Sunset Bronze'	photo
'Superb'		ACRA, 1981	white form of G. banksii x G. bipinnatifida (red)	photo
'Sylvia'			F2 hybrid of G. 'Pink Surprise'	
'Tangerine Dream'		PBR: received and accepted 2018, granted	(G. fastigiata x G. bipinnatifida x G. banksii) x ('Golden Yul-lo x G. banksii prostrate) x ('Little Honey' x G. formosa)	
'Tanunda'			form of G. lavandulacea from Aldinga in South Australia	
'Torchlight'		PBR: received and accepted 2019, granted 2023	G. nivea x G. pteridifolia	
'Tucker Time Entrée'		PBR	G. rosmarinifolia × G. alpina	
'Tyalge Glow'		ACRA, 1990	G. speciosa × G.'Poorinda Firebird'	
'Wakiti Gem'		ACRA: received 1983	G. tetragonoloba × G. × gaudichaudii.	
'Wattlebird Yellow'		PBR: received and accepted 2001, granted 2006	G. 'Misty Pink' x G. 'Honey Gem'	
'Waverley Ghost'		ACRA: received 1984	Variegated sport of Grevillea 'Poorinda Constance'. Selected 1979.	
'White Knight'		PBR: received and accepted 2013, granted 2016		
'White Wings'			G. curviloba subsp. incurva x ?	
'Winpara Gem'		ACRA, 1984	G. thelemanniana x G. olivacea	photo
'Winpara Gold'		ACRA, 1988	G. preisii x G olivacea	photo
'Winter Delight'			G. lanigera x G. lavandulacea	
'Winter Flame'		PBR: received and accepted 2016, granted 2021	G. 'Bonnie Prince Charlie' x G. 'Fireworks'	
'Winter Nectar'		PBR: received and accepted 2018, granted 2021	Seedling selection of G. 'Honeyeater Heaven'	
'Winter Sparkles'		ACRA, 1991	Grevillea banksii x G. pteridifolia	photo
'Winter Wonder'		PBR: received 2015, accepted 2016, granted 2017	G. lanigera 'Tamboritha' x G. lanigera 'Warly Range'	
'Woori Wanderer'		ACRA: accepted 2008	G.laurifolia x G. acanthifolia. Selected 1990.	photos
'Yamba Sunshine'				
'Yarralumla Gem'			see 'Scarlet Sprite'	

== See also ==
- Lists of cultivars
- Ornamental plant
