= Grevillea 'Red Hooks' =

Flowering plant cultivar

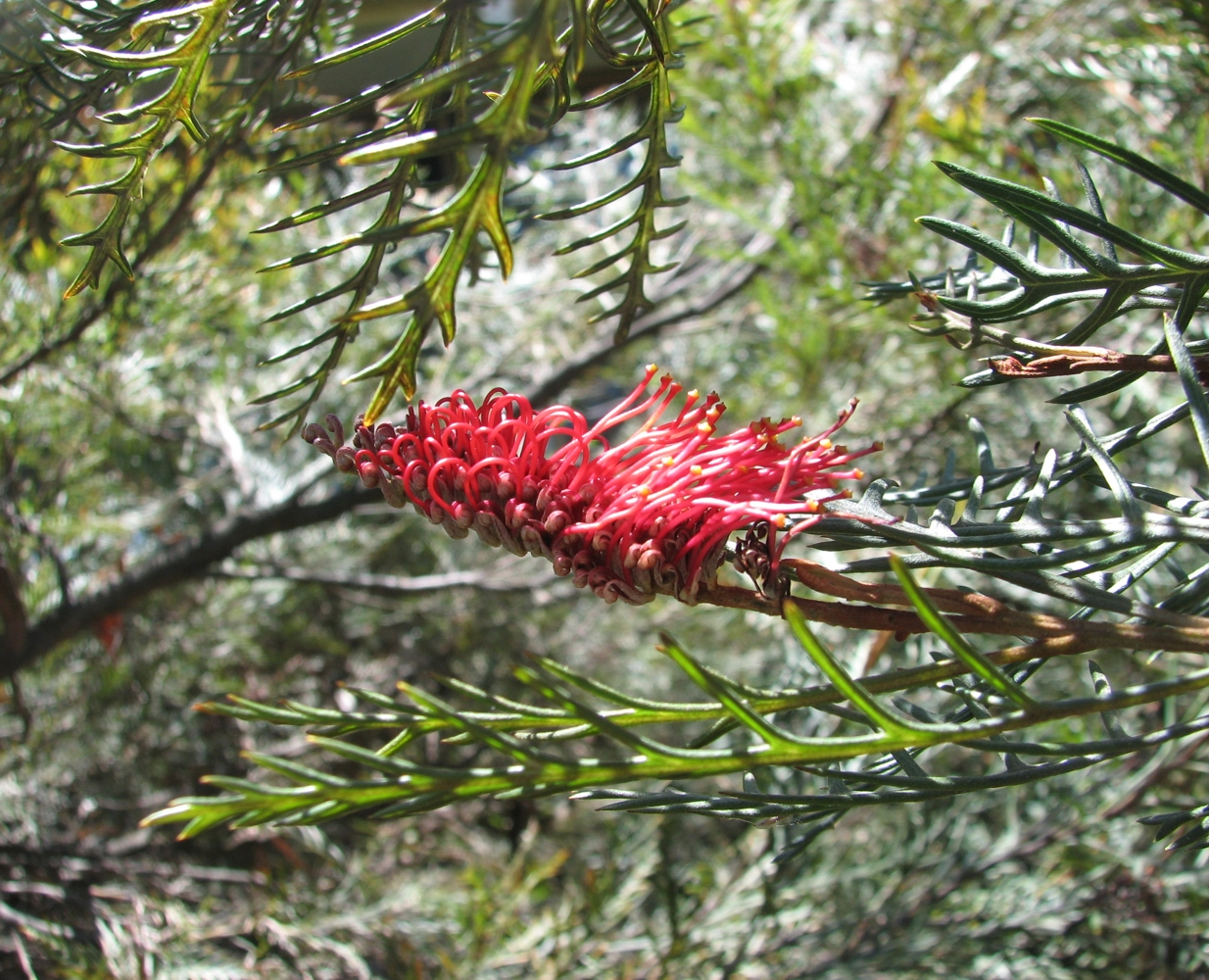
- Genus: Grevillea
- Hybrid parentage: Grevillea tetragonoloba × Grevillea hookeriana
- Cultivar: 'Red Hooks'

Grevillea 'Red Hooks' is a grevillea cultivar from Australia. It is a shrub that grows to 3 metres in height and 4 to 5 metres in width and has pinnate leaves with narrow-linear lobes. The inflorescences comprise greyish-green perianths and red styles which bend backwards. After being grown for many years under the misnomers Grevillea hookeriana or Grevillea hookerana, the cultivar was registered in 1987 under the name 'Red Hooks'. It is thought to be a hybrid of G. longifolia x G. tetragonoloba.

== See also ==
- List of Grevillea cultivars
