= Grevillea 'Fire Sprite' =

Flowering plant cultivar

- Hybrid parentage: Grevillea longistyla × Grevillea venusta
- Cultivar: 'Fire Sprite'
- Origin: Selected in Queensland

Grevillea 'Fire Sprite' is a grevillea cultivar. It is a cross between G. longistyla and G. venusta. First developed in 1996, it was registered with the Australian Cultivar Registration Authority (ACRA) in 2007. It has a shrubby habit, reaching 3 m (10 ft) high and 5 m (15 ft) wide.

Original developer Merv Hodge has been impressed by its long flowering period, its reliability, and its ability to attract birds to the garden. He reports brown honeyeaters, scarlet honeyeaters and eastern spinebills as visitors. It has remained popular after release.

== See also ==
- List of Grevillea cultivars
