= Grevillea 'Honey Gem' =

Flowering plant cultivar

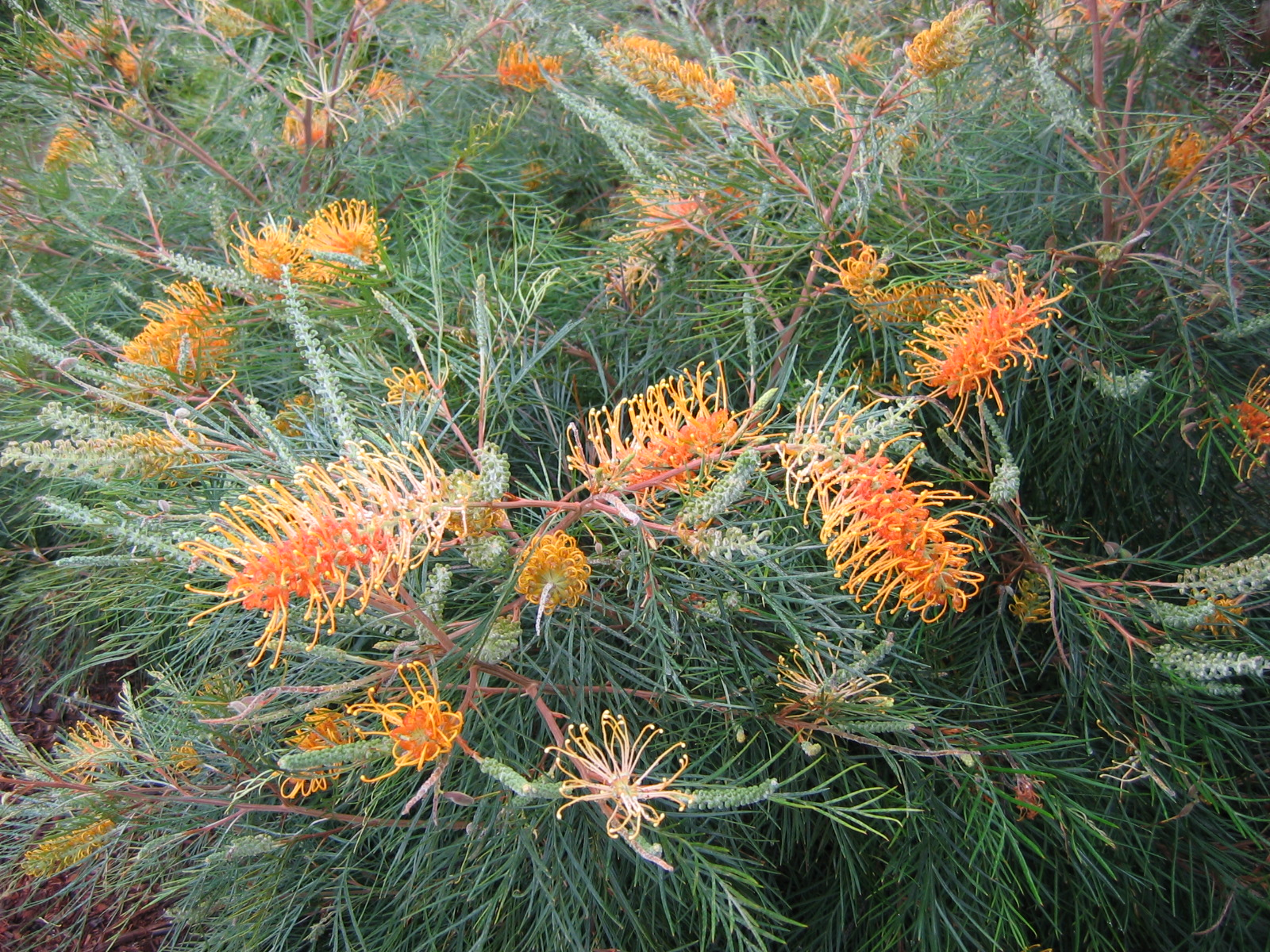
- Hybrid parentage: Grevillea banksii × Grevillea pteridifolia
- Cultivar: 'Honey Gem'
- Origin: Selected by Cherrel Jerks in Taringa, Queensland.

Grevillea 'Honey Gem' is a grevillea cultivar originating from Queensland in Australia.

It is a shrub that grows up to 6 m (20 ft) in height and has deeply divided dark green leaves that are approximately 29 cm (11 in) long and 24 cm (9 in) wide The inflorescences are yellowish orange racemes that are about 16 cm (6 in) long and 8 cm (3 in) wide. Flowers occur mainly in winter and spring.

The cultivar is a cross between Grevillea banksii (red form) and Grevillea pteridifolia. The original plant was obtained as a seedling of Grevillea pteridifolia by Cherrel Jerks of Taringa in Brisbane, Queensland.

It is a very vigorous cultivar and reliable in most gardens, though it flowers for only 6 months of the year or so. Needing a well-drained soil, it is otherwise vulnerable to 'collar rot'.

== See also ==
- List of Grevillea cultivars
