= Grevillea 'Molly' =

Flowering plant cultivar

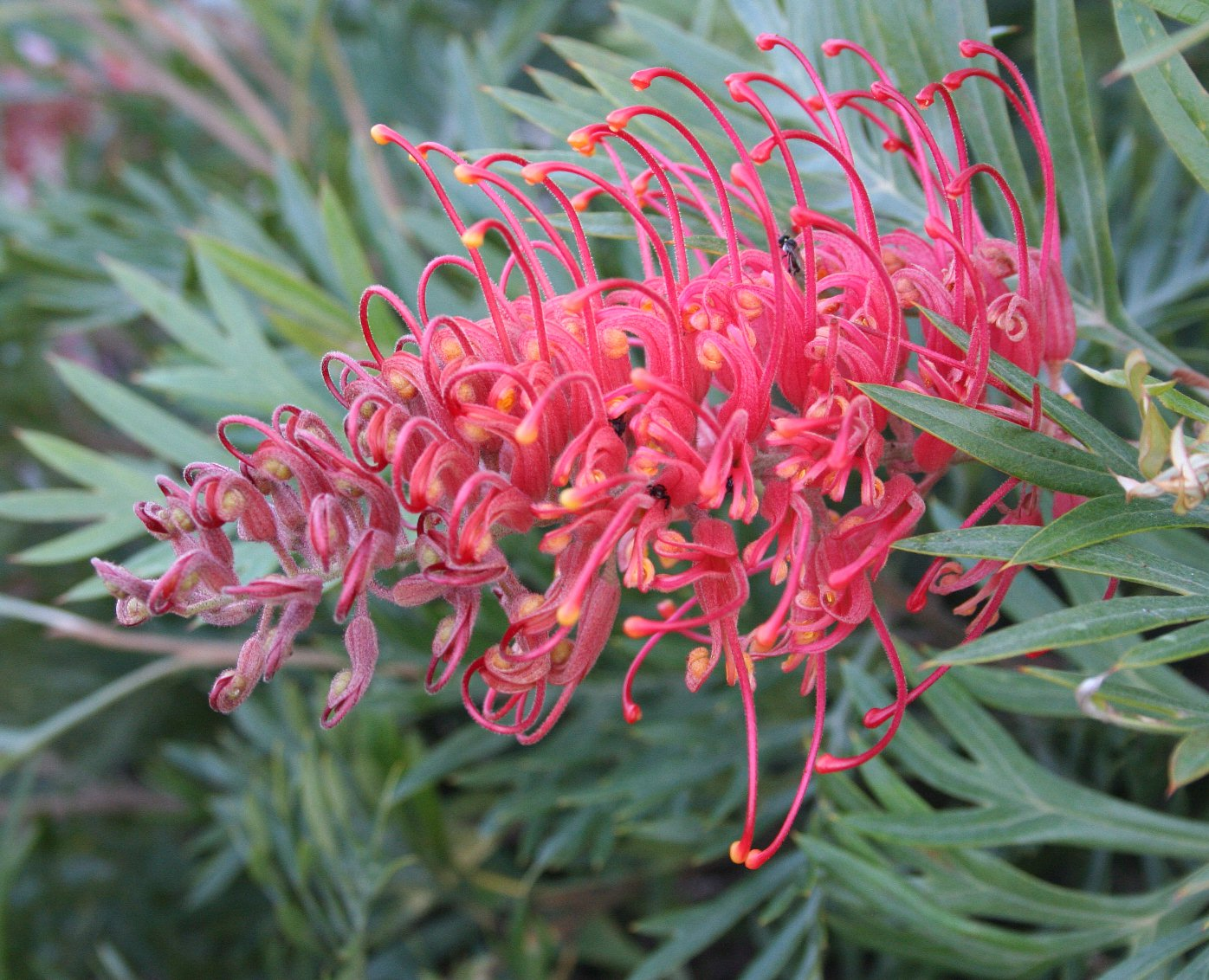
- 'Molly' in flower, Oakdale, NSW
- Hybrid parentage: Grevillea aurea × Grevillea bipinnatifida
- Cultivar: 'Molly'
- Origin: Selected in Queensland

Grevillea 'Molly' is a grevillea cultivar first made available to the public in 2003. It is a cross between G. aurea and G. bipinnatifida, chosen from seedlings which were bred by Owen Brown of Golden Beach, Queensland in 1997.

It is a dense shrub that grows to 1–3 m (3–10 ft) high. It has deeply divided yellow-green leaves, around 15 centimetres (5.9 in) long by 15 centimetres (5.9 in) wide. Prominently displayed above the foliage, the deep pink inflorescences resemble those of G. 'Robyn Gordon'.

== See also ==
- List of Grevillea cultivars
