= Grevillea 'Moonlight' =

Flowering plant cultivar

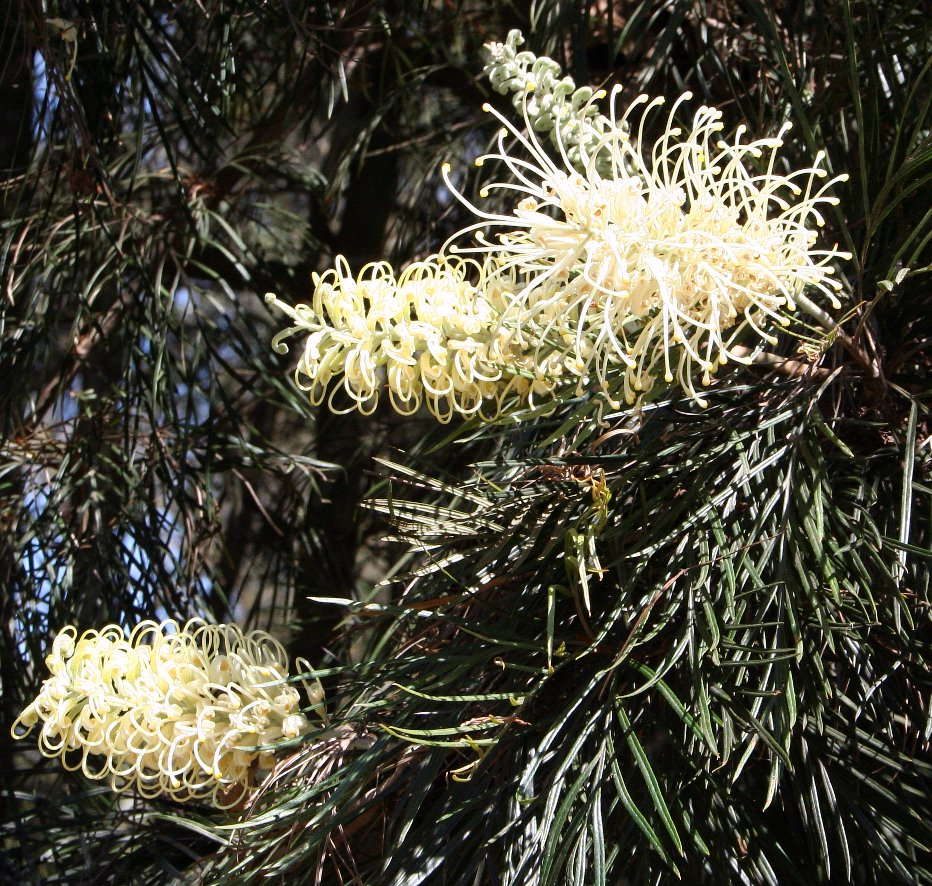
- 'Moonlight' in flower, Hunter Region Botanic Gardens
- Hybrid parentage: Grevillea whiteana selected form
- Cultivar: 'Moonlight'
- Origin: Selected in Queensland

Grevillea 'Moonlight' is a widely cultivated and popular garden plant in Australian gardens and amenities.

== Description and history ==
Grevillea moonlight was a selected form of the Queensland species Grevillea whiteana, although this has been questioned because of the difference in appearance to the parent plant. A hybrid between a white-flowered form of Grevillea banksii and the previous plant has been proposed. It is an upright woody shrub which may reach 4 m (13 ft) high by 1.5 m (5 ft) wide. It has deeply divided dark green fern-like leaves that are approximately 20 cm (8 in) long. The inflorescences are creamy white racemes that are up to 25 cm (10 in) long, and may occur year-round.

Highly regarded by celebrity gardener Don Burke among others, it has been widely used in gardens and amenities plantings around Australia, where it thrives in a well-drained sunny position. It is tolerant of humidity and frost. As with all cultivars, propagation is by cuttings, though this can be difficult. Heavy pruning may be required to keep it from getting top-heavy as well as promoting a dense habit.

It has also been used in the cut flower industry to some extent, as well as proposed as a suitable plant for street plantings.

== See also ==
- List of Grevillea cultivars
