= Grevillea nivea =

Conservation status
- Priority Two — Poorly Known Taxa (DEC)

Scientific classification
- Kingdom: Plantae
- Clade: Tracheophytes
- Clade: Angiosperms
- Clade: Eudicots
- Order: Proteales
- Family: Proteaceae
- Genus: Grevillea
- Species: G. nivea

Binomial name
- Grevillea nivea Olde & Marriott

Species of shrub endemic to Western Australia

Grevillea nivea is a species of flowering plant in the family Proteaceae and is endemic to the south of Western Australia. It is a dense shrub with spreading to ascending branches, crowded, divided leaves, the end lobes linear, and dense clusters of red flowers.

== Description ==
Grevillea nivea is a dense shrub that typically grows to 1.5–2.5 m (4 ft 11 in – 8 ft 2 in) high and 2–4 m (6 ft 7 in – 13 ft 1 in) wide with spreading to erect branches. The leaves are erect, 45–58 mm (1.8–2.3 in) long and deeply divided with nine to fifteen lobes 15–45 mm (0.59–1.77 in) long, the lobes sometimes further divided, the end lobes linear, 4–25 mm (0.16–0.98 in) long, 01.5–1.8 mm (0.059–0.071 in) wide with the edges rolled under, enclosing most of the lower surface. The flowers are arranged on or near the ends of branches, in clusters 80–105 mm (3.1–4.1 in) long on one side of the rachis, the clusters sometimes branched, the flowers red to dark red, and the pistil 22–24.5 mm (0.87–0.96 in) long. Flowering occurs in spring and the fruit is a follicle 14–17 mm (0.55–0.67 in) long.

== Taxonomy ==
Grevillea nivea was first formally described in 2009 by Peter M. Olde and Neil R. Marriott in the journal Nuytsia from specimens collected near Doubtful Island Bay in 1999. The specific epithet (nivea) means "snow-white", referring to the hairy covering on the branchlets, flowers and floral rachis.

== Distribution and habitat ==
This grevillea grows in low, windswept heath among granite rocks close to the coast near Bremer Bay in the Esperance Plains bioregion of southern Western Australia.

== Conservation status ==
Grevillea nivea is listed as "Priority Two" by the Western Australian Government Department of Biodiversity, Conservation and Attractions, meaning that it is poorly known and from only one or a few locations.

== See also ==
- List of Grevillea species
