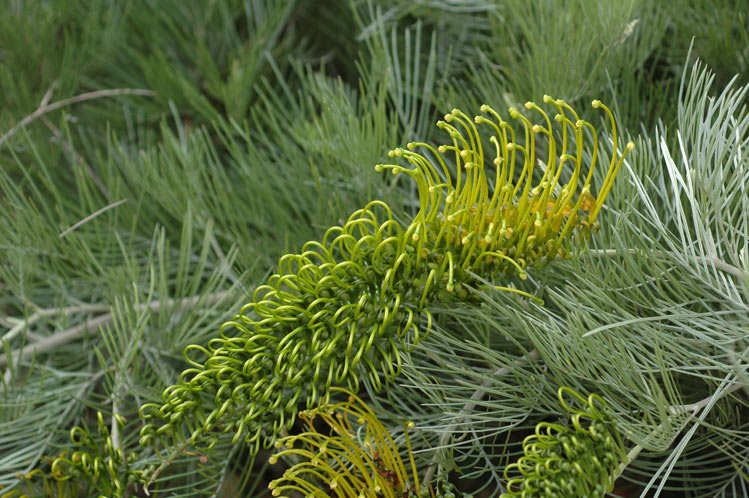
- In Mount Annan Botanic Garden

Conservation status
- Least Concern (IUCN 3.1)

Scientific classification
- Kingdom: Plantae
- Clade: Embryophytes
- Clade: Tracheophytes
- Clade: Spermatophytes
- Clade: Angiosperms
- Clade: Eudicots
- Order: Proteales
- Family: Proteaceae
- Genus: Grevillea
- Species: G. formosa

Binomial name
- Grevillea formosa McGill.

= Grevillea formosa =

Species of shrub endemic to Australia

Grevillea formosa, also known as the Mount Brockman grevillea, is a species of flowering plant in the family Proteaceae and is endemic to Arnhem Land in the Northern Territory. It is a prostrate to sprawling shrub with deeply divided leaves, the lobes sometimes further divided, the end leaflets linear, and green flowers that turn bright golden-yellow.

== Description ==
Grevillea formosa is a sprawling shrub that typically grows to a height of up to 1 m (3 ft 3 in), with trailing branches up to 2 m (6 ft 7 in) long. Its leaves are divided, 60–180 mm (2.4–7.1 in) long with 5 to 26 erect, linear leaflets, sometimes further divided, the end lobes 30–90 mm (1.2–3.5 in) long and 0.5–1.0 mm (0.020–0.039 in) wide. The edges of the leaflets are rolled under, but are not sharply-pointed. The flowers are arranged in toothbrush-like clusters along a rachis 120–300 mm (4.7–11.8 in) long. The flowers are green, turning bright golden-yellow as they age, the pistil 54–60 mm (2.1–2.4 in) long. Flowering occurs from January to March and the fruit is a shaggy-hairy follicle 11–16 mm (0.43–0.63 in) long.

== Taxonomy ==
Grevillea formosa was first formally described in 1986 by Donald McGillivray in his book New Names in Grevillea (Proteaceae), based on specimens collected in 1973. The specific epithet (formosa) means "beautifully-formed".

== Distribution and habitat ==
This grevillea grows in rocky places in the Pine Creek and Arnhem Plateau bioregions of western Arnhem Land.

== Conservation status ==
Grevillea formosa is listed as least concern on the IUCN Red List of Threatened Species and under the Northern Territory Government Territory Parks and Wildlife Conservation Act. Despite the species' restricted distribution, the population appears stable and there are no major threats affecting it at present or in the near future. No direct conservation measures are required for this species.
