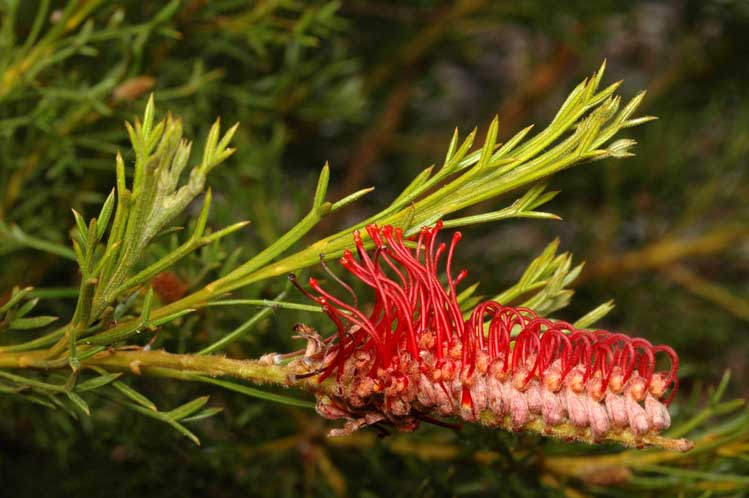

Conservation status
- Endangered (IUCN 3.1)

- Priority Four — Rare Taxa (DEC)

Scientific classification
- Kingdom: Plantae
- Clade: Embryophytes
- Clade: Tracheophytes
- Clade: Spermatophytes
- Clade: Angiosperms
- Clade: Eudicots
- Order: Proteales
- Family: Proteaceae
- Genus: Grevillea
- Species: G. fastigiata

Binomial name
- Grevillea fastigiata Olde & Marriott

= Grevillea fastigiata =

Species of shrub endemic to Western Australia

Grevillea fastigiata is a species of flowering plant in the family Proteaceae and is endemic to the south-west of Western Australia. It is an erect shrub with clustered branches, linear leaves sometimes with rigid lobes near the tip, and clusters of brownish or scarlet flowers.

== Description ==
Grevillea fastigiata is an erect shrub, typically 2.0–2.5 m (6 ft 7 in – 8 ft 2 in) high with clustered branches. The leaves are linear, 18–45 mm (0.71–1.77 in) long, sometimes with three to seven rigid, sharply-pointed, linear lobes 5–20 mm (0.20–0.79 in) long and 0.8–1.2 mm (0.031–0.047 in) long near the ends. The edges of the leaves are rolled under, obscuring most of the lower surface. The flowers are erect in toothbrush-like clusters along a rachis 45–80 mm (1.8–3.1 in) long. The flowers are pale brown to scarlet with an orange-red to scarlet style and the pistil is 19–22 mm (0.75–0.87 in) long. Flowering occurs from September to March and the fruit is a follicle about 10 mm (0.39 in) long.

== Taxonomy ==
Grevillea fastigiata was first formally described in 1994 by Peter M. Olde and Neil R. Marriott in The Grevillea Book from specimens collected by Olde east of Ravensthorpe. The specific epithet (fastigiata) means "fastigiate", referring to the branchlets.

== Distribution and habitat ==
This grevillea grows in mallee heath or shrubland in the upper catchment of the Jerdacuttup River in the Esperance Plains and Mallee biogeographic regions of south-western Western Australia.

== Conservation status ==
Grevillea fastigiata is listed as endangered on the IUCN Red List of Threatened Species. This grevillea has a severely restricted distribution, as it occurs in a single area with an estimated extent of occurrence of 260 km^{2} (100 sq mi). Its population size and the extent and quality of its habitat are in decline due to threats associated with mining, such as land clearing and associated infrastructure.

It is also listed as priority four by the Government of Western Australia Department of Biodiversity, Conservation and Attractions, meaning that it is rare or near threatened.
