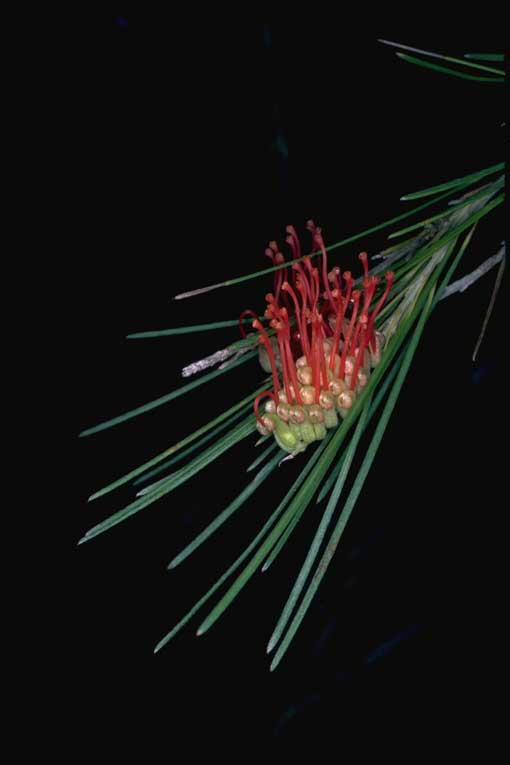

Conservation status
- Least Concern (IUCN 3.1)

- Priority Three — Poorly Known Taxa (DEC) (Subsp. lanata)

Scientific classification
- Kingdom: Plantae
- Clade: Embryophytes
- Clade: Tracheophytes
- Clade: Spermatophytes
- Clade: Angiosperms
- Clade: Eudicots
- Order: Proteales
- Family: Proteaceae
- Genus: Grevillea
- Species: G. coccinea

Binomial name
- Grevillea coccinea Meisn.

Subspecies
- Grevillea coccinea subsp. coccinea Meisn; Grevillea coccinea subsp. lanata Olde & Marriott

= Grevillea coccinea =

Species of shrub endemic to Western Australia

Grevillea coccinea is a species of flowering plant in the family Proteaceae and is endemic to the south of Western Australia. It is a low-lying or sprawling shrub with narrowly wedge-shaped to linear leaves and white, cream-coloured, and red or yellow flowers.

== Description ==
Grevillea coccinea is a low-lying or prostrate shrub that typically grows to a height of 0.7–3 m (2 ft 4 in – 9 ft 10 in). Its leaves are narrowly wedge-shaped to linear, 25–125 mm (0.98–4.92 in) long and 1.0–4.5 mm (0.039–0.177 in) wide. The edges of the leaves are rolled under, obscuring all but the lower mid-vein, and the tips are usually sharply-pointed. The flowers are arranged in groups in leaf axils on a rachis 25–65 mm (0.98–2.56 in) long and are white, cream-coloured, and red or yellow, the pistil 19–23.5 mm (0.75–0.93 in) long with a glabrous style. Flowering occurs from March to December and the fruit is a silky-hairy follicle 10.5–16 mm (0.41–0.63 in) long.

== Taxonomy ==
Grevillea coccinea was first formally described in 1855 by Carl Meissner in Hooker's Journal of Botany and Kew Garden Miscellany. The specific epithet (coccinea) means "scarlet".

In 1993, Peter M. Olde and Neil R. Marriott described two subspecies in the journal Nuytsia and the names are accepted by the Australian Plant Census:

- Grevillea coccinea Meisn subsp. coccinea has a perianth 2–3 mm (0.079–0.118 in) wide and covered with silky hairs;
- Grevillea coccinea subsp. lanata Olde & Marriott has a perianth 3.0–3.5 mm (0.12–0.14 in) wide and covered with woolly hairs.

== Distribution and habitat ==
This grevillea grows in shrub or heath and is found in southern Western Australia from Mount Manypeaks to near Hopetoun in the Esperance Plains and Mallee biogeographic regions of Western Australia. Subspecies lanata is confined to the Fitzgerald River National Park.

== Conservation status ==
This grevillea is listed as not threatened by the Department of Biodiversity, Conservation and Attractions, and as least concern on the IUCN Red List of Threatened Species.

Subspecies lanata is listed as priority three by the Government of Western Australia Department of Biodiversity, Conservation and Attractions, meaning that it is poorly known and known from only a few locations but is not under imminent threat.

== See also ==
- List of Grevillea species
