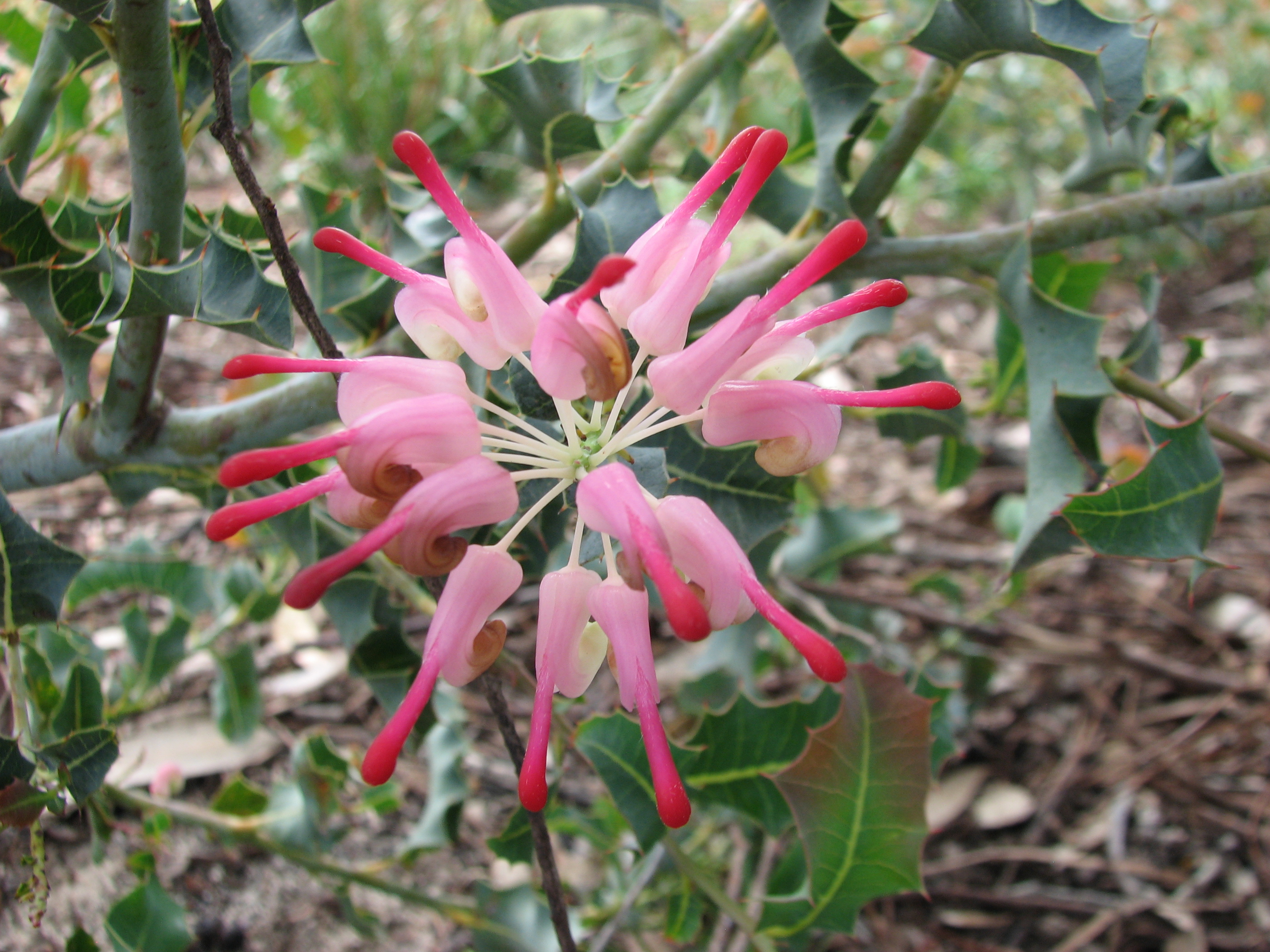
- Subspecies insignis in the Royal Botanic Gardens, Cranbourne
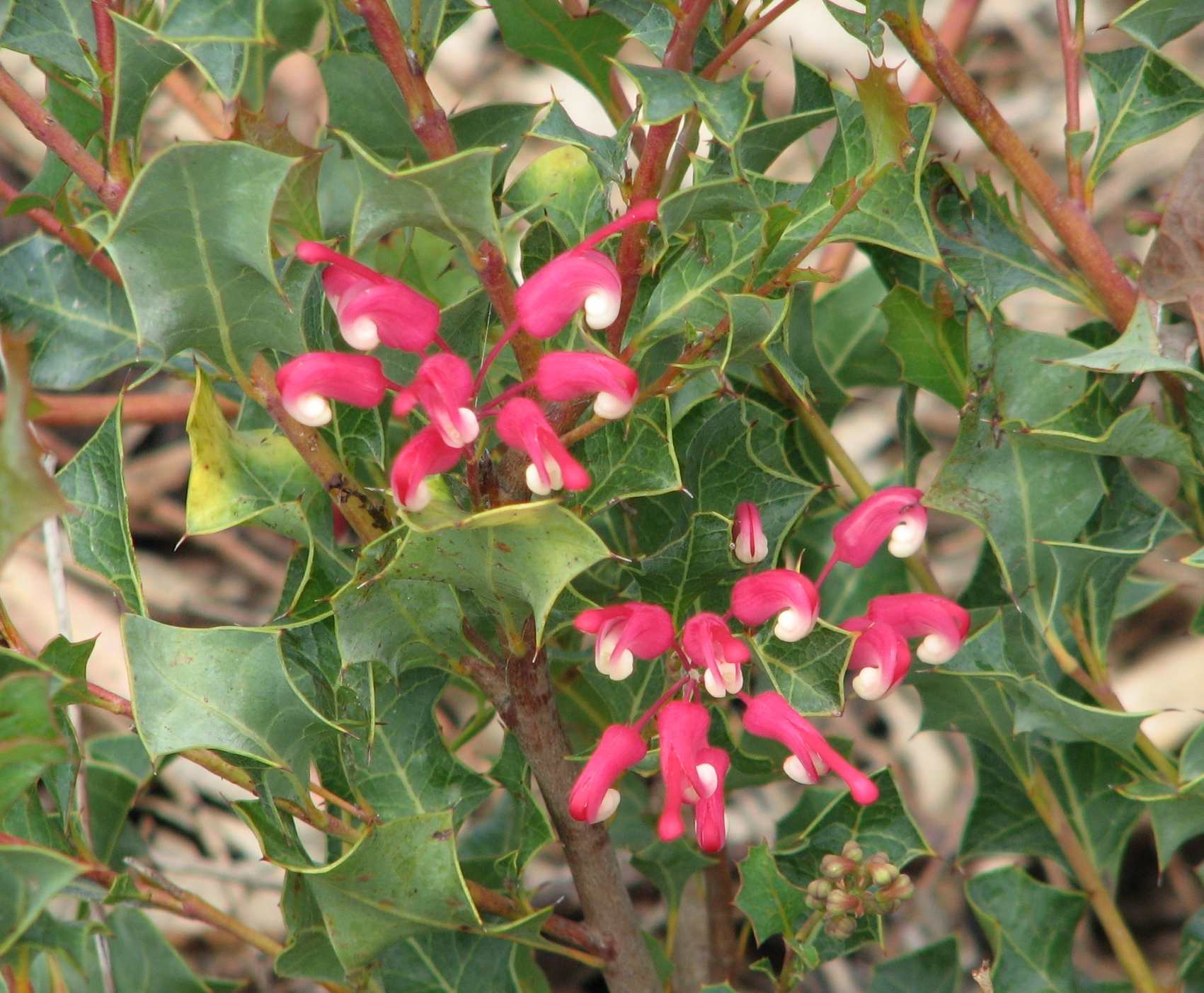
- Subspecies elliotii in the Royal Botanic Gardens, Cranbourne

Conservation status
- Endangered (IUCN 3.1)

Scientific classification
- Kingdom: Plantae
- Clade: Embryophytes
- Clade: Tracheophytes
- Clade: Angiosperms
- Clade: Eudicots
- Order: Proteales
- Family: Proteaceae
- Genus: Grevillea
- Species: G. insignis

Binomial name
- Grevillea insignis Kippist ex Meisn.

= Grevillea insignis =

Species of shrub endemic to Western Australia

Grevillea insignis, commonly known as wax grevillea, is a species of flowering plant in the family Proteaceae and is endemic to the south-west of Western Australia. It is an erect, bushy shrub with more or less oblong leaves with seven to seventeen sharply-pointed, triangular teeth, and more or less spherical or cylindrical clusters of cream-coloured flowers ageing to pink.

== Description ==
Grevillea insignis is an erect, bushy shrub that typically grows to a height of 1–4 m (3 ft 3 in – 13 ft 1 in). Its leaves are more or less oblong, 29–90 mm (1.1–3.5 in) long and 20–40 mm (0.79–1.57 in) wide with seven to seventeen sharply-pointed triangular teeth or lobes 3–8 mm (0.12–0.31 in) long and wide. The flowers are cream-coloured, ageing to pink and are arranged in more or less spherical to cylindrical, sometimes branched clusters on a rachis 10–25 mm (0.39–0.98 in) long. The pistil is 11–20 mm (0.43–0.79 in) long, and the ovary is densely shaggy-hairy. Flowering occurs from June to December and the fruit is an oblong follicle 10–14 mm (0.39–0.55 in) long.

== Taxonomy ==
Grevillea insignis was first formally described in 1855 by Carl Meissner in Hooker's Journal of Botany and Kew Garden Miscellany based on material collected by James Drummond. The specific epithet (insignis) means "remarkable" or "distinguished".

In 1993, In 1994 Peter M. Olde and Neil R. Marriott described two subspecies of G. insignis in the journal Nuytsia and the names are accepted by the Australian Plant Census:

- Grevillea insignis subsp. elliotii Olde & Marriott. differs from the autonym in having branchlets that are not glaucous and leaves with a wedge-shaped base with wider spaces between the lobes;
- Grevillea insignis Kippist ex Meisn. subsp. insignis has glaucous branchlets and leaves with narrow bases and narrow spaces between the lobes.

== Distribution and habitat ==
Subspecies elliotii grows in woodland and shrubland in a restricted area east of Varley and subsp. insignis grows in mallee and heathy shrubland between Tammin, Nyabing and Tarin Rock.

== Conservation status ==
Grevillea insignis is listed as 'Endangered' in the IUCN Red List.

Subspecies insignis is listed as 'Not Threatened' but subsp. elliotii is classified as 'Priority Three' by the Government of Western Australia Department of Biodiversity, Conservation and Attractions, meaning that it is poorly known and known from only a few locations but is not under imminent threat.
