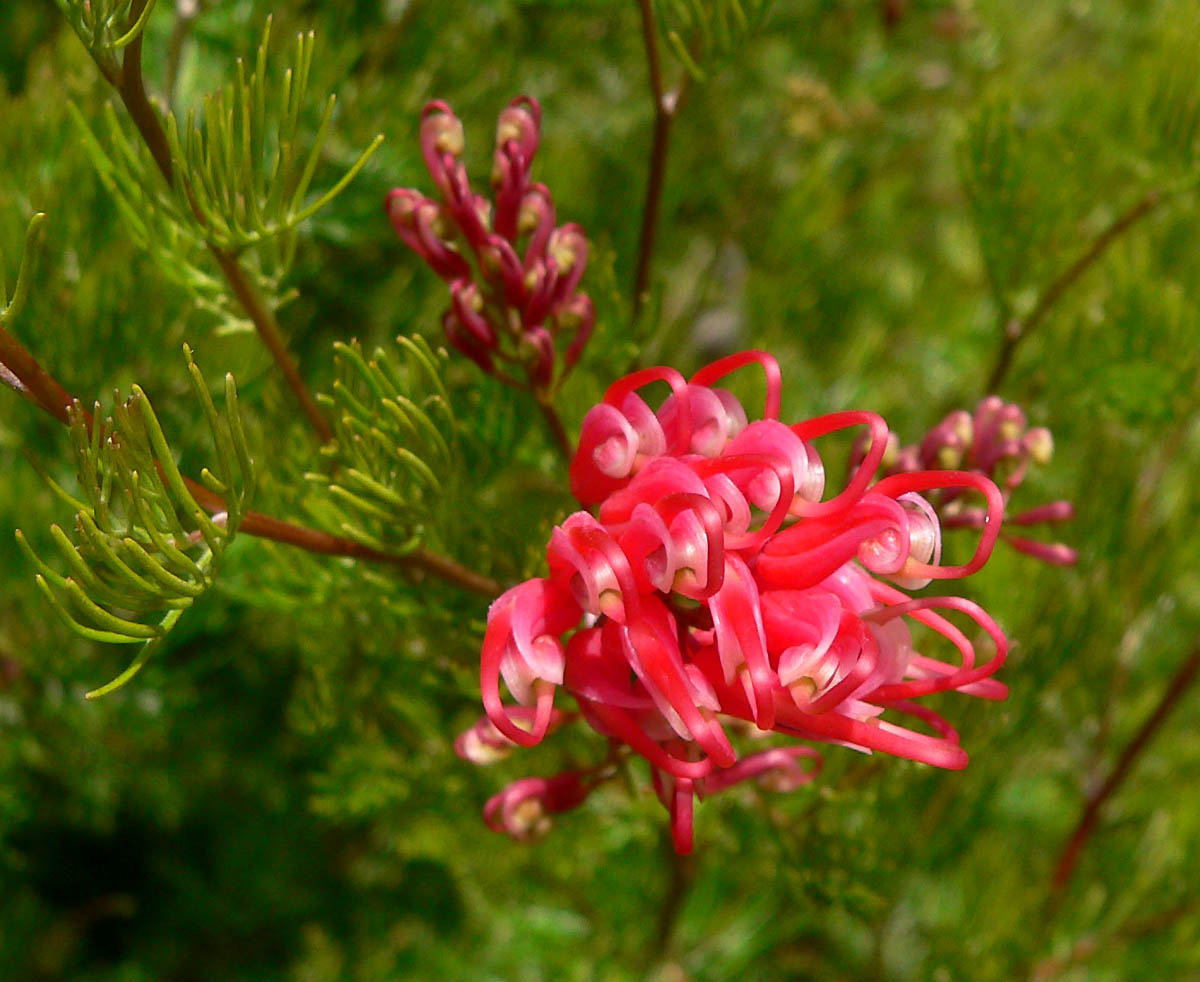
- In the San Francisco Botanical Garden

Conservation status
- Priority One — Poorly Known Taxa (DEC)

Scientific classification
- Kingdom: Plantae
- Clade: Embryophytes
- Clade: Tracheophytes
- Clade: Spermatophytes
- Clade: Angiosperms
- Clade: Eudicots
- Order: Proteales
- Family: Proteaceae
- Genus: Grevillea
- Species: G. fililoba

Binomial name
- Grevillea fililoba (McGill.) Olde & Marriott

Synonyms
- Grevillea thelemanniana subsp. fililoba McGill.

= Grevillea fililoba =

Species of shrub endemic to Western Australia

Grevillea fililoba is a species of flowering plant in the family Proteaceae and is endemic to a restricted area in the south-west of Western Australia. It is a spreading shrub with soft foliage, divided leaves with narrow linear lobes, and clusters of pink to bright red and white flowers.

== Description ==
Grevillea fililoba is a spreading shrub, typically up to about 1.5 m (4 ft 11 in) high and 3 m (9.8 ft) wide with soft, dense foliage. The leaves are 20–45 mm (0.79–1.77 in) long and divided, the lobes narrowly linear, sometimes curved, 2–20 mm (0.079–0.787 in) long and 0.3–0.7 mm (0.012–0.028 in) wide. The upper surface of the leaves is more or less glabrous, the edges rolled under obscuring most of the lower surface. The flowers are arranged in groups of twelve to thirty along a rachis 18–30 mm (0.71–1.18 in) long and are pink to bright red with a pink, green-tipped style, the pistil 24–28 mm (0.94–1.10 in) long. Flowering occurs from July to September and the fruit is a triangular follicle about 13 mm (0.51 in) long.

== Taxonomy ==
This grevillea was first formally described in 1986 by Donald McGillivray who gave it the name Grevillea thelemanniana subsp. fililoba in his New Names in Grevillea (Proteaceae) from specimens collected by Robert Royce in 1986. In 1994, Peter M. Olde and Neil R. Marriott raised the subspecies to species level as Grevillea fililoba in The Grevillea Book. The specific epithet (fililoba) means "thread-lobed".

== Distribution and habitat ==
This grevillea grows in a range of habitats and is found east of Geraldton in the catchments of the Greenough and Irwin Rivers in the Geraldton Sandplains biogeographic region of south-western Western Australia.

== Conservation status ==
Grevillea fililoba is listed as "Priority One" by the Government of Western Australia Department of Biodiversity, Conservation and Attractions, meaning that it is known from only one or a few locations which are potentially at risk.

== Use in horticulture ==
This grevillea is well known in cultivation, often by the cultivar names Grevillea 'Ellendale' or 'Ellendale Pool'. It is readily grown from seed or cuttings and grows best in well-drained soil in full sun, but is often short-lived in humid areas of eastern Australia.
