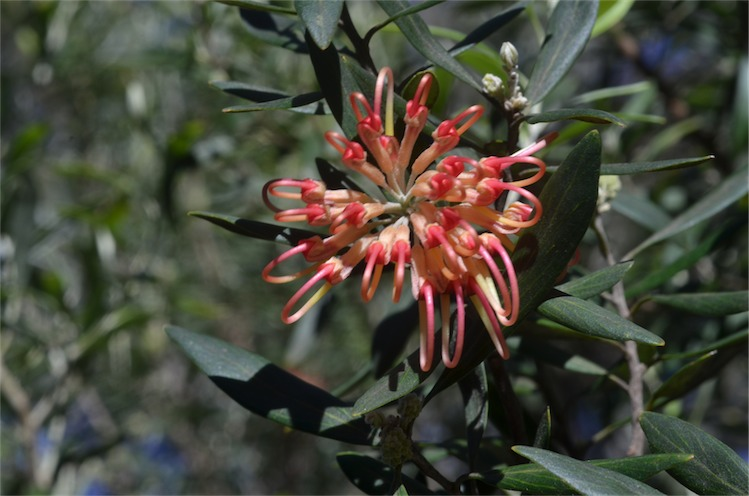
- In the Australian National Botanic Gardens

Conservation status
- Priority Four — Rare Taxa (DEC)

Scientific classification
- Kingdom: Plantae
- Clade: Embryophytes
- Clade: Tracheophytes
- Clade: Angiosperms
- Clade: Eudicots
- Order: Proteales
- Family: Proteaceae
- Genus: Grevillea
- Species: G. olivacea

Binomial name
- Grevillea olivacea A.S.George

= Grevillea olivacea =

Shrub endemic to Western Australia

Grevillea olivacea, commonly known as olive grevillea, is a species of flowering plant in the family Proteaceae and is endemic to the west coast of Western Australia. It is a dense, erect shrub with elliptic to egg-shaped leaves, and erect clusters of bright red and orange or yellow flowers with a red to yellow style.

== Description ==
Grevillea olivacea is a dense, erect shrub that typically grows to a height of 1–4.5 m (3 ft 3 in – 14 ft 9 in) and has silky-hairy branchlets. Its leaves are elliptic to egg-shaped with the narrower end towards the base, 30–68 mm (1.2–2.7 in) long and 5–17 mm (0.20–0.67 in) wide. The upper surface of the leaves is more or less glabrous and the lower surface is silky-hairy. The flowers are arranged in dense, umbel-like groups of 14 to 28 on a woolly-hairy rachis 4–8 mm (0.16–0.31 in) long. The flowers are bright red and orange or yellow and hairy on the outside, the pistil 22–30 mm (0.87–1.18 in) long with a red to yellow style. Flowering occurs from June to October and the fruit is an oblong to oval follicle 11–15 mm (0.43–0.59 in) long.

== Taxonomy ==
Grevillea olivacea was first formally described by Alex George in the journal Nuytsia from specimens collected on the mainland opposite Snag Island south of Dongara in 1966. The specific epithet (olivacea) refers to the leaf colour, resembling that of the olive (Olea europaea).

== Distribution and habitat ==
Olive grevillea grows in shrubland on calcareous sand over limestone in near coastal areas of Western Australia between Jurien Bay and Leeman in the Geraldton Sandplains and Swan Coastal Plain bioregions of south-western Western Australia.

== Conservation status ==
This grevillea is listed as "Priority Four" by the Government of Western Australia Department of Biodiversity, Conservation and Attractions, meaning that it is rare or near threatened.

== Use in horticulture ==
Grevillea olivacea is an ornamental but hardy plant, suitable for use in nature strips and parks and as an informal hedge. It grows well in all soil types provided the drainage is good. It responds well to pruning and is attractive to birds and insects.
