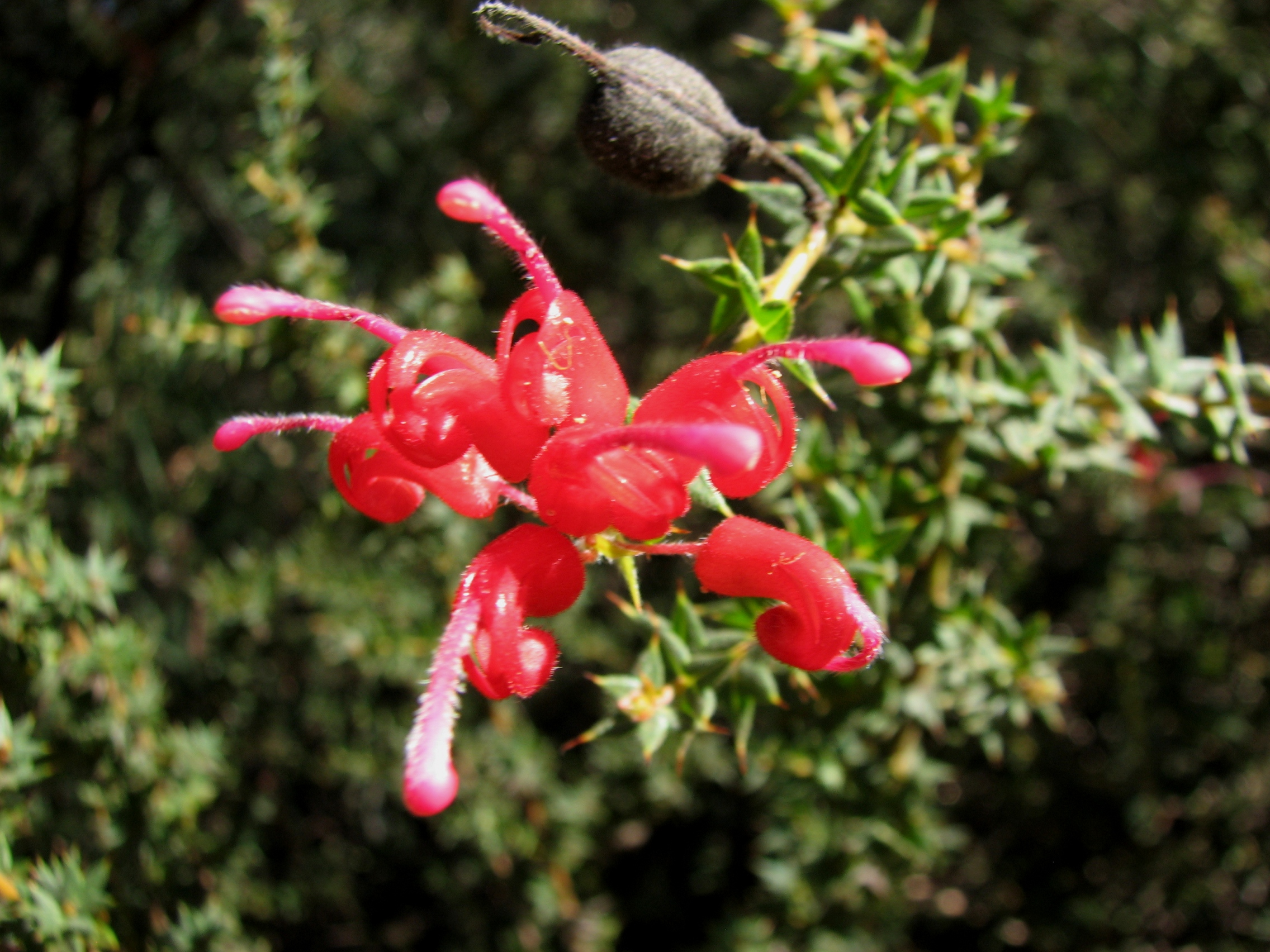
- In the Australian National Botanic Gardens

Conservation status
- Priority Four — Rare Taxa (DEC)

- Critically Endangered (IUCN 3.1)

Scientific classification
- Kingdom: Plantae
- Clade: Embryophytes
- Clade: Tracheophytes
- Clade: Spermatophytes
- Clade: Angiosperms
- Clade: Eudicots
- Order: Proteales
- Family: Proteaceae
- Genus: Grevillea
- Species: G. asteriscosa

Binomial name
- Grevillea asteriscosa Diels

= Grevillea asteriscosa =

Star-leaf grevillea

Species of shrub endemic to Australia

Grevillea asteriscosa, commonly known as star-leaf grevillea, is a species of flowering plant in the family Proteaceae and is endemic to the south-west of Western Australia. It is a shrub with widely-spreading branches, star-shaped leaves with sharply-pointed lobes, and bright red flowers.

== Description ==
Grevillea asteriscosa is a shrub with hairy, widely-spreading branches and that typically grows to a height of 0.3–2.6 m (1 ft 0 in – 8 ft 6 in). Its leaves are star-shaped 5–10 mm (0.20–0.39 in) long and 8–18 mm (0.31–0.71 in) wide with three to nine sharply-pointed triangular lobes. The flowers are arranged in groups of four to ten on the ends of branchlets on a rachis 1–3 mm (0.039–0.118 in) long and are bright red. The pistil is 15.5–19.5 mm (0.61–0.77 in) long and the ovary is covered with hairs flattened against the surface. Flowering occurs from May to November and the fruit is an oblong follicle 9–12 mm (0.35–0.47 in) long.

== Taxonomy ==
Grevillea asteriscola was formally described in 1904 by German botanist Ludwig Diels in Botanische Jahrbücher für Systematik, Pflanzengeschichte und Pflanzengeographie, based on plant material collected about 150 kilometres (93 mi) north of the Stirling Range. The specific epithet (asteriscosa) means "abounding in little stars".

== Distribution and habitat ==
Star-leaf grevillea grows in heath and scrub between Muntadgin, Pingaring and Bullaring in the Avon Wheatbelt and Mallee biogeographic regions of south-western Western Australia.

== Conservation status ==
This grevillea is listed as critically endangered on the IUCN Red List of Threatened Species due to a population decline of at least 80% over the past 60 years due to a combination of factors such as land clearing for agriculture and roads and the invasion of weeds. It is also listed as priority rour by the Government of Western Australia Department of Biodiversity, Conservation and Attractions, meaning that is rare or near threatened.
