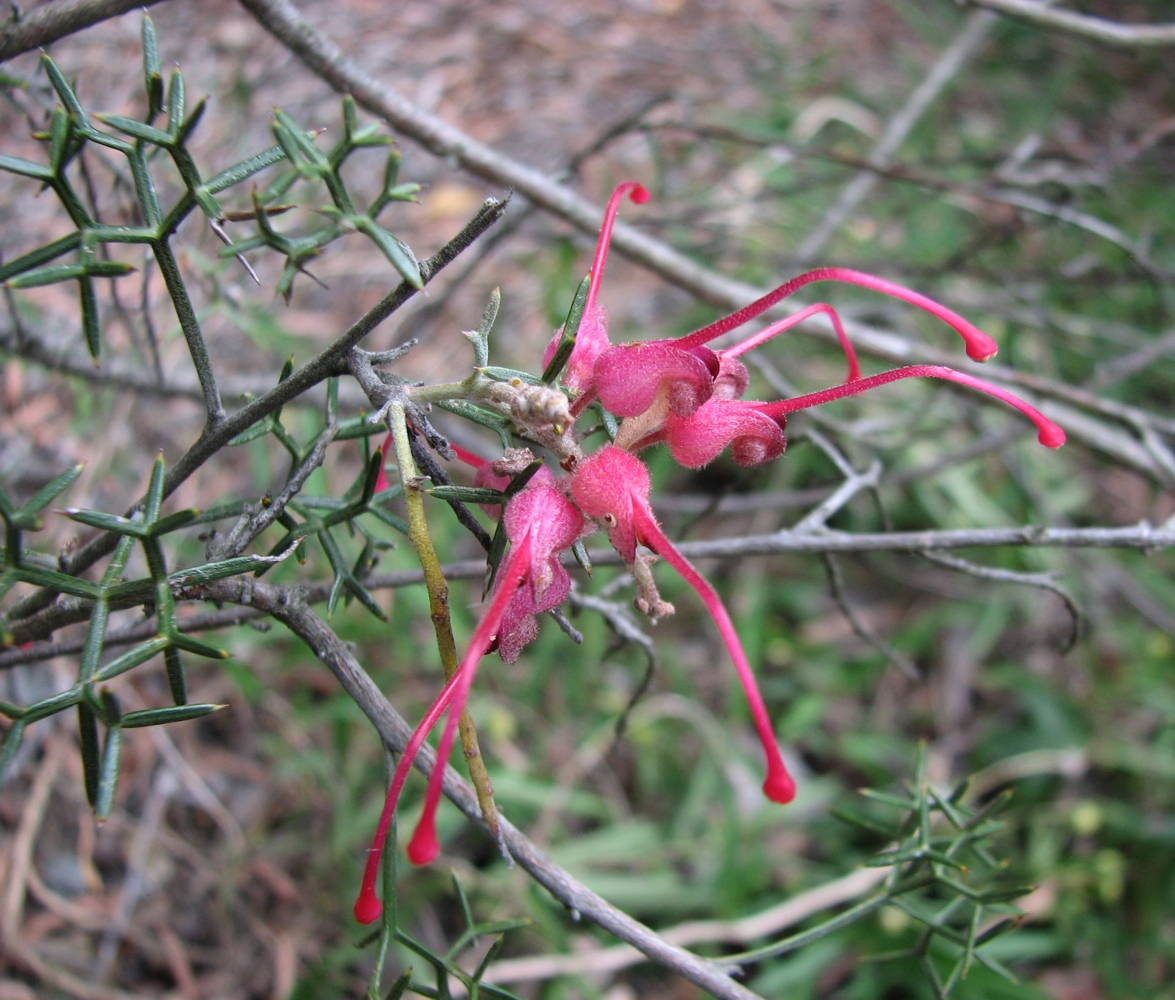
- In Maranoa Gardens

Conservation status
- Critically Endangered (IUCN 3.1)

- Priority Three — Poorly Known Taxa (DEC)

Scientific classification
- Kingdom: Plantae
- Clade: Embryophytes
- Clade: Tracheophytes
- Clade: Spermatophytes
- Clade: Angiosperms
- Clade: Eudicots
- Order: Proteales
- Family: Proteaceae
- Genus: Grevillea
- Species: G. asparagoides

Binomial name
- Grevillea asparagoides Meisn.

= Grevillea asparagoides =

Species of shrub endemic to of Western Australia

Grevillea asparagoides is a species of flowering plant in the family Proteaceae and is endemic to the south-west of Western Australia. It is dense, prickly shrub with deeply divided leaves, the end lobes linear and sharply pointed, and pink to reddish flowers with red styles.

== Description ==
Grevillea asparagoides is a dense, prickly shrub that typically grows to a height of 0.5–2 m (1 ft 8 in – 6 ft 7 in) and has hairy branchlets. Its leaves are 18–36 mm (0.71–1.42 in) long and have three to five lobes, each usually further divided, the end lobes linear or awl-shaped, sharply-pointed, 5–20 mm (0.20–0.79 in) long and 0.8–1.4 mm (0.031–0.055 in) wide with the edges rolled under. The flowers are arranged along a rachis 25–60 mm (0.98–2.36 in) long, and are pink to reddish-pink with a red style. The pistil is 30–37 mm (1.2–1.5 in) long with a sac-like perianth. Flowering occurs from July to December and the fruit is a follicle 13–17 mm (0.51–0.67 in) long.

== Taxonomy ==
Grevillea asparagoides was first formally described in 1856 by botanist Carl Meissner in de Candolle's Prodromus Systematis Naturalis Regni Vegetabilis from specimens collected by James Drummond in the Swan River Colony. The specific epithet (asparagoides) is derived from a passing resemblance of the foliage to that of asparagus.

== Distribution and habitat ==
This grevillea grows in heathland and shrubland in scattered populations between Perenjori, Wongan Hills and Bindi Bindi in the Avon Wheatbelt biogeographic region.

== Conservation status ==
Grevillea asparagoides is listed as critically endangered on the IUCN Red List of Threatened Species. This is due to a decline of at least 80% over the past 60 years (or 2 generational lengths for the species) caused by land clearing for agricultural purposes, road development and weed invasion. These threats are ongoing and the population of the species is still in decline.

It is also listed as priority three by the Government of Western Australia Department of Biodiversity, Conservation and Attractions, meaning that it is poorly known and known from only a few locations but is not under imminent threat.

== Use in horticulture ==
This species requires a well-drained soil and full sun. Propagation is from cuttings; grafting on the east coast of Australia may be required to ensure greater reliability.
