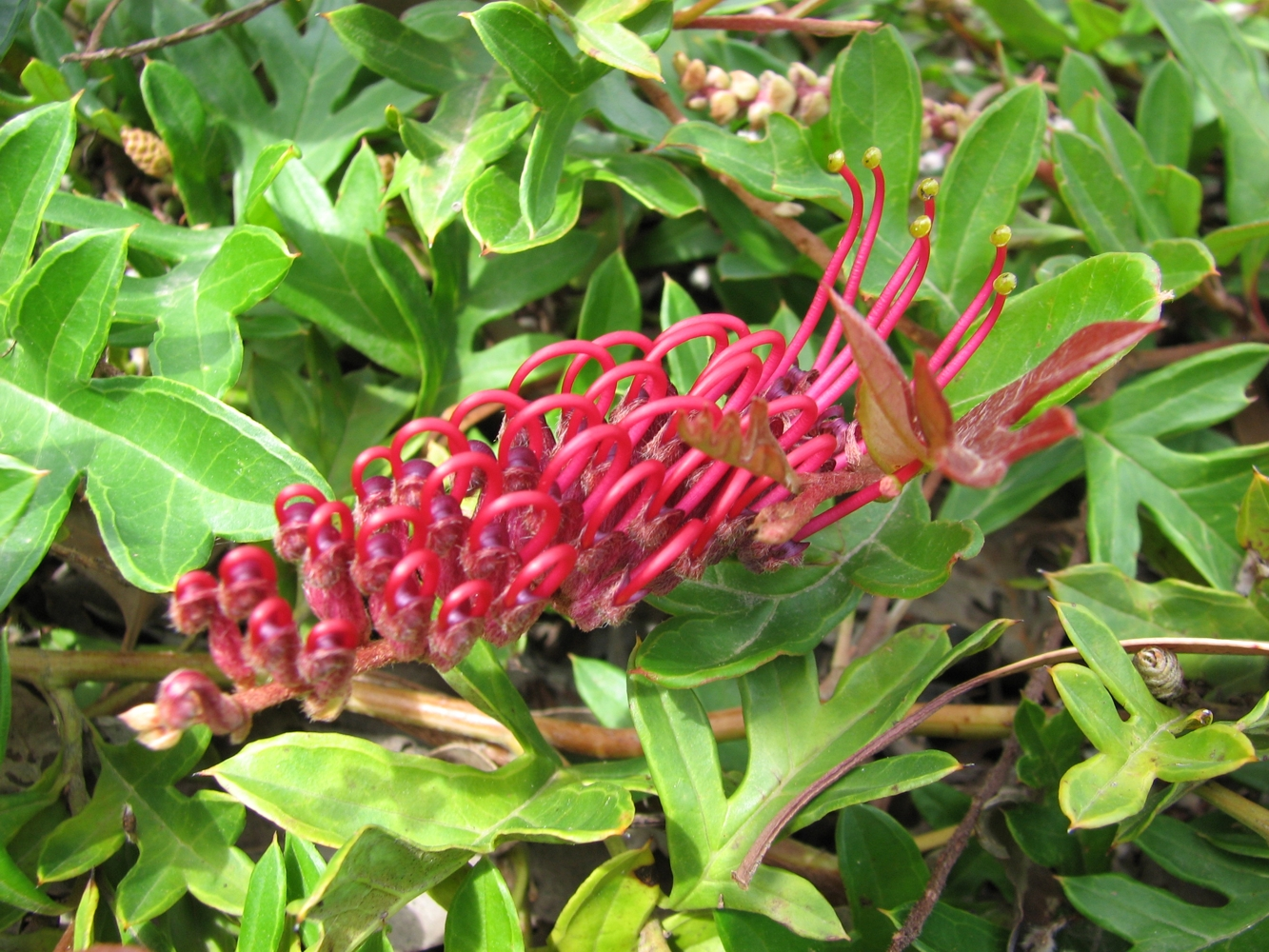
- In Royal Botanic Gardens, Cranbourne

Scientific classification
- Kingdom: Plantae
- Clade: Tracheophytes
- Clade: Angiosperms
- Clade: Eudicots
- Order: Proteales
- Family: Proteaceae
- Genus: Grevillea
- Species: G. × gaudichaudii

Binomial name
- Grevillea × gaudichaudii R.Br. ex Gaudich.

= Grevillea × gaudichaudii =

Species of shrub endemic to Australia

Grevillea × gaudichaudii is a hybrid species of flowering plant in the family Proteaceae and is endemic to a restricted area of New South Wales. It is a prostrate shrub with deeply lobed leaves and toothbrush-like groups of dark pink to burgundy-red flowers. The plant is a popular garden ground-cover.

== Description ==
Grevillea × gaudichaudii is a naturally occurring hybrid between Grevillea acanthifolia subsp. acanthifolia and Grevillea laurifolia, growing as a prostrate plant 2–3 m (6 ft 7 in – 9 ft 10 in) in diameter. Its leaves are pinnately-lobed, the lobes oblong to egg-shaped and softly-hairy on the lower surface but not sharply pointed. The flowers are arranged in toothbrush-like racemes less than 25 mm (0.98 in) long and are dark pink to burgundy-red, the style more than 20 mm (0.79 in) long and the ovary stalked and glabrous. Flowering occurs from October to December.

== Taxonomy ==
Grevillea × gaudichaudii was first formally described in 1827 by Charles Gaudichaud-Beaupré in Voyage autour du monde, entrepris par ordre du roi from an unpublished description by Robert Brown of plants collected in the Jamieson Valley (near Katoomba).

== Distribution and habitat ==
This grevillea grows in sandy soil and is restricted to parts of the higher Blue Mountains.

== Use in horticulture ==
A fast-growing ground cover, this grevillea is frost-resistant and tolerates most soil types, preferring sunny sites in well-drained soil. It can be grown from cuttings.
