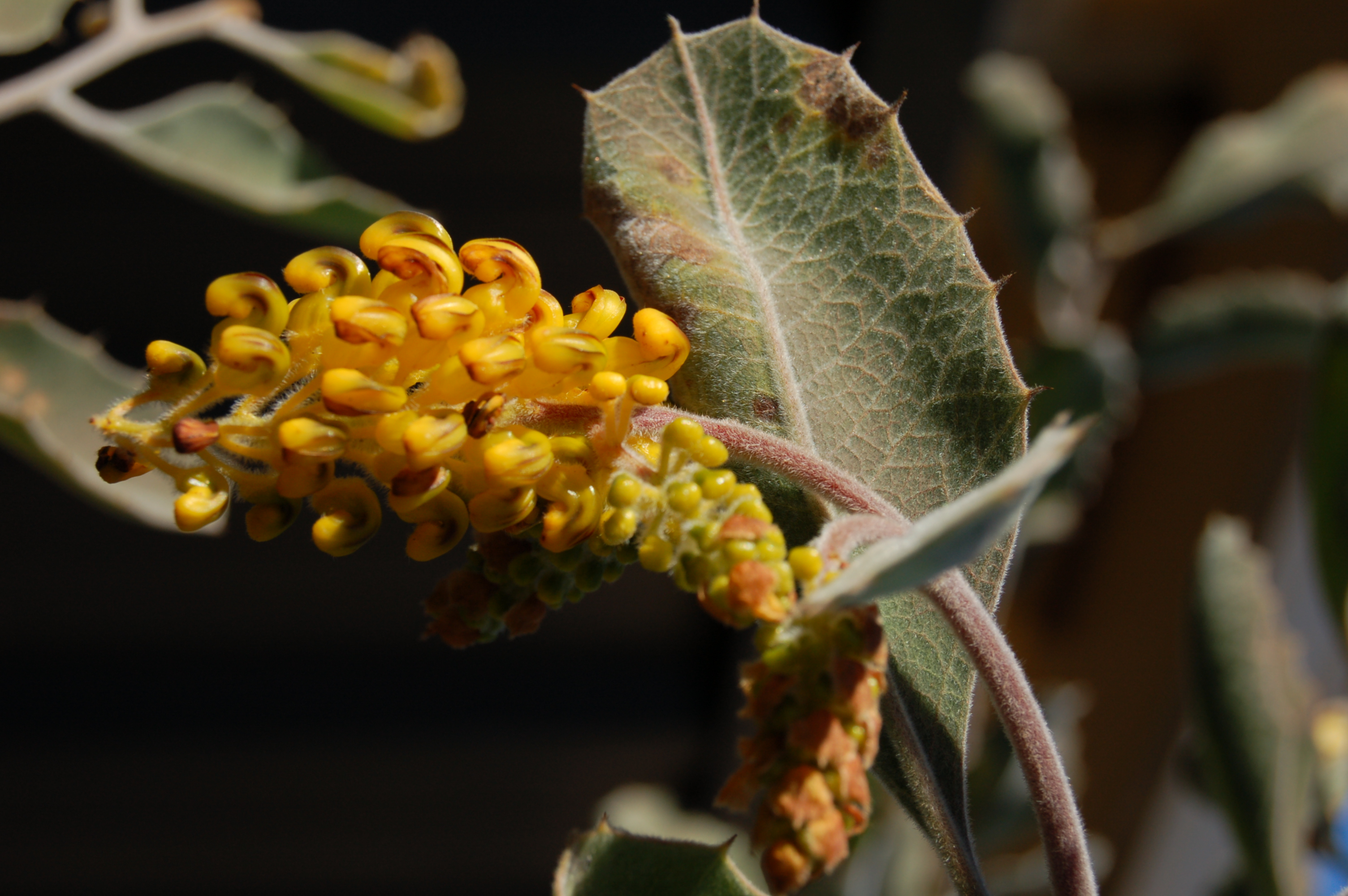

Conservation status
- Least Concern (IUCN 3.1)

- Priority Four — Rare Taxa (DEC)

Scientific classification
- Kingdom: Plantae
- Clade: Tracheophytes
- Clade: Angiosperms
- Clade: Eudicots
- Order: Proteales
- Family: Proteaceae
- Genus: Grevillea
- Species: G. miniata

Binomial name
- Grevillea miniata W.Fitzg.

= Grevillea miniata =

Species of shrub endemic to Australia

Grevillea miniata, commonly known as sandstone grevillea, is a species of flowering plant in the family Proteaceae and is endemic to north-western Australia. It is a spreading to erect shrub or small tree with more or less oblong leaves and bright yellow to orange and bright red flowers with a yellow style.

== Description ==
Grevillea miniata is a spreading to erect shrub or tree that typically grows to a height of 2–4 m (6 ft 7 in – 13 ft 1 in). Its leaves are more or less oblong, 45–150 mm (1.8–5.9 in) long and 30–70 mm (1.2–2.8 in) wide with 9 to 25, usually sharply pointed teeth. The lower surface of the leaves is covered with slightly felty hairs. The flowers are arranged in leaf axils in clusters on a rachis 30–50 mm (1.2–2.0 in) long and are bright yellow and deep green at first, later orange or deep yellow and bright red as the flowers open, the style yellow and the pistil 11–13.5 mm (0.43–0.53 in) long and hairy. Flowering occurs from April to August, and the fruit is an oblong to oval follicle 14–18 mm (0.55–0.71 in) long.

== Taxonomy ==
Grevillea miniata was first formally described in 1918 by William Vincent Fitzgerald in Journal and Proceedings of the Royal Society of Western Australia from specimens he collected in the Lady Forrest Range. The specific epithet (miniata) means "flame scarlet".

== Distribution and habitat ==
This grevillea grows in shrubland or woodland in rocky places or low hills from the southern end of the Wunaamin Miliwundi Ranges to the Bungle Bungle Range in Western Australia and scattered locations in the north of the Northern Territory.

== Conservation status ==
Grevillea miniata is listed as priority four by the Government of Western Australia Department of Biodiversity, Conservation and Attractions, meaning that it is rare or near threatened.
