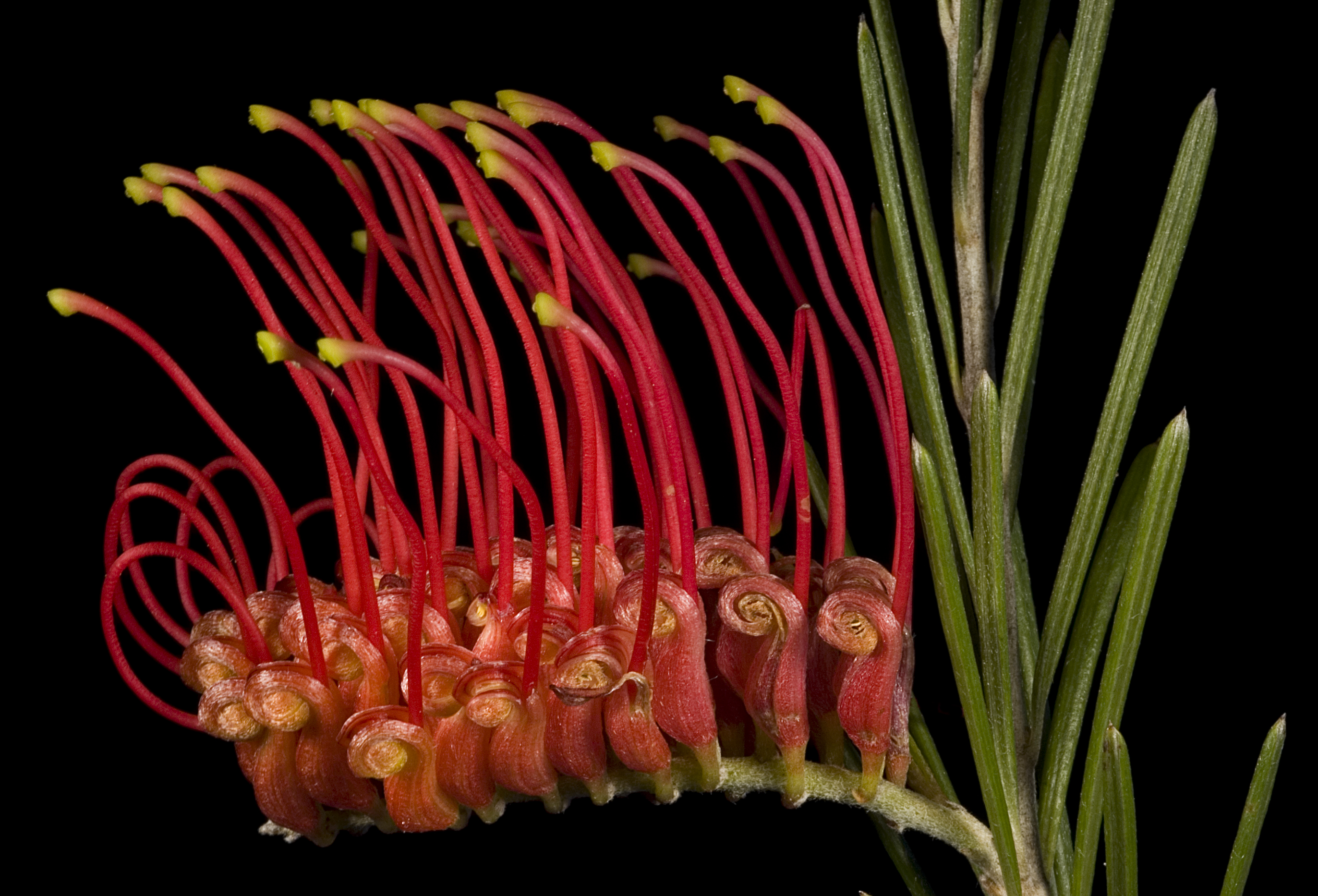

Conservation status
- Least Concern (IUCN 3.1)

Scientific classification
- Kingdom: Plantae
- Clade: Embryophytes
- Clade: Tracheophytes
- Clade: Spermatophytes
- Clade: Angiosperms
- Clade: Eudicots
- Order: Proteales
- Family: Proteaceae
- Genus: Grevillea
- Species: G. beardiana

Binomial name
- Grevillea beardiana McGill.

= Grevillea beardiana =

Red combs

Species of shrub native to Western Australia

Grevillea beardiana, commonly known as red combs, is a species of flowering plant in the family Proteaceae and is endemic to the south-west of Western Australia. It is a shrub with linear to narrowly wedge-shaped leaves and bright red or orange flowers.

== Description ==
Grevillea beardiana is a spreading shrub that typically grows to a height of 0.3–1.5 m (1 ft 0 in – 4 ft 11 in). Its leaves are linear to narrowly wedge-shaped, 10–55 mm (0.39–2.17 in) long and 0.7–2.0 mm (0.028–0.079 in) wide, sometimes also with a few pinnate or tripinnate leaves. The edges of the leaves are rolled under. The flowers are arranged in one-sided racemes, the rachis 18–45 mm (0.71–1.77 in) long. The flowers, including the style are bright red to orange, the style glabrous with a green to pale red tip, the pistil 28–31.5 mm (1.10–1.24 in) long. Flowering mainly occurs from September to December and the fruit is a woolly-hairy follicle 7.5–11.5 mm (0.30–0.45 in) long.

== Taxonomy ==
Grevillea beardiana was first formally described in 1986 by Donald McGillivray in his book New Names in Grevillea (Proteaceae), based on specimens collected in 1962 by John Stanley Beard near Newdegate. The specific epithet (beardiana) honours the collector of the type specimens.

== Distribution and habitat ==
Red combs grows in heathland in sandy and granitic soils, and occurs between Newdegate, Salmon Gums and Lake Johnston in the Coolgardie, Esperance Plains and Mallee biogeographic regions of south-western Western Australia.

== Conservation status ==
Grevillea beadleana is listed as not threatened by the Government of Western Australia Department of Biodiversity, Conservation and Attractions and as least concern on the IUCN Red List of Threatened Species.
