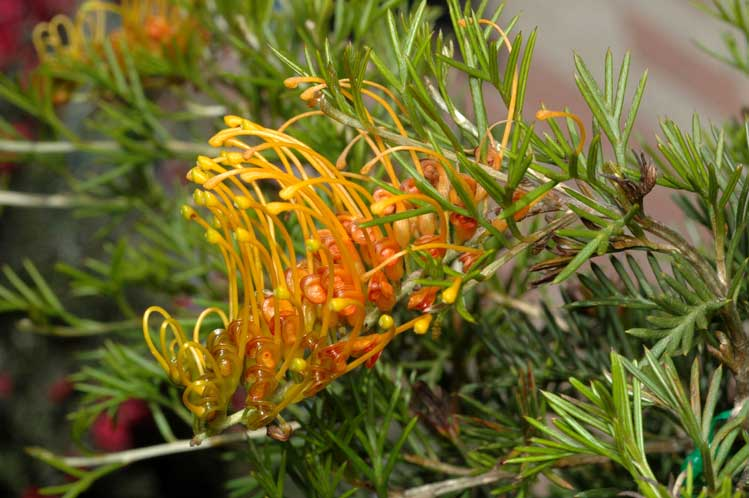

Conservation status
- Priority Three — Poorly Known Taxa (DEC)

- Critically Endangered (IUCN 3.1)

Scientific classification
- Kingdom: Plantae
- Clade: Tracheophytes
- Clade: Angiosperms
- Clade: Eudicots
- Order: Proteales
- Family: Proteaceae
- Genus: Grevillea
- Species: G. tenuiloba

Binomial name
- Grevillea tenuiloba C.A.Gardner

= Grevillea tenuiloba =

Species of shrub endemic to Western Australia

Grevillea tenuiloba, commonly known as amber grevillea, is a species of flowering plant in the family Proteaceae and is endemic to the south-west of Western Australia. It is a low, spreading shrub with pinnatipartite leaves with 5 to 11 linear to cylindrical lobes, and clusters of orange flowers often borne close to the ground.

== Description ==
Grevillea tenuiloba is a low, spreading shrub that typically grows to a height of 40–100 cm (16–39 in) and up to 3 m (9.8 ft) wide. Its leaves are pinnatipartite, 15–50 mm (0.59–1.97 in) long usually with 5 to 11 linear to more or less cylindrical lobes 2–25 mm (0.079–0.984 in) long, 0.6–1.3 mm (0.024–0.051 in) wide and sharply pointed. The leaf rachis is strongly turned down, and the edges of the leaves are rolled under, enclosing most of the lower surface. The flowers are pale to rich orange, often borne on or close to the ground, on one side of floral rachis 55–135 mm (2.2–5.3 in) long, the pistil 23–34 mm (0.91–1.34 in) long. Flowering occurs from August to October, and the fruit is a woolly-hairy follicle 11–14 mm (0.43–0.55 in) long.

== Taxonomy ==
Grevillea tenuiloba was first formally described in 1933 by Charles Gardner in the Journal of the Royal Society of Western Australia from specimens collected in 1932 near Dandaragan by William Blackall. The specific epithet (tenuiloba) is derived from the Latin word tenuis, meaning 'narrow', and the word lobus meaning 'lobe' in reference to the shape of the leaf lobes.

== Distribution and habitat ==
Amber grevillea grows in Melaleuca shrubland between Wongan Hills and Jibberding near Wubin in the Avon Wheatbelt bioregion of south-western Western Australia.

== Conservation status ==
Grevillea tenuiloba is listed as "Priority Three" by the Government of Western Australia Department of Biodiversity, Conservation and Attractions, meaning that it is poorly known and known from only a few locations but is not under imminent threat. It is also listed as Critically Endangered by the International Union for Conservation of Nature because of a predicted population decline of at least 80% over a period of the last 75 years due to the destruction of a majority of its habitat. The population is now predominantly restricted to roadside verges impacted by clearance and weed invasion.

== Use in horticulture ==
This grevillea can be grown from scarified seed or from firm cuttings of the current season's growth. It is best suited to a dry summer climate, unless grafted on to a hardy rootstock.

== See also ==
- List of Grevillea species
