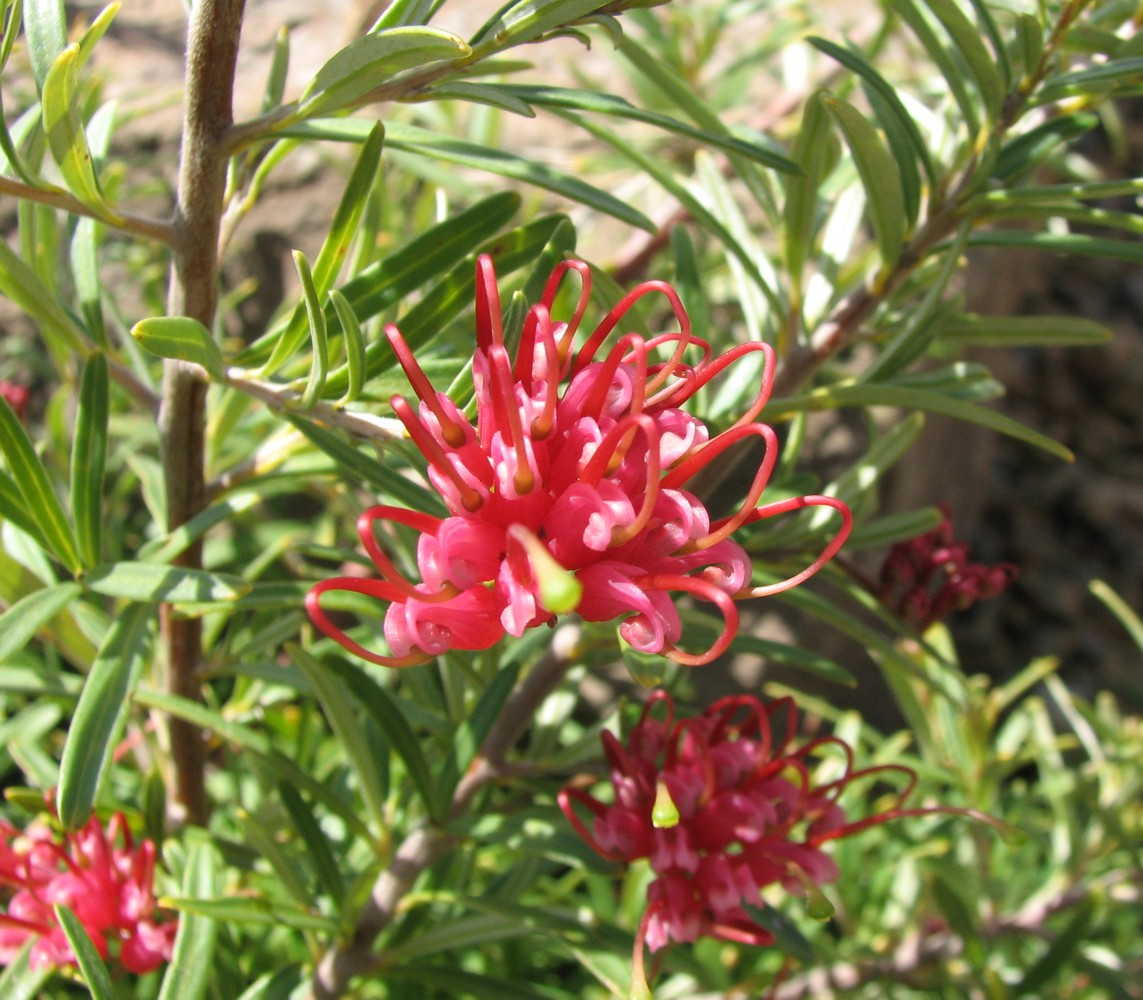
- 'Gingin Gem' in Royal Botanic Gardens, Cranbourne

Scientific classification
- Kingdom: Plantae
- Clade: Tracheophytes
- Clade: Angiosperms
- Clade: Eudicots
- Order: Proteales
- Family: Proteaceae
- Genus: Grevillea
- Species: G. obtusifolia

Binomial name
- Grevillea obtusifolia Meisn.

Synonyms
- Grevillea thelemanniana subsp. obtusifolia (Meisn.) Christenh. McGill.

= Grevillea obtusifolia =

Species of shrub endemic to Western Australia

Grevillea obtusifolia, commonly known as obtuse leaved grevillea, is a species of flowering plant in the family Proteaceae and is endemic to the south-west of Western Australia. It is a spreading to dense, prostrate shrub with oblong to narrowly elliptic leaves and clusters of eight to twelve, pink or red flowers.

== Description ==
Grevillea obtusifolia is a spreading or dense, low-lying or prostrate shrub that typically grows to 0.5–1.5 m (1 ft 8 in – 4 ft 11 in) and up to 5 m (16 ft) wide, its branchlets silky-hairy. The leaves are oblong to narrowly elliptic, 10–35 mm (0.39–1.38 in) long and mostly 2–4 mm (0.079–0.157 in) wide, the lower surface silky-hairy. The flowers are arranged in clusters of 8 to 12 on a rachis 8–15 mm (0.31–0.59 in) long, and are pale to bright pink or red, the pistil 20–24 mm (0.79–0.94 in) long. Flowering mostly occurs from April to November and the fruit is an oblong follicle 12–13 mm (0.47–0.51 in) long.

== Taxonomy ==
Grevillea obtusifolia was first formally described in 1856 by Carl Meissner in de Candolle's Prodromus Systematis Naturalis Regni Vegetabilis from specimens collected in the Swan River Colony by James Drummond. The specific epithet (obtusifolia) means "blunt-leaved".

== Distribution and habitat ==
Obtuse leaved grevillea grows in poorly-drained, winter-wet areas from Gingin to Muchea in the Jarrah Forest and Swan Coastal Plain bioregions of south-western Western Australia.
