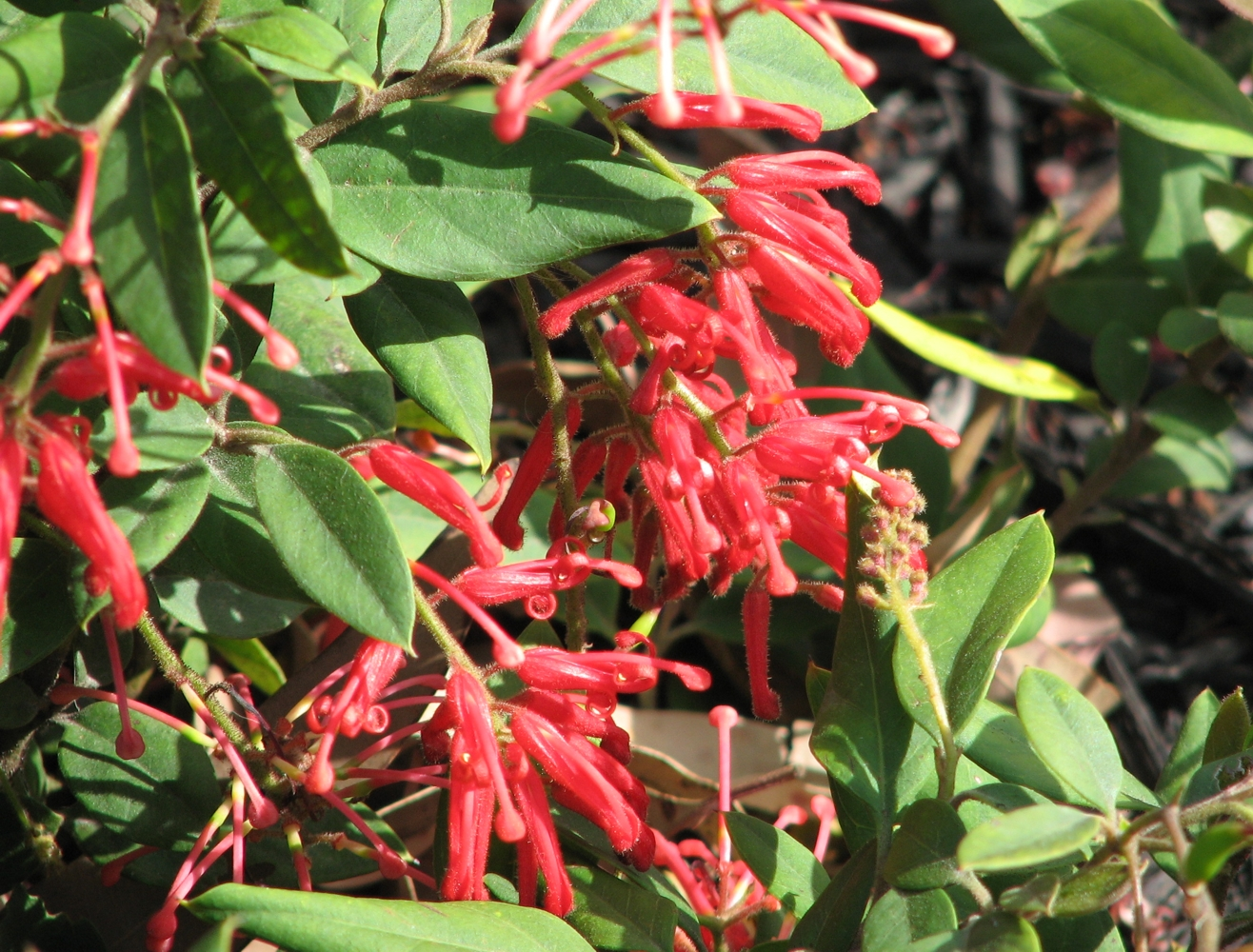
- Grevillea rhyolitica

Scientific classification
- Kingdom: Plantae
- Clade: Tracheophytes
- Clade: Angiosperms
- Clade: Eudicots
- Order: Proteales
- Family: Proteaceae
- Genus: Grevillea
- Species: G. rhyolitica

Binomial name
- Grevillea rhyolitica Makinson

Synonyms
- Grevillea sp. aff. victoriae 'B'

= Grevillea rhyolitica =

Deua grevillea

Species of shrub endemic to Australia

Grevillea rhyolitica, commonly known as Deua grevillea or Deua flame, is a species of flowering plant in the family Proteaceae and is endemic to south-eastern New South Wales. It is a more or less erect shrub with elliptic leaves and hairy red flowers.

== Description ==
Grevillea rhyolitica is usually a more or less erect shrub that typically grows to a height of 0.5–2 m (1 ft 8 in – 6 ft 7 in). Its leaves are elliptic, 40–110 mm (1.6–4.3 in) long and 10–25 mm (0.39–0.98 in) wide, the upper surface mostly glabrous and the lower surface sparsely hairy. The flowers are arranged on the ends of branches or in leaf axils near the ends of branches, in down-curved, oval to more or less spherical clusters of mostly 5 to 18 on a rachis 10–20 mm (0.39–0.79 in) long. The clusters are on a thin, wiry peduncle 15–20 mm (0.59–0.79 in) long, each flower on a pedicel 2–4 mm (0.079–0.157 in) long. The flowers are red and densely hairy except at the base, the pistil 16–20 mm (0.63–0.79 in) long. Flowering occurs from September to December, and the fruit is a glabrous follicle 18–22 mm (0.71–0.87 in) long with several longitudinal ridges.

== Taxonomy ==
Grevillea rhyolitica was first formally described in 1997 by Robert Owen Makinson in the journal Telopea from specimens collected in 1990 by David Albrecht. The specific epithet (rhyolitica) refers to the usual occurrence of this species on outcrops of rhyolite rock.

In 2000, Makinson described two subspecies of G. rhyolitica in the Flora of Australia, and the names are accepted by the Australian Plant Census:

- Grevillea rhyolitica Makinson subsp. rhyolitica has leaves with raised hairs on the lower surface.
- Grevillea rhyolitica subsp. semivestita Makinson has leaves with scattered hairs pressed against the lower surface.

== Distribution and habitat ==
Subspecies rhyolitica of Deua grevillea grows in moist gullies and in steep rocky ridges on rhyolite in montane areas west and south-west of Moruya and subspecies semivestita grows forest in broken escarpment country north-west of Moruya in south-eastern New South Wales.
