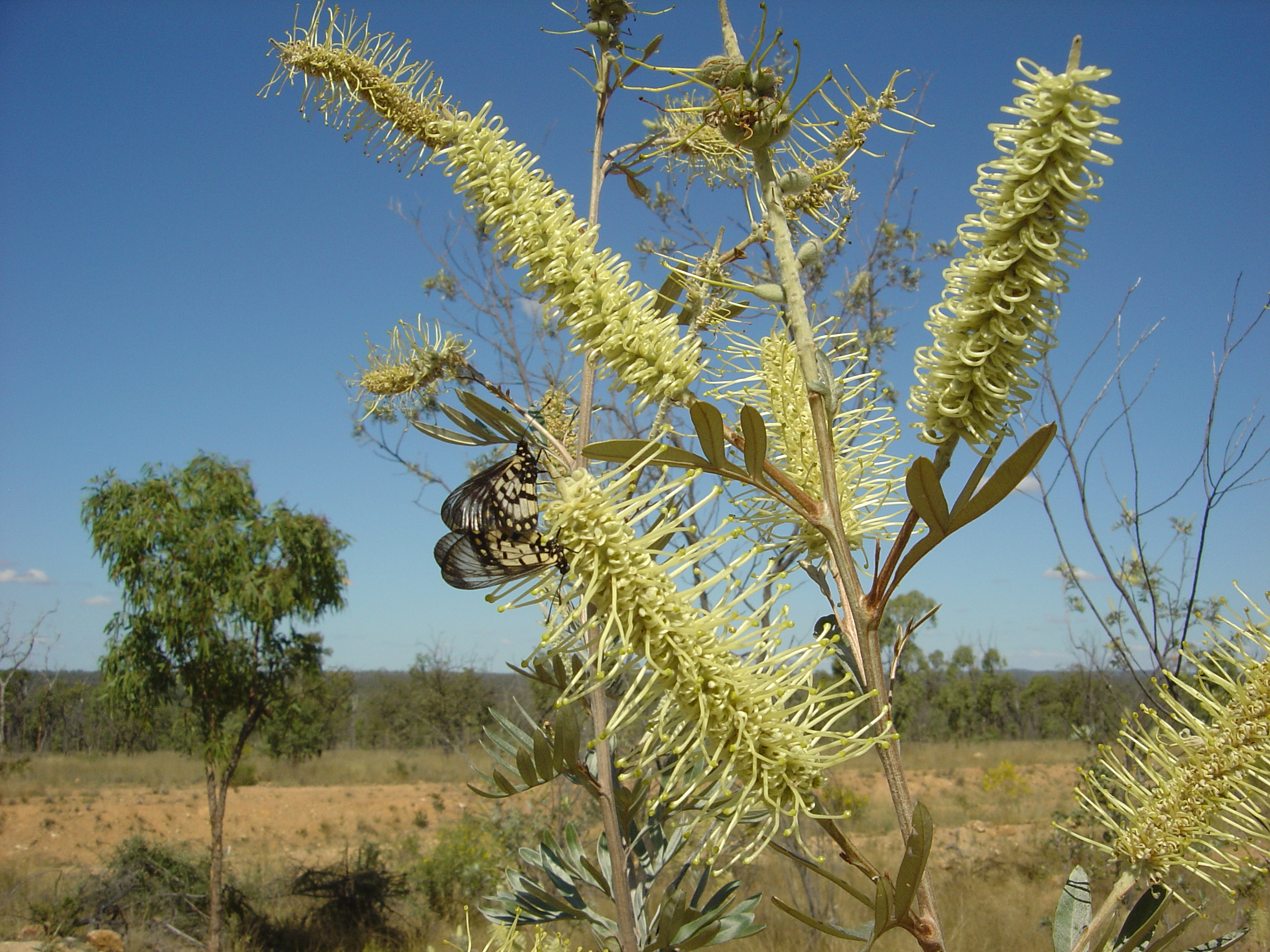

Scientific classification
- Kingdom: Plantae
- Clade: Embryophytes
- Clade: Tracheophytes
- Clade: Spermatophytes
- Clade: Angiosperms
- Clade: Eudicots
- Order: Proteales
- Family: Proteaceae
- Genus: Grevillea
- Species: G. sessilis

Binomial name
- Grevillea sessilis C.T.White & W.D.Francis

= Grevillea sessilis =

Species of shrub endemic to Queensland, Australia

Grevillea sessilis is a species of flowering plant in the family Proteaceae and is endemic to north-eastern Queensland. It is a shrub or small tree with divided leaves and cylindrical clusters of white flowers with a creamy-white or greenish yellow style.

== Description ==
Grevillea sessilis is a shrub or small tree that typically grows to a height of 2–6 m (6 ft 7 in – 19 ft 8 in). Its leaves are 50–160 mm (2.0–6.3 in) long and pinnatipartite with 5 to 18 narrowly egg-shaped or oblong lobes 25–80 mm (0.98–3.15 in) long and 4–12 mm (0.16–0.47 in) wide. The flowers are arranged in cylindrical clusters along a rachis 50–180 mm (2.0–7.1 in) long, the pistil 17.5–31 mm (0.69–1.22 in) long. The flowers are white with a creamy-white or yellowish green style with a green tip. Flowering occurs from April to December and the fruit is a hairy follicle 12.5–15 mm (0.49–0.59 in) long.

== Taxonomy ==
Grevillea sessilis was first formally described in 1926 by Cyril Tenison White and William Douglas Francis from specimens collected by Queensland naturalist J. Edgar Young (1871 - 1956) near Torrens Creek.

== Distribution and habitat ==
This grevillea grows in open woodland or shrubland in shallow soil over sandstone on low mountain ranges between Cairns, Springsure and Theodore in eastern Queensland.

== Conservation status ==
Grevillea sessilis is listed as "not threatened" under the Queensland Government Nature Conservation Act 1992.
