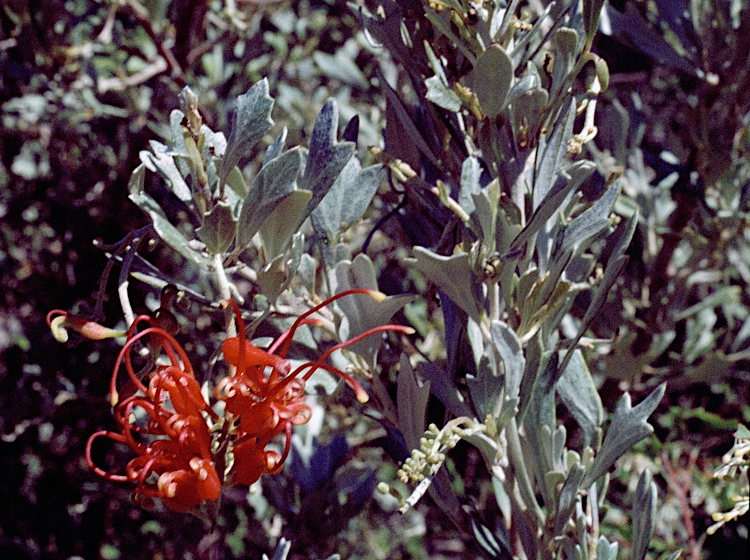
- In Kings Park Botanic Gardens

Scientific classification
- Kingdom: Plantae
- Clade: Tracheophytes
- Clade: Angiosperms
- Clade: Eudicots
- Order: Proteales
- Family: Proteaceae
- Genus: Grevillea
- Species: G. variifolia

Binomial name
- Grevillea variifolia C.A.Gardner & A.S.George

= Grevillea variifolia =

Cape Range grevillea

Species of shrub endemic to Western Australia

Grevillea variifolia, commonly known as the Cape Range grevillea, is species of flowering plant in the family Proteaceae and is endemic to the far west of Western Australia. It is a spreading to sprawling, irregularly-branched shrub, with broadly egg-shaped to trowel-shaped leaves usually with 3 to 7 teeth or lobes, and down-turned clusters of red flowers with a yellow-tipped style.

== Description ==
Grevillea variifolia is a spreading to sprawling, irregularly-branched shrub that typically grows to a height of 0.3–1.5 m (1 ft 0 in – 4 ft 11 in) and has somewhat silky-hairy branchlets. Its leaves are egg-shaped to trowel-shaped with the narrower end towards the base, 10–55 mm (0.39–2.17 in) long and 3–25 mm (0.12–0.98 in) wide on a short petiole, with 3 to 7 sharply-pointed lobes. The flowers are arranged in down-turned clusters, more or less on one side of a rachis 15–50 mm (0.59–1.97 in) long, the flowers nearer the base of the rachis flowering first, each flower on a pedicel 2.5–3.5 mm (0.098–0.138 in) long. The flowers are red with a yellow-tipped style, the pistil 25–28 mm (0.98–1.10 in) long. Flowering mainly occurs from June to October, and the fruit is a glabrous, ridged, oval follicle 12–16 mm (0.47–0.63 in) long.

== Taxonomy ==
Grevillea variifolia was first formally described in 1963 by Charles Austin Gardner and Alex George in the Journal of the Royal Society of Western Australia from specimens collected by George in the Cape Range in 1961. The specific epithet (variifolia) means "varying-leaved".

In 1998, Greg Keighery described two subspecies of G. variifolia in the journal Nuytsia, and the names are accepted by the Australian Plant Census:

- Grevillea variifolia subsp. bundera Keighery has mature leaves with a petiole about 2 mm (0.079 in) long, the leaves usually triangular 11–15 mm (0.43–0.59 in) long and up to 5 mm (0.20 in) wide with up to 5 sharply-pointed lobes.
- Grevillea variifolia C.A.Gardner & A.S.George subsp. varifolia has mature leaves with a petiole 3–6 mm (0.12–0.24 in) long, the leaves usually lance-shaped to wedge-shaped, 17–43 mm (0.67–1.69 in) long and 15–22 mm (0.59–0.87 in) wide with up to 3 to 7 lobes that are rarely sharply pointed.

== Distribution and habitat ==
Cape Range grevillea grows in open shrubland, subsp. bundera between Cape Cuvier and the Rough Range (inland from Ningaloo), and subsp. variifolia in the northern part of North West Cape.

== Conservation status ==
Grevillea variifolia is listed as "not threatened" by the Government of Western Australia Department of Biodiversity, Conservation and Attractions.

== See also ==
- List of Grevillea species
