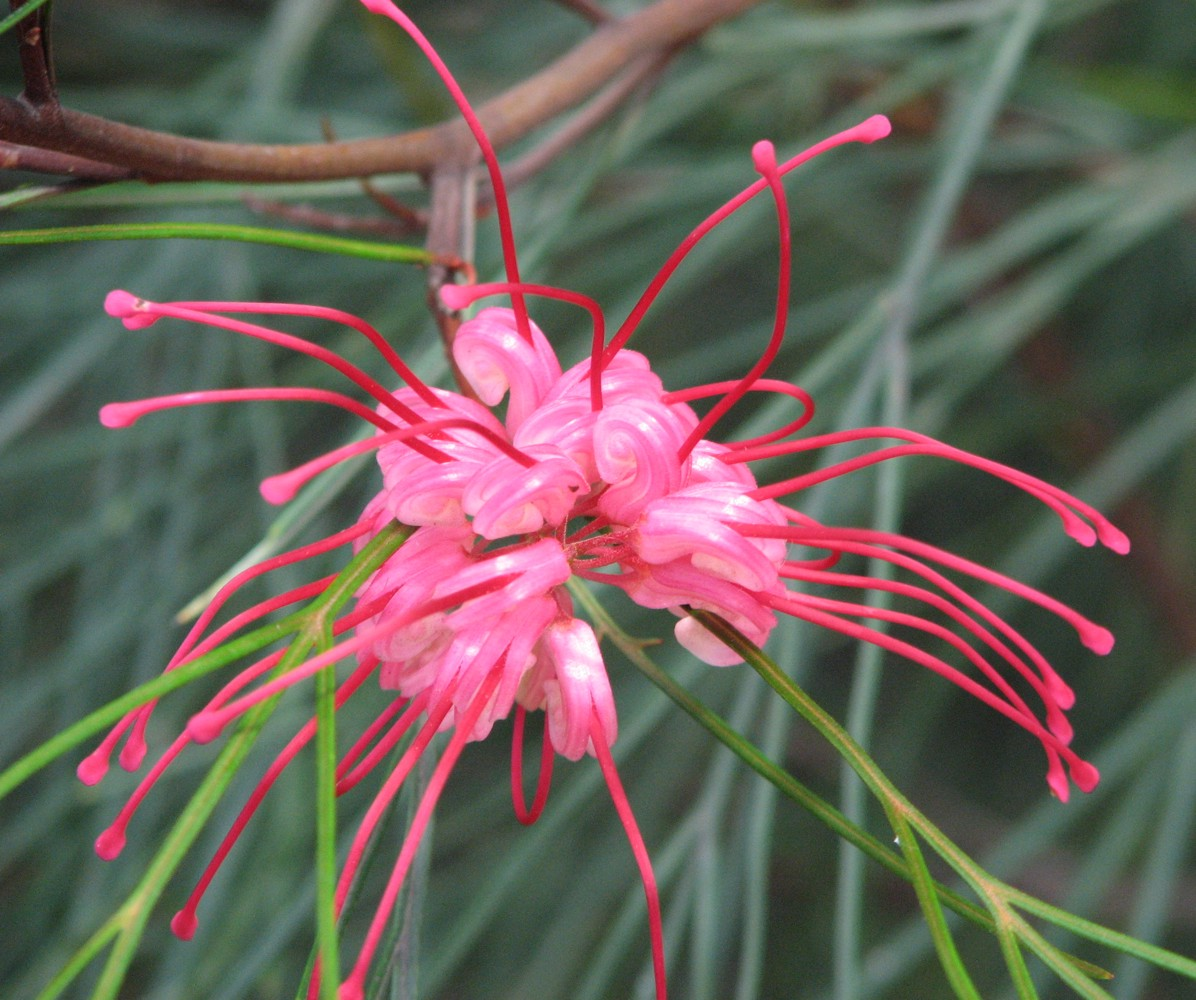
- In Maranoa Gardens

Conservation status
- Least Concern (IUCN 3.1)

Scientific classification
- Kingdom: Plantae
- Clade: Tracheophytes
- Clade: Angiosperms
- Clade: Eudicots
- Order: Proteales
- Family: Proteaceae
- Genus: Grevillea
- Species: G. longistyla

Binomial name
- Grevillea longistyla Hook.

Synonyms
- Grevillea neglecta R.Br.

= Grevillea longistyla =

Species of shrub endemic to Queensland, Australia

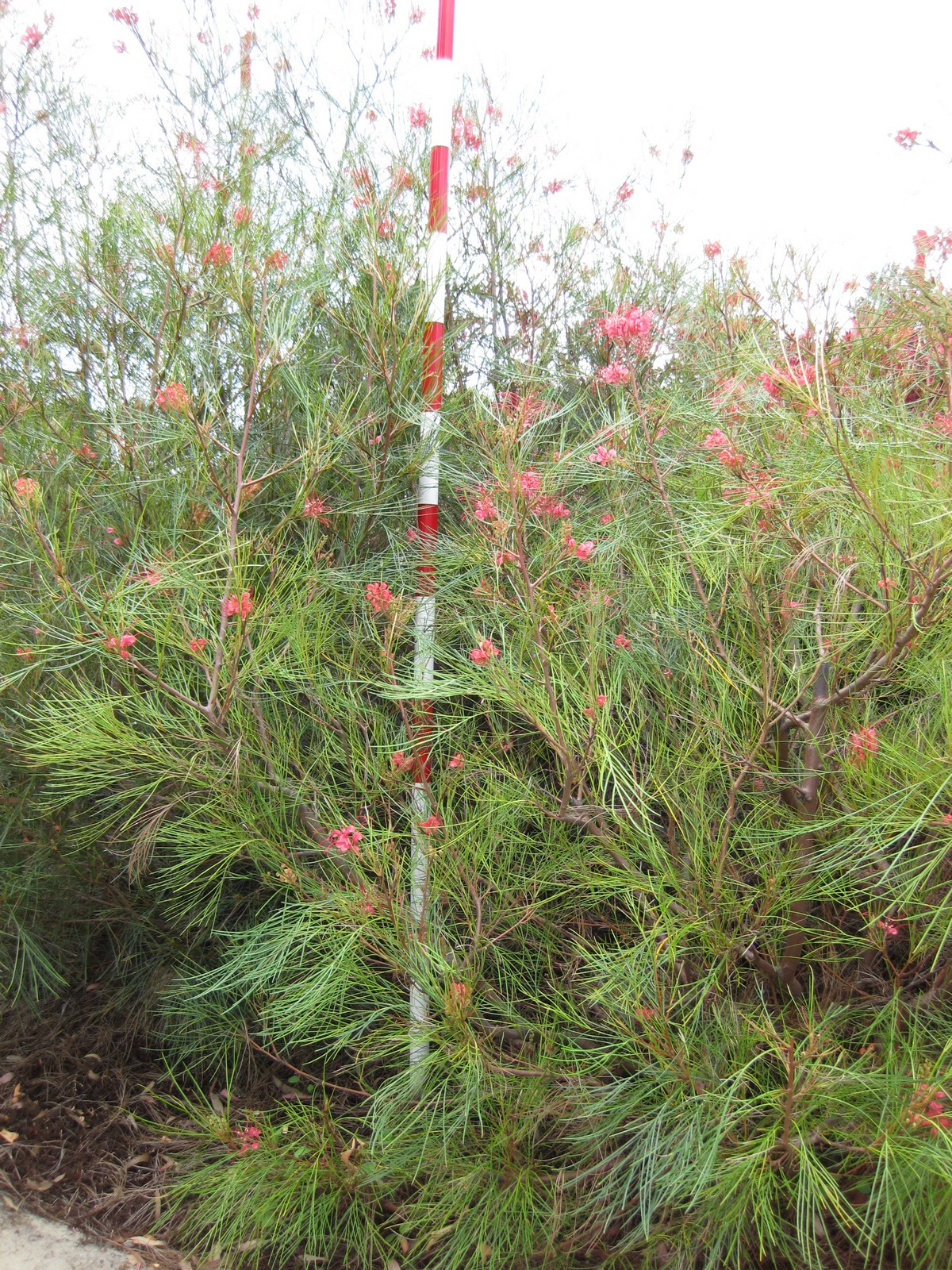
Habit in the Royal Botanic Gardens, Cranbourne

Grevillea longistyla is a species of flowering plant in the family Proteaceae and is endemic to Queensland in Australia. It is a shrub with divided leaves with linear lobes or simple, linear leaves, and groups of red to orange-red or bright pink flowers.

== Description ==
Grevillea longistyla is a shrub that typically grows to a height of 1.5–5 m (4 ft 11 in – 16 ft 5 in) and forms a lignotuber. Its leaves are 120–300 mm (4.7–11.8 in) long and either simple, or divided with two to six lobes, the leaves or lobes 1.5–4 mm (0.059–0.157 in) wide but not sharply-pointed. The edges of the leaves are turned down or rolled under. The flowers are arranged in sometimes branched groups on a rachis usually 25–85 mm (0.98–3.35 in) long and are red to orange-red or bright pink, the pistil usually 40–52 mm (1.6–2.0 in) long. Flowering occurs in most months, peaking from August to November, and the fruit is an oblong follicle 10–14 mm (0.39–0.55 in) long with a rough surface.

== Taxonomy ==
Grevillea longistyla was first formally described in 1848 by William Jackson Hooker in Thomas Mitchell's Journal of an Expedition into the Interior of Tropical Australia. The specific epithet (longistyla) means "having a long style".

== Distribution and habitat ==
This grevillea usually grows in woodland or forest and is found between Chinchilla, Gurulmundi and the Blackdown Tableland National Park in central and south-eastern Queensland.

== Conservation status ==
Grevillea longistyla is listed as 'Least Concern' in the IUCN Red List and under the Queensland Government Nature Conservation Act 1992.
