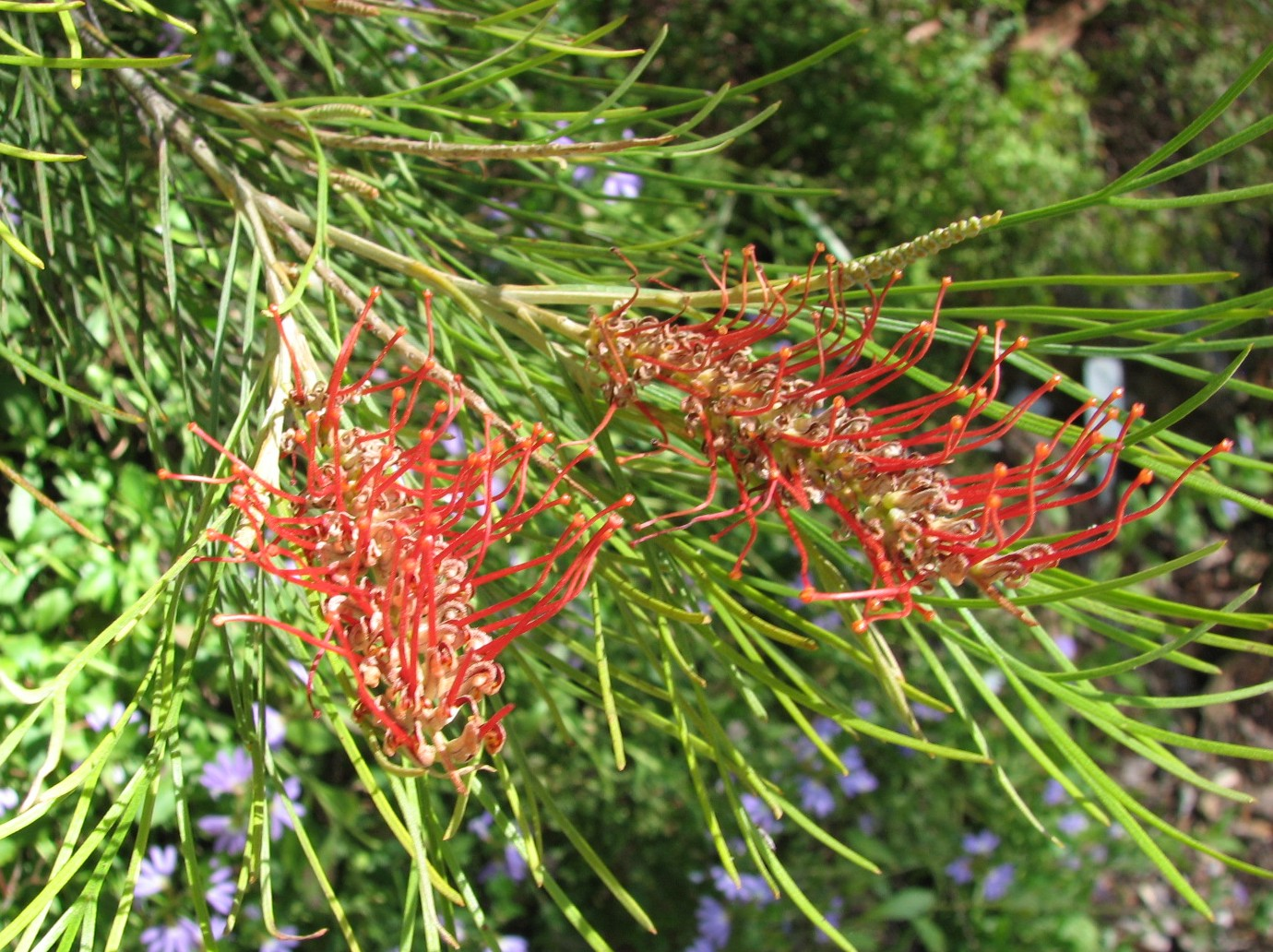

Conservation status
- Endangered (IUCN 3.1)

Scientific classification
- Kingdom: Plantae
- Clade: Tracheophytes
- Clade: Angiosperms
- Clade: Eudicots
- Order: Proteales
- Family: Proteaceae
- Genus: Grevillea
- Species: G. tetragonoloba

Binomial name
- Grevillea tetragonoloba Meisn.

= Grevillea tetragonoloba =

Species of shrub endemic to Western Australia

Grevillea tetragonoloba is species of flowering plant in the family Proteaceae and is endemic to the southwest of Western Australia. It is a dense, erect to spreading shrub, usually with pinnatipartite to almost pinnatisect leaves, the end lobes linear, and clusters of yellowish-brown to fawn flowers with a scarlet to orange-red style.

== Description ==
Grevillea tetragonoloba is dense, erect to spreading shrub that typically grows to a height of 2.0–2.5 m (6 ft 7 in – 8 ft 2 in). Its leaves are 60–130 mm (2.4–5.1 in) long and mostly pinnatipartite to almost pinnatisect with 3 to 13 lobes, the end lobes linear, 30–130 mm (1.2–5.1 in) long, 0.8–1.5 mm (0.031–0.059 in) wide, sharply pointed and rectangular in cross-section. The flowers are arranged on one side of a rachis 45–115 mm (1.8–4.5 in) long, the flowers yellowish-brown to fawn with a scarlet to orange-red style, the pistil 22–25 mm (0.87–0.98 in) long. Flowering occurs throughout the year with a peak between October and March, and the fruit a follicle 10–15 mm (0.39–0.59 in) long.

== Taxonomy ==
Grevillea tetragonoloba was first formally described in 1856 by Carl Meissner in de Candolle's Prodromus Systematis Naturalis Regni Vegetabilis from specimens collected by James Drummond in the Swan River Colony. The specific epithet (tetragonoloba) means "four-angled lobe", referring to the cross-sectional shape of the leaf lobes.

== Distribution and habitat ==
This grevillea grows in mallee heath, woodland and shrubland between Cape Riche and Needilup and near Bremer Bay in the Esperance Plains, Jarrah Forest and Mallee bioregions of south-western Western Australia.

== Conservation status ==
Grevillea tetragonoloba is listed as "not threatened" by the Western Australian Government Department of Biodiversity, Conservation and Attractions. Grevillea tetragonoloba is listed as Endangered by the IUCN Red List and its main threats include road and agriculture construction and weed invasion.
