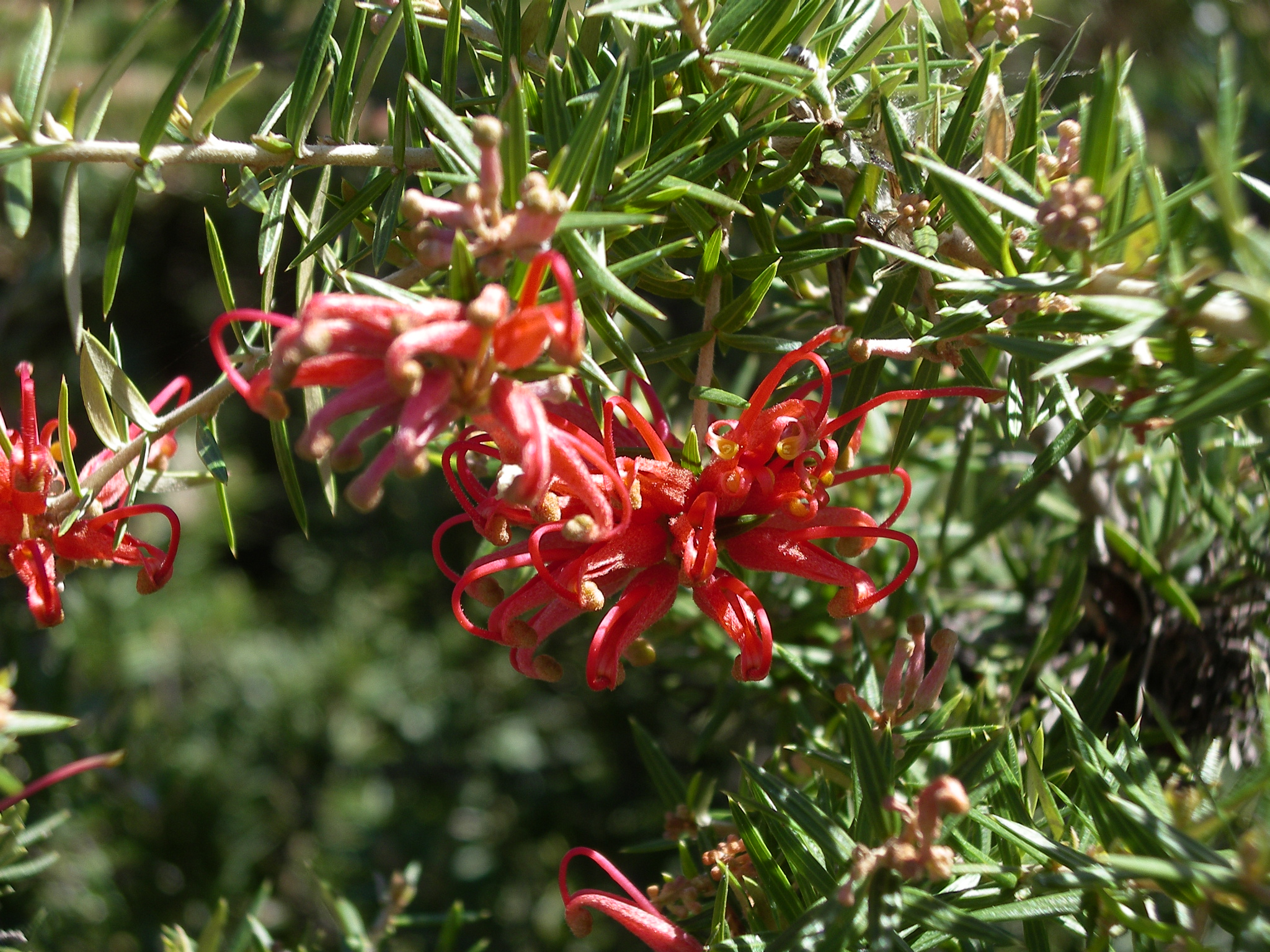

Conservation status
- Least Concern (IUCN 3.1)

Scientific classification
- Kingdom: Plantae
- Clade: Embryophytes
- Clade: Tracheophytes
- Clade: Angiosperms
- Clade: Eudicots
- Order: Proteales
- Family: Proteaceae
- Genus: Grevillea
- Species: G. juniperina

Binomial name
- Grevillea juniperina R.Br.

= Grevillea juniperina =

Species of plant native to Australia

Grevillea juniperina, commonly known as juniper- or juniper-leaf grevillea or prickly spider-flower, is a plant of the family Proteaceae native to eastern New South Wales and southeastern Queensland in Australia. Scottish botanist Robert Brown described the species in 1810, and seven subspecies are recognised. One subspecies, G. j. juniperina, is restricted to Western Sydney and environs and is threatened by loss of habitat and housing development.

A small, prickly-leaved shrub between 0.2–3 m (0.66–9.84 ft) high, G. juniperina generally grows on clay-based or alluvial soils in eucalypt woodland. The flower heads, known as inflorescences, appear from winter to early summer and are red, orange or yellow. Birds visit and pollinate the flowers. Grevillea juniperina plants are killed by bushfire, regenerating afterwards from seed. Grevillea juniperina adapts readily to cultivation and has been important in horticulture as it is the parent of many popular garden hybrids.

== Description ==
Grevillea juniperina has a spreading or erect habit (growth form) and it grows to between 0.2–3 m (0.66–9.84 ft) in height. The branchlets are thick and sturdy. The prickly leaves are generally stiff and are 0.5–3.5 cm (1/4–1 3/8 in) long and 0.5–6 mm (1/32–1/4 in) wide. They are crowded along the stems. Flowering occurs throughout the year, peaking between midwinter and early summer, though it varies between the different subspecies. Subspecies allojohnsonii flowers from September to February, subspecies trinervis flowers from August to December, and subspecies juniperina, amphitricha, sulphurea, villosa and fortis flower in August and September. The spider-flower arrangement of the inflorescence has several individual flowers emerging from a central rounded flower head—reminiscent of the legs of a spider. The flowers are red, pink, orange, yellow or greenish, and are mostly terminal—arising on the ends of stems—though they occasionally arise from axillary buds. They are 2.5–3.5 cm (1–1 3/8 in) long. The perianth is finely furred on the outside, while the pistil is smooth; it is 1.5–2.7 cm (5/8–1 1/8 in) long. Flowering is followed by the development of seed pods, each capsule is 10–18 mm (3/8–3/4 in) long, and releases one or two seeds when ripe. The narrow oval seed is 7.5–12 mm (1/4–1/2 in) and 2.2–3.3 mm (1/16–1/8 in) wide, with a swelling at the apex and a short wing. Both surfaces are covered with tiny hairs.

Similar species include the Wingello grevillea (Grevillea molyneuxii), which can be distinguished by its prominent midvein on the leaf undersurface, and the red spider-flower (G. speciosa), which has wider leaves with lateral veins and longer pistil.

== Taxonomy ==
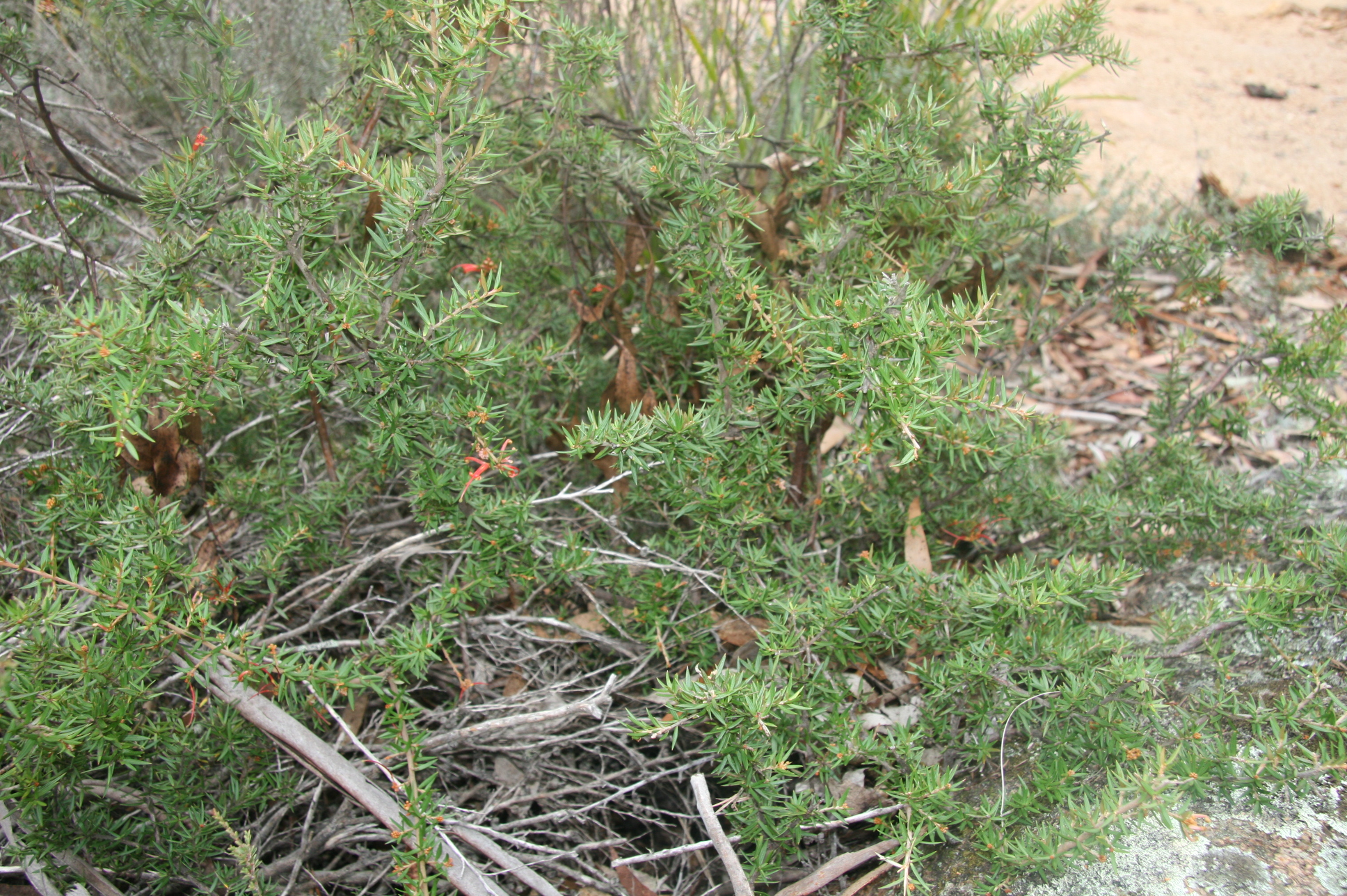
Low spreading habit of a form growing in Kanangra-Boyd National Park

The type specimen for this species was collected from the Port Jackson area (Sydney district) and was described by botanist Robert Brown in 1810, who gave it the specific epithet juniperina that alludes to its juniper-like foliage. Likewise, it is commonly known as juniper- or juniper-leaf grevillea, as well as prickly spider-flower. The lectotype was selected by Don MacGillivray in 1993 from a collection by George Caley in 1803 11 km (6.8 mi) northwest of Prospect in what is now Sydney's outer western suburbs. Brown placed it in the series Lissostylis in his 1810 work Prodromus Florae Novae Hollandiae et Insulae Van Diemen.

English botanist and explorer Allan Cunningham collected what he called Grevillea sulphurea in 1822 near Coxs River in the Bathurst area, where it grew alongside G. rosmarinifolia and G. arenaria subspecies canescens. This was later synonymised with G. juniperina, before being recognised as a distinct subspecies.

George Bentham placed G. juniperina in Section Lissostylis in his 1870 Flora Australiensis. This section has become the Linearifolia group of 45 species of shrub in southeastern Australia. Within this group, G. juniperina is classified in the Speciosa subgroup, five species of bird-pollinated grevilleas found in eastern Australia. The others are G. molyneuxii, G. dimorpha, G. oleoides and G. speciosa.

In 2000, Robert Owen Makinson described seven subspecies of G. juniperina in the Flora of Australia, and the names are accepted by the Australian Plant Census:

- G. juniperina subsp. allojohnsonii Makinson is a prostrate shrub to 30 cm (12 in) high with red flowers;
- G. juniperina subsp. amphitricha Makinson is a prostrate or spreading shrub with yellow or orange flowers that grows to 0.2–1.2 m (5/8–3 7/8 ft) tall and 3 m (9.8 ft) wide;
- G. juniperina subsp. fortis Makinson is a vigorous red-flowered shrub growing to 1–3 m (3.3–9.8 ft) tall;
- G. juniperina R.Br. subsp. juniperina is a spreading shrub that is 0.5–1.5 m (1.6–4.9 ft) high;
- G. juniperina subsp. sulphurea (A.Cunn.) Makinson is a shrub up to 2 m (6.6 ft) high;
- G. juniperina subsp. trinervis (R.Br.) Makinson (formerly Grevillea trinervis) is a prickly shrub with a spreading or prostrate habit ranging from 0.5–1.2 m (1 ft 8 in – 3 ft 11 in), or rarely 2 m (6 ft 7 in) and has yellow, orange or red flowers;
- G. juniperina subsp. villosa Makinson is an upright red- or yellow-flowered shrub up to 2 m (6.6 ft) high.

Subspecies sulphurea hybridises with G. juniperina subsp. trinervis in the southern and western Blue Mountains.

== Distribution and habitat ==
- Subspecies allojohnsonii is found on the Northern Tablelands and North West Slopes in northern New South Wales, from Walcha north to Tenterfield and Stanhope and Girraween National Park in southern Queensland.
- Subspecies amphitricha grows in woodland and grassland on slopes and ridges between Braidwood and Nerriga in the Shoalhaven River catchment on the Southern Tablelands.
- Subspecies fortis grows in forest, woodland and shrubland and is found on rocky hills and slopes near watercourses, specifically along Ginninderra Creek, the lower reaches of the Molonglo and Cotter Rivers, and the Murrumbidgee River from Pine Island downstream to where it is joined by the Molonglo River—mostly within the Australian Capital Territory.
- Subspecies juniperina grows in forest or woodland and is found in Cumberland Plain and Castlereagh Woodland communities on clay-loam soils, growing alongside such species as forest redgum (Eucalyptus tereticornis), mugga ironbark (E. sideroxylon), thin-leaved stringybark (E. eugenioides), broad-leaved red ironbark (E. fibrosa), grey box (E. moluccana), white feather honeymyrtle (Melaleuca decora), boxthorn (Bursaria spinosa), sickle wattle (Acacia falcata) and Dillwynia tenuifolia. The annual rainfall in regions where G. juniperina grows is 600 to 800 mm (24 to 31 in).
- Subspecies sulphurea grows on alluvial soils, often with Leptospermum species, along riverbanks and is found in the catchments of the Coxs, Kowmung, Wollondilly and Shoalhaven Rivers in the Central and Southern Tablelands, from Tallong to Berrima, as well as Lidsdale to Jenolan State Forest in the southwestern Blue Mountains.
- Subspecies trinervis is found in the western Blue Mountains where it grows on alluvial soil with poor drainage in woodland or along riverbanks in association with snow gum (Eucalyptus pauciflora), mountain gum (E. dalrympleana), Dillwynia retorta and river lomatia (Lomatia myricoides).
- Subspecies villosa is found along watercourses in eucalypt forest east and northeast of Braidwood, as well as near Currockbilly in southeastern New South Wales.

== Ecology ==
Killed by bushfire, Grevillea juniperina regenerates afterwards by seeds that germinate after lying dormant in the soil, stimulated by exposure to heat and smoke. Plants over 1 m (3.3 ft) high produce more seed. Intervals of 10 to 15 years between fires are thought to be most beneficial for the species' survival, as this allows seed numbers to build up in the soil over time. Grevillea juniperina can also colonise disturbed areas, though overgrowth of Bursaria spinosa can negatively impact its spread.

Grevillea juniperina is pollinated by birds, with bees also recorded visiting flowers. The leaves are food for caterpillars of the cyprotus blue butterfly (Candalides cyprotus). A springtail species of Australian origin—Calvatomina superba—was found on Grevillea juniperina cultivated at the Lost Gardens of Heligan in Cornwall.

== Conservation status ==
Subspecies juniperina is listed vulnerable on Schedule 2 of the Threatened Species Conservation Act 1995 in New South Wales. Its habitat is threatened by housing development, road upgrading, inappropriate fire regimes, weed invasion, rubbish dumping and trampling either by people or cars.

== Use in horticulture ==
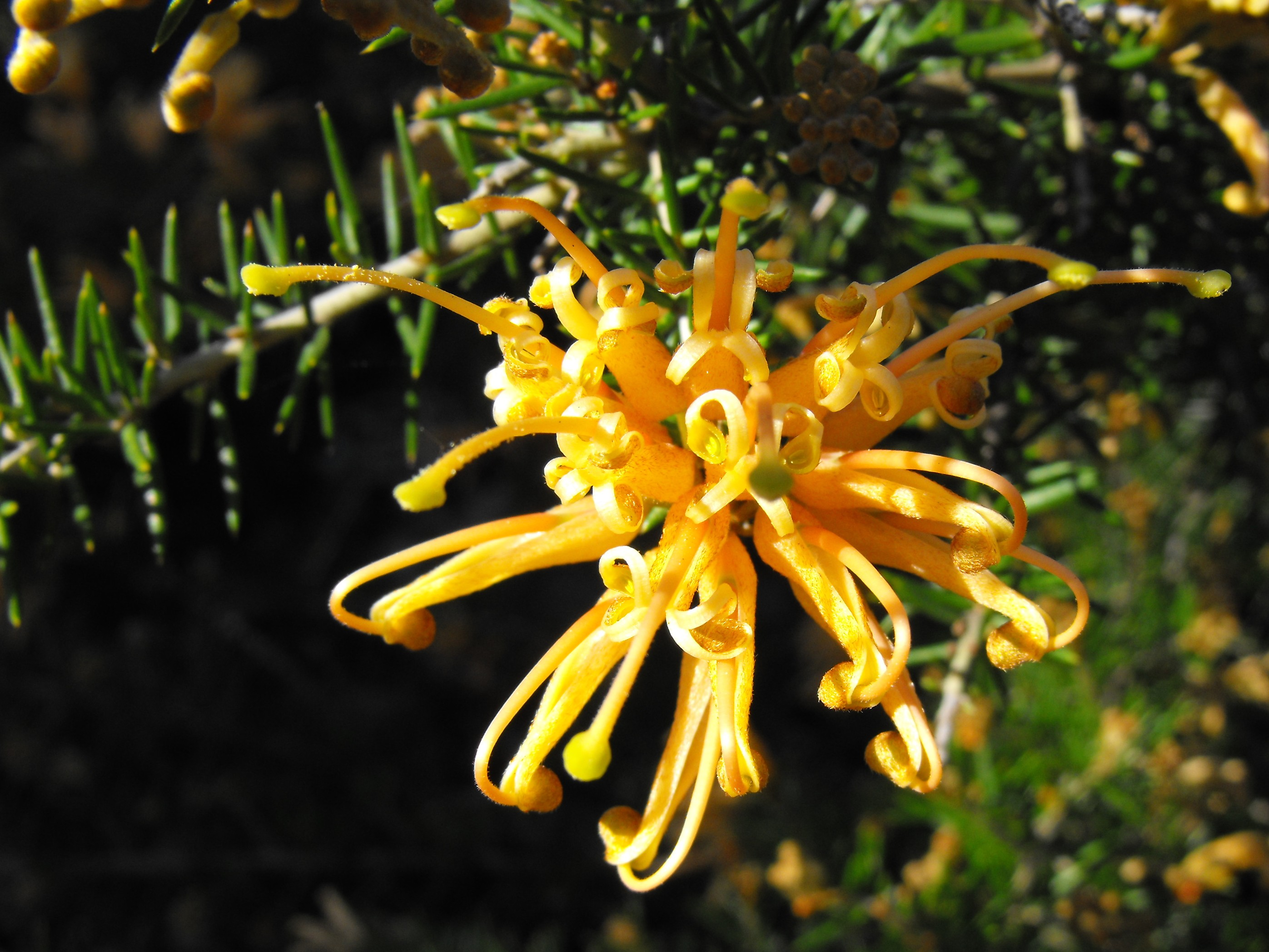
'Molonglo'

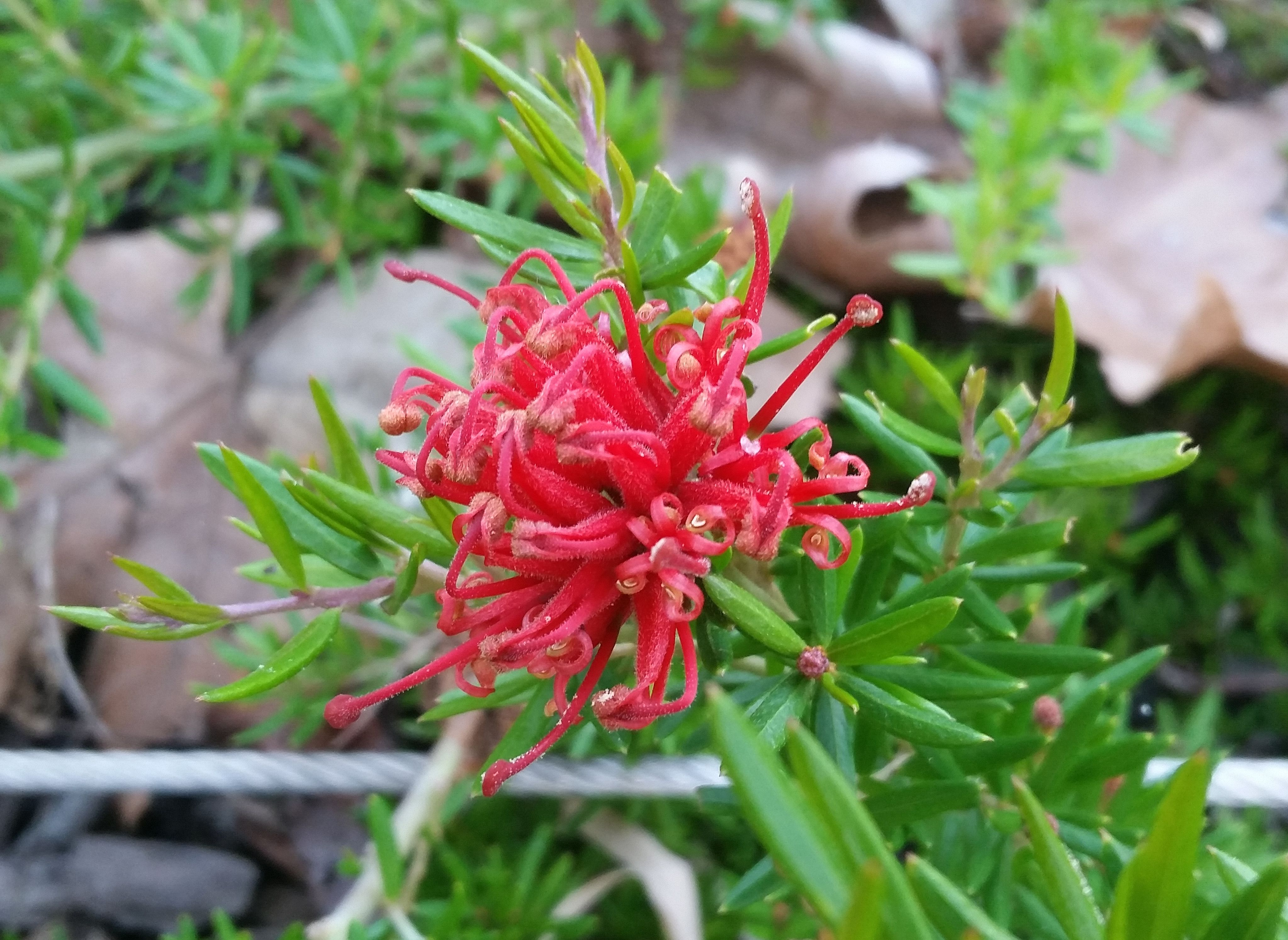
'New Blood'

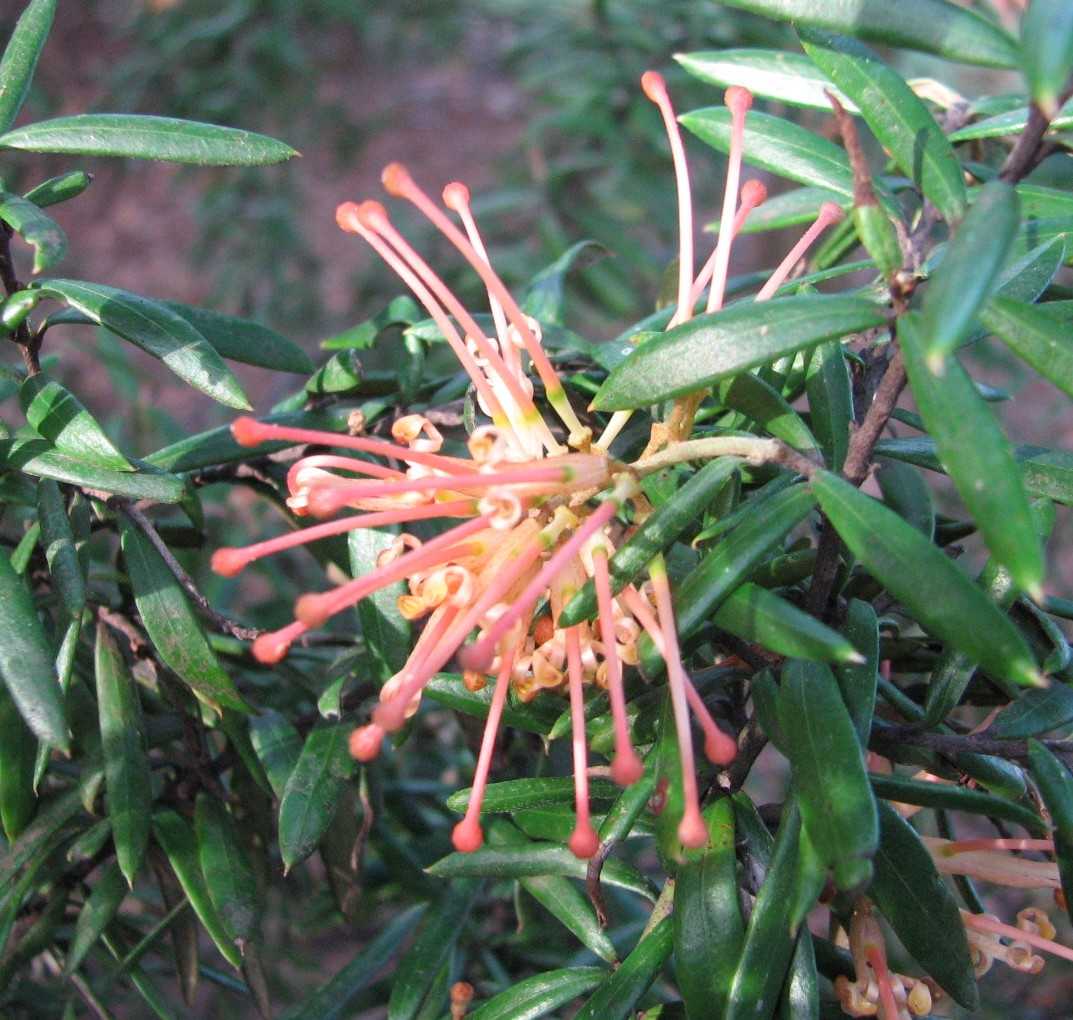
'Poorinda Queen'

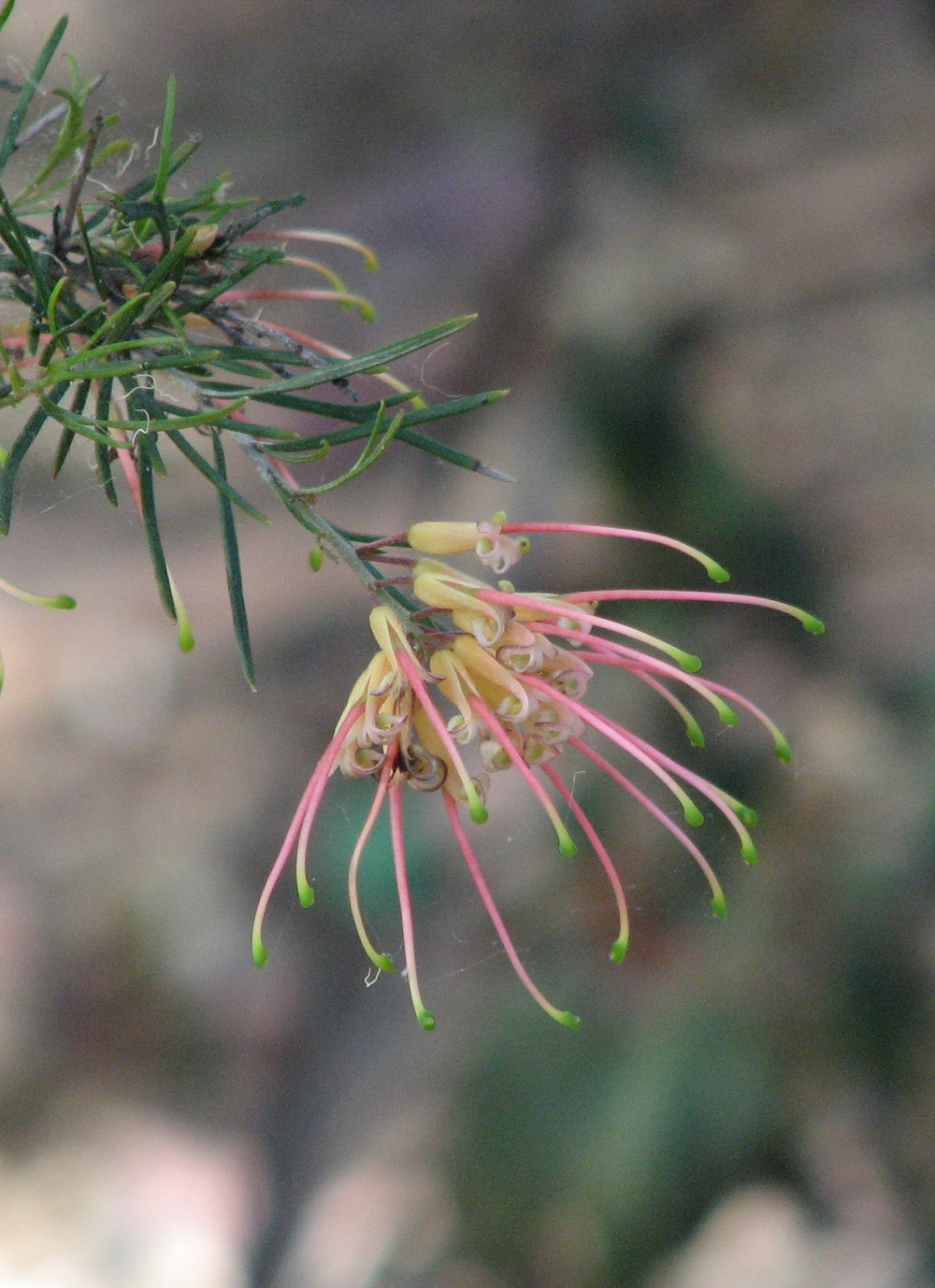
Grevillea × semperflorens

Allan Cunningham sent seed of G. juniperina to England in 1820; it was grown there the following year. Baron Charles von Hügel grew the species in Vienna in 1831. It has been grown outdoors in southern England, particularly G. juniperina subspecies sulphurea. Grevillea juniperina adapts easily to cultivation and grows in a wide range of soils and aspects in locations with good drainage. Long-flowering, it attracts birds such as honeyeaters with its nectar. The prickly dense foliage is also a good nesting site and shelter, particularly for smaller birds, such as finches. Many forms and hybrids have been commercially propagated and sold, some having more horticultural appeal than others. Low winter temperatures promote more prolific flowering and pruning promotes dense foliage. Plants are readily propagated by cuttings or seed, although propagation by cuttings is required to ensure the new plants have the same characteristics of the parent. Direct contact with the plant may cause a skin rash.

Many cultivars have been selected for horticultural use, either selected forms or hybrids with other Grevillea species. One prominent early breeder was Leo Hodge of W Tree, Victoria. Hodge became interested in breeding grevilleas after finding seedlings in his garden. His first trials involved crossing G. juniperina with G. victoriae, producing G. 'Poorinda Queen', which was the first to flower, followed by G. 'Poorinda Constance', G. 'Poorinda Leane' and G. 'Poorinda Pink Coral' respectively, all in 1952.

Cultivars include:

- 'Allyn Radiance' – derived from a prostrate orange and prostrate red forms of G. juniperina.
- 'Audrey' – G. juniperina crossed with G. victoriae. Bred in 1957 by George Althofer, who named it after his wife. It grows to 2 m (6.6 ft) high and wide and produces orange-red flowers over many months. It is popular in South Africa and the US.
- 'Canberra Gem' – G. juniperina crossed with G. rosmarinifolia. Registered with the Australian Cultivar Registration Authority in 1976.
- 'Canterbury Gold' – prostrate yellow form of G. juniperina crossed with Grevillea parvula.
- 'Goldfever' – G. juniperina crossed with Grevillea rhyolitica.
- 'H22' (Gold Cluster) – a dense growing prostrate selection with yellow flowers.
- 'Lunar Light' – a low-growing form with variegated leaves and orange-pink flowers. It is suitable for rockeries.
- 'Molonglo' – a form with a low–spreading habit and larger orange flowers with red styles. It was bred by Rudolph Willing of Australian National University in 1964, from two disparate forms of juniperina, an erect red-flowered form from around Canberra and a yellow-flowered spreading prostrate form from the western slopes of the Budawang Range in 1964. It is named after the Molonglo River.
- 'New Blood' – a compact red-flowered shrub resulting from a cross of 'Molonglo' cultivar with G. rhyolitica.
- 'Old Gold' – a low spreading shrub with yellow new growth, lobed leaves and greyish-yellow flowers with pink styles. It is derived from G. juniperina crossed with Grevillea ilicifolia.
- 'Orange Box' – G. juniperina crossed with G. victoriae.
- 'Pink Lady' – G. juniperina crossed with G. rosmarinifolia. Bred by Stan Kirby of Queanbeyan, it was grown widely in the early 1970s. A shrub to 60 cm (2.0 ft) high and 3 m (9.8 ft) wide with pale pink flowers.
- 'Poorinda Adorning' – a seedling that grew in Hodge's garden, registered in 1978. The original plant grew in 1965.
- 'Poorinda Annette' – a cross with the small-flowered form of Grevillea alpina.
- 'Poorinda Beauty' – a cross with Grevillea alpina.
- 'Poorinda Belinda' – a cross with a hybrid of the yellow flower form of Grevillea obtusiflora and Grevillea alpina.
- 'Poorinda Constance' – a cross with Grevillea victoriae.
- 'Poorinda Jeanie' – a red-flowering shrub that grows up to 2 m (6.6 ft) high. It is derived from a cross with Grevillea alpina.
- 'Poorinda Leane' – a cross with G. victoriae. It is a spreading shrub to 4 m (13 ft) high with buff or apricot flowers.
- 'Poorinda Pink Coral' – a cross with G. victoriae, named for the colour of its flowers.
- 'Poorinda Queen' – derived from a cross with a yellow-flowered form of Grevillea victoriae. It has apricot-pink flowers.
- 'Poorinda Refrain' – a cross with Grevillea floribunda.
- 'Poorinda Rachel' – a 1 m (3.3 ft) high hybrid cross with Grevillea alpina, which has buff-cerise flowers, and was developed in 1965–66.
- 'Poorinda Rosalie' – a taller rose-red flowered hybrid with G. victoriae, developed in 1967–68.
- 'Poorinda Signet' – a cross with Grevillea lanigera.
- × semperflorens – a hybrid of English origin derived from a cross of Grevillea juniperina var. sulphurea with Grevillea thelemanniana.
