= Flame grevillea =

Flame grevillea may refer to the following Grevillea species from Australia:

- Grevillea dimorpha, endemic to Victoria
- Grevillea excelsior, endemic to Western Australia
- Grevillea pungens, endemic to the Northern Territory
