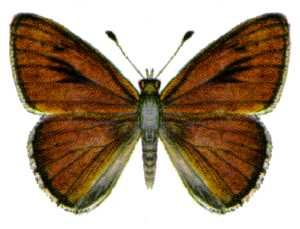

Scientific classification
- Domain: Eukaryota
- Kingdom: Animalia
- Phylum: Arthropoda
- Class: Insecta
- Order: Lepidoptera
- Family: Lycaenidae
- Genus: Candalides
- Species: C. cyprotus

Binomial name
- Candalides cyprotus (Olliff, 1886)

Synonyms
- Chrysophanus cyprotus Olliff, 1886; Holochila purpurea Grose-Smith & Kirby, 1897

= Candalides cyprotus =

Species of butterfly

Candalides cyprotus, the cyprotus blue or copper pencil-blue, is a species of butterfly of the family Lycaenidae. It is found along the east coast of Australia, including South Australia, New South Wales, Western Australia and Victoria.

The wingspan is about 30 mm.

The larvae have been recorded feeding on Conospermum taxifolium, Grevillea huegelii, Grevillea bracteosa, Grevillea juniperina, Hakea leucoptera and Jacksonia scoparia. Pupation takes place in a black pupa with a length of about 13 mm.

It normally takes flight from mid-September to mid-December, but will start earlier in more northern, hotter sections of their range.

== Subspecies ==
- Candalides cyprotus cyprotus - cyprotus blue (New South Wales to Western Australia)
- Candalides cyprotus pallescens (Tite, 1963) (southern Queensland)
