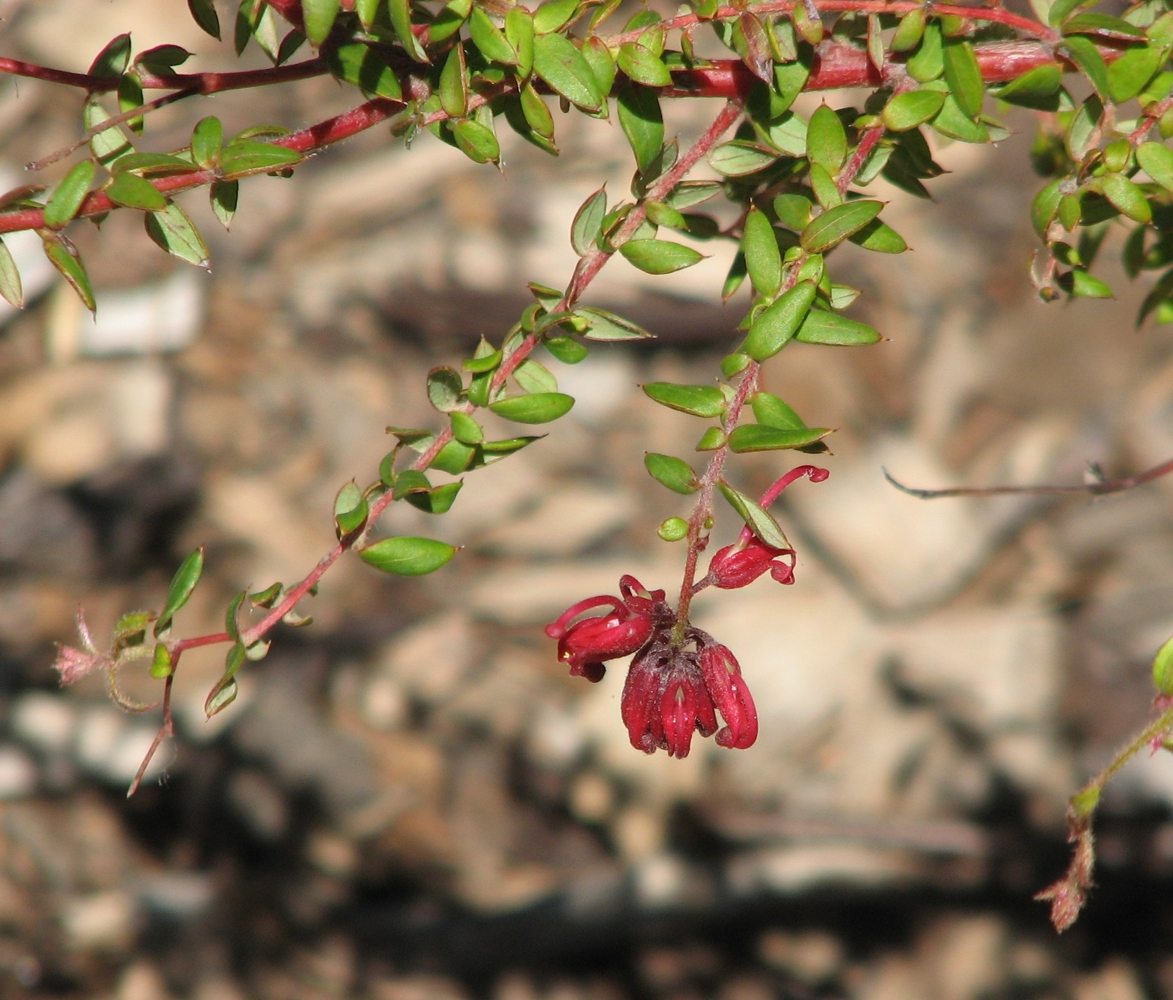
- Grevillea oldei

Scientific classification
- Kingdom: Plantae
- Clade: Tracheophytes
- Clade: Angiosperms
- Clade: Eudicots
- Order: Proteales
- Family: Proteaceae
- Genus: Grevillea
- Species: G. oldei

Binomial name
- Grevillea oldei McGill.

= Grevillea oldei =

Species of shrub

Grevillea oldei is a species of flowering plant in the family Proteaceae and is endemic to a small area of eastern New South Wales. It is a diffuse shrub with narrowly egg-shaped to more or less triangular leaves, and red flowers.

== Description ==
Grevillea oldei is a diffuse shrub that typically grows to a height of 0.4–1.2 m (1 ft 4 in – 3 ft 11 in). It often has arching branches and shaggy-hairy branchlets. Its leaves are narrowly egg-shaped to more or less triangular, lance-shaped, narrowly elliptic or oblong, mostly 10–35 mm (0.39–1.38 in) long and 1.5–6 mm (0.059–0.236 in) wide with the edges turned down and usually sharply pointed. The lower surface of the leaves is covered with loose, untidy, shaggy hairs. The flowers are arranged on the ends of branches in more or less spherical clusters on a wiry, sometimes branched peduncle up to 50 mm (2.0 in) long. The flowers are bright to dark red, the pistil 9.5–15 mm (0.37–0.59 in) long. Flowering occurs from June to February and the fruit is a glabrous, oblong follicle 14–15 mm (0.55–0.59 in) long.

Plants of this species have previously been misidentified as either Grevillea juniperina subsp trinervis or G. capitellata.

== Taxonomy ==
Grevillea oldei was first formally described in 1986 by Donald McGillivray in his book New Names in Grevillea (Proteaceae) from specimens collected by Charles William Edwin (Ted) Moore near Ourimbah in 1972. The specific epithet (oldei) honours Peter M. Olde.

== Distribution and habitat ==
This grevillea grows in woodland or heath between Mangrove Mountain and Woy Woy in eastern New South Wales.
