= Mountain grevillea =

Mountain grevillea may refer to:

- Grevillea alpina
- Grevillea montana
- Grevillea victoriae
