= Styphelia riparia =

Scientific classification
- Kingdom: Plantae
- Clade: Tracheophytes
- Clade: Angiosperms
- Clade: Eudicots
- Clade: Asterids
- Order: Ericales
- Family: Ericaceae
- Genus: Styphelia
- Species: S. riparia

Binomial name
- Styphelia riparia (N.A.Wakef.) J.H.Willis
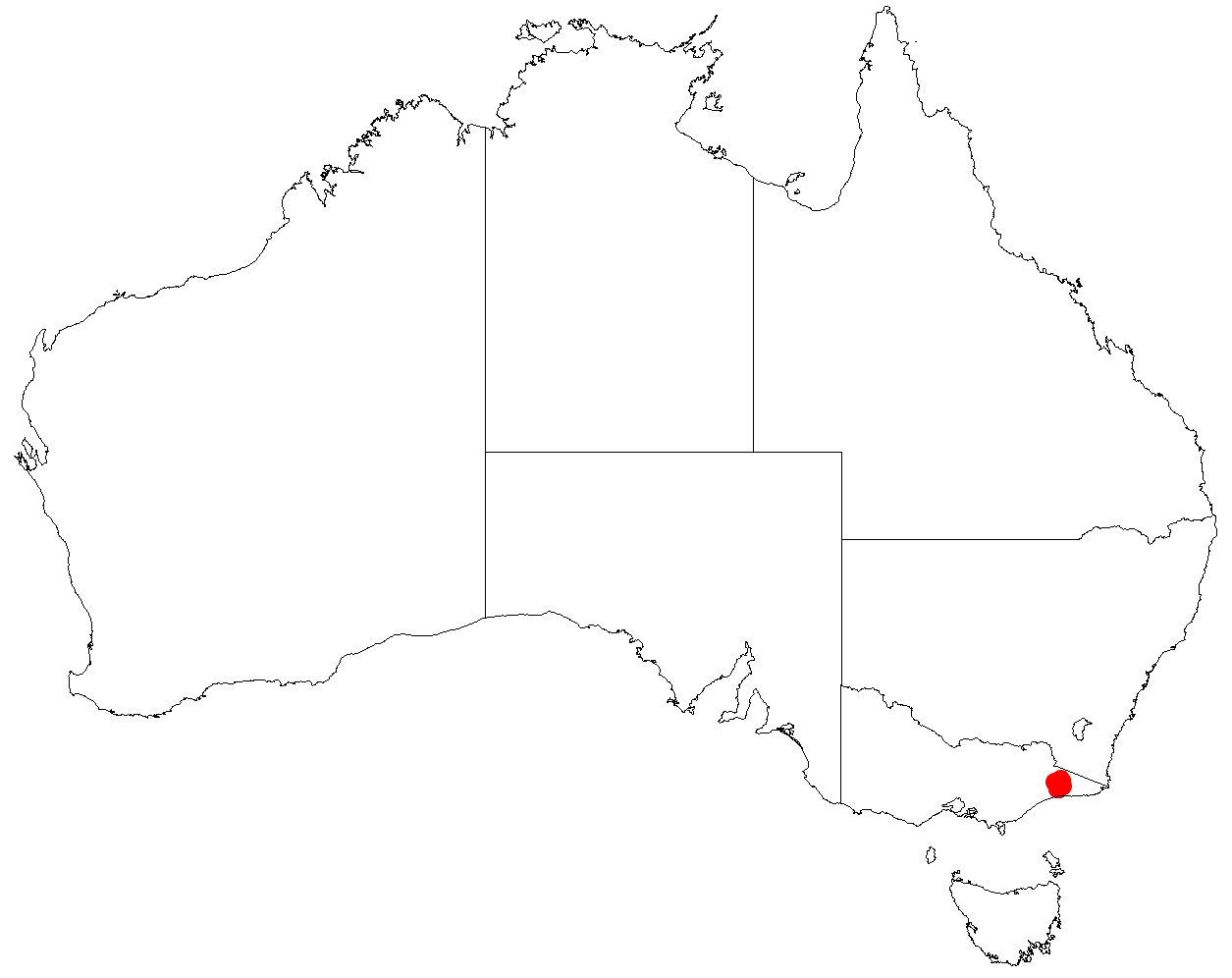
- Occurrence data from AVH

Synonyms
- Leucopogon riparius N.A.Wakef.

Species of plant

Styphelia riparia is a species of flowering plant in the heath family Ericaceae and is endemic to eastern Victoria in Australia. It is an erect shrub with narrowly elliptic to narrowly egg-shaped leaves, the narrower end towards the base, and white, tube-shaped flowers arranged in groups of 3 to 5 in leaf axils.

== Description ==
Styphelia riparia is an erect shrub that typically grows to a height of 1–2 m (3 ft 3 in – 6 ft 7 in), its young branchlets covered with soft hairs. The leaves are narrowly elliptic to narrowly egg-shaped with the narrower end towards the base, 11–18 mm (0.43–0.71 in) long and 1.6–3.2 mm (0.063–0.126 in) wide. Both sides of the leaves are the same shade of green, the lower surface is usually rough and there are minute teeth on the edges. The flowers are borne in spikes of 3 to 5 about 4 mm (0.16 in) long in leaf axils with egg-shaped bracts 1.0–1.5 mm (0.039–0.059 in) long at the base. The sepals are egg-shaped, 1.5–2.2 mm (0.059–0.087 in) long, the petals white, 4–5 mm (0.16–0.20 in) long and joined at the base, forming a tube, the lobes longer than the petal tube. Flowering occurs in September, and the fruit is about 3 mm (0.12 in) long and slightly hairy.

== Taxonomy ==
This species was first formally described in 1956 by Norman Wakefield who gave it the name Leucopogon riparius in The Victorian Naturalist from specimens he collected near the Snowy River in 1947. In 1967, James Hamlyn Willis transferred the species to Styphelia as S. riparia in the journal Muelleria. The specific epithet (riparius) means "riverside".

== Distribution ==
Styphelia riparius is only known from the rocky banks of the Snowy River from Tulloch Ard Gorge, east of W Tree to near its junction with the Buchan River in eastern Victoria.
