= Grevillea × semperflorens =

Flowering plant cultivar

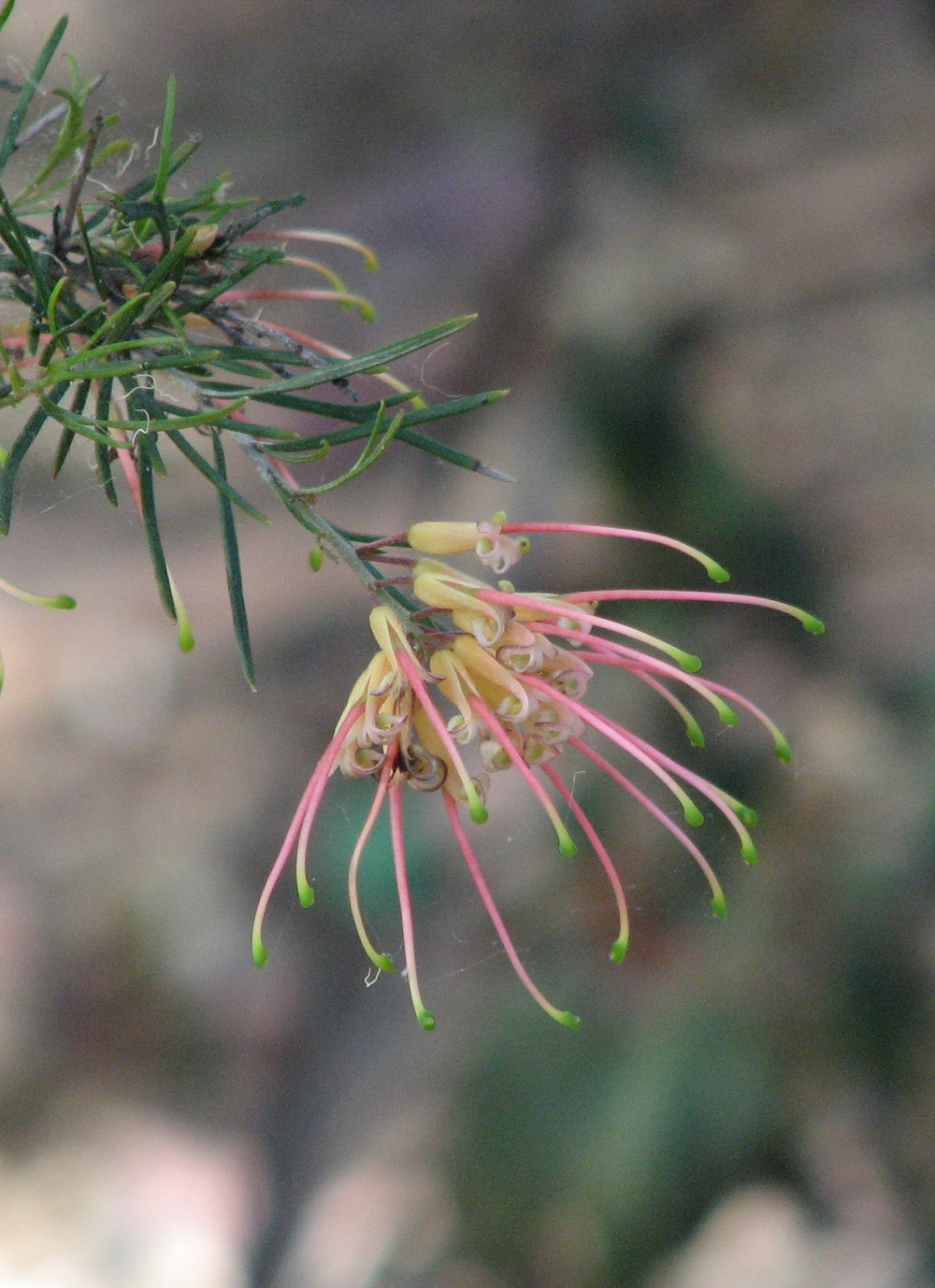
- Hybrid parentage: Grevillea thelemanniana × Grevillea juniperina var. sulphureum
- Cultivar: x semperflorens
- Origin: England

Grevillea × semperflorens is a grevillea cultivar originating from England. It grows up to about 2 metres in height and has yellow-green flowers. It flowers almost all year round, often even throughout the whole year, and its specific epithet means "always flowering".

The cultivar was first formally described in 1937 by F.E. Briggs in The Journal of the Royal Horticultural Society of London as Grevillea semperflorens.

== See also ==
- List of Grevillea cultivars
