= Grevillea 'Poorinda Queen' =

Flowering plant cultivar

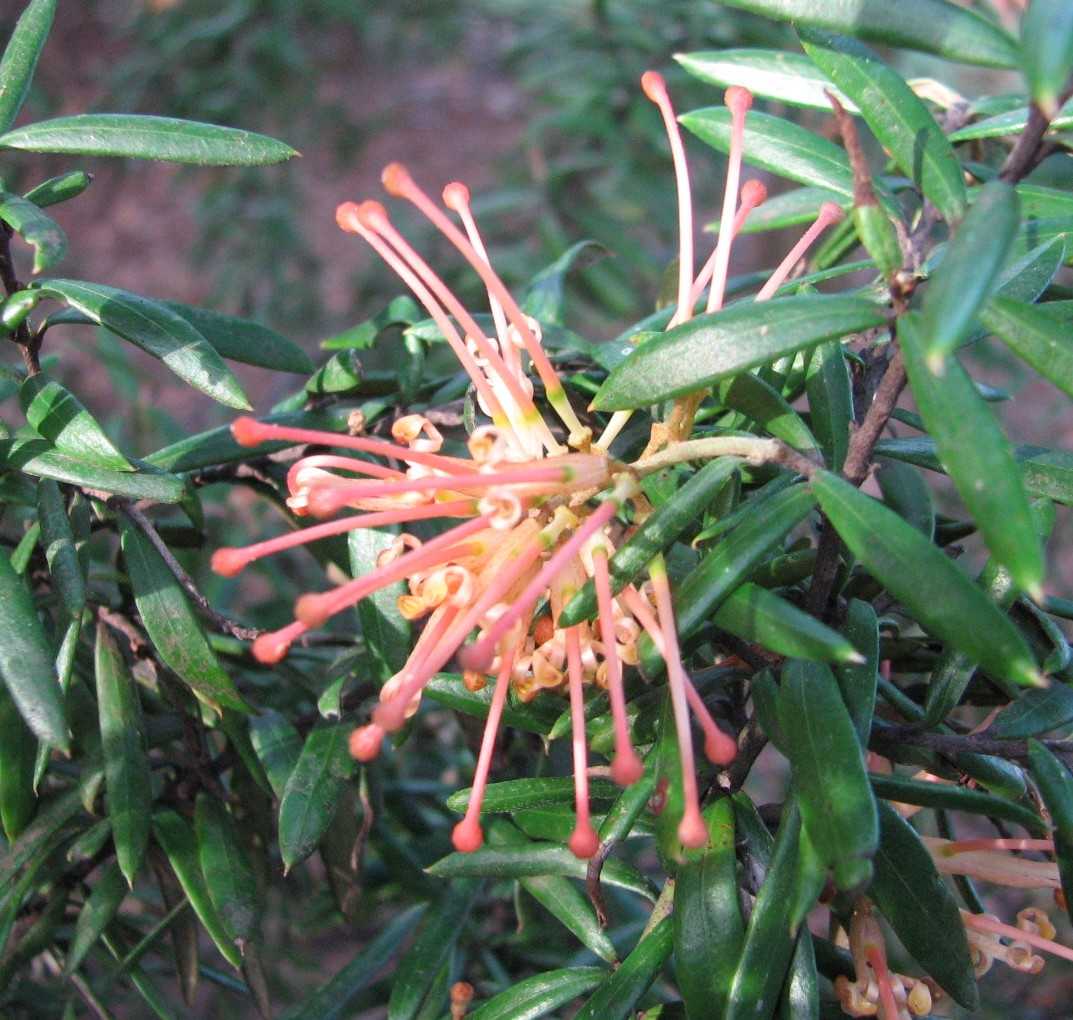
- Hybrid parentage: Grevillea juniperina × Grevillea victoriae
- Cultivar: 'Poorinda Queen'
- Origin: Selected by Leo Hodge

Grevillea 'Poorinda Queen' is a grevillea cultivar that originates from Australia.

It is a shrub that grows to 4 metres in height and has sharply-tipped leaves that are 20 to 25 millimeters long and 5 mm wide. The apricot pink inflorescences are produced in clusters at the end of the branches.

The cultivar, which is a cross between a New South Wales form of Grevillea juniperina and a yellow flowering Victorian form of G. victoriae, was selected by Leo Hodge in 1952.

The cultivar is similar in appearance to G. 'Poorinda Constance' though the latter has red flowers and also G. 'Poorinda Leane' which is distinguished by its longer leaves and more spreading habit.

The cultivar contains phenolic glycosides that have been found to produce in vitro antimalarial activity.

== See also ==
- List of Grevillea cultivars
