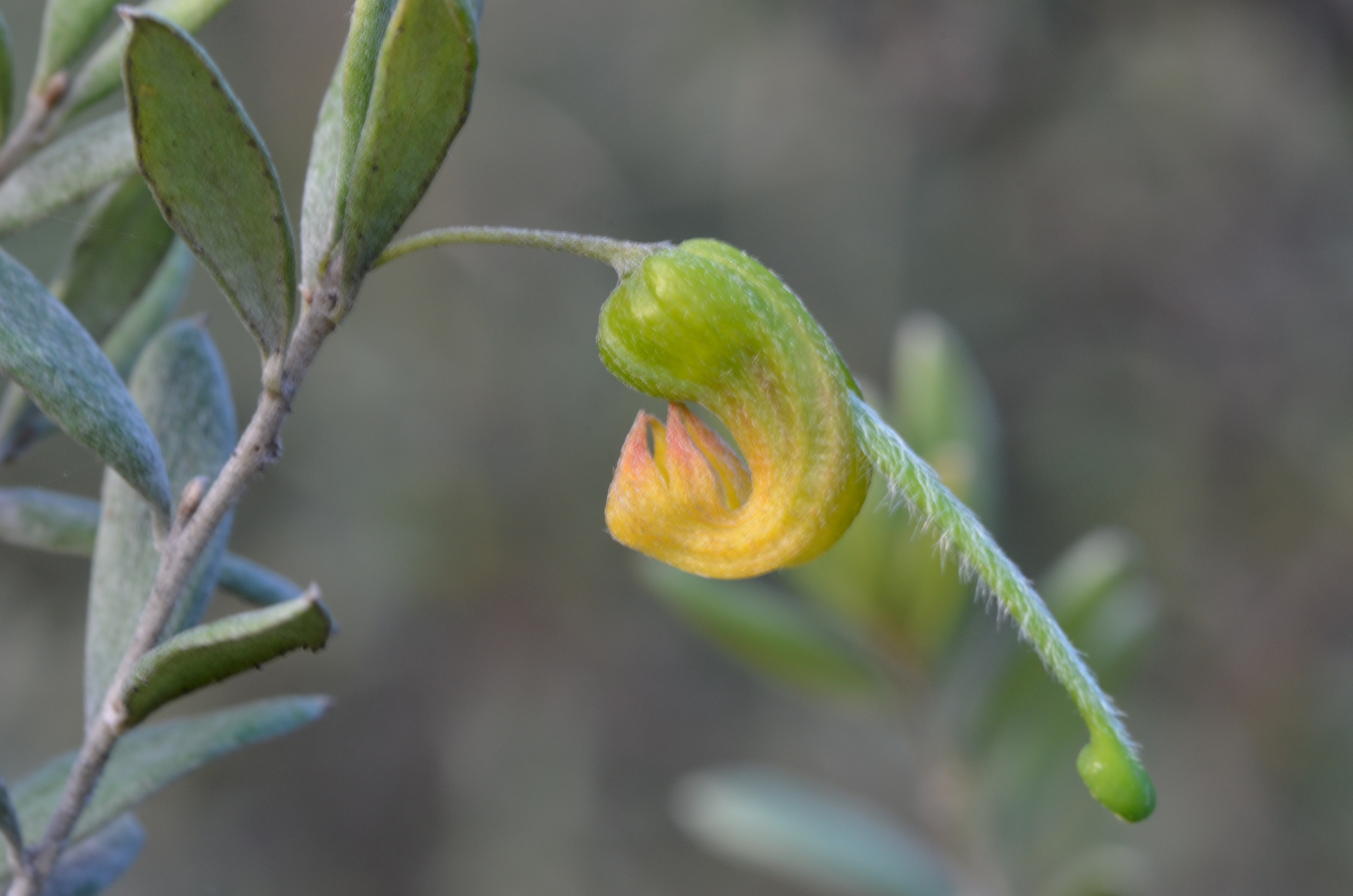
- Flower
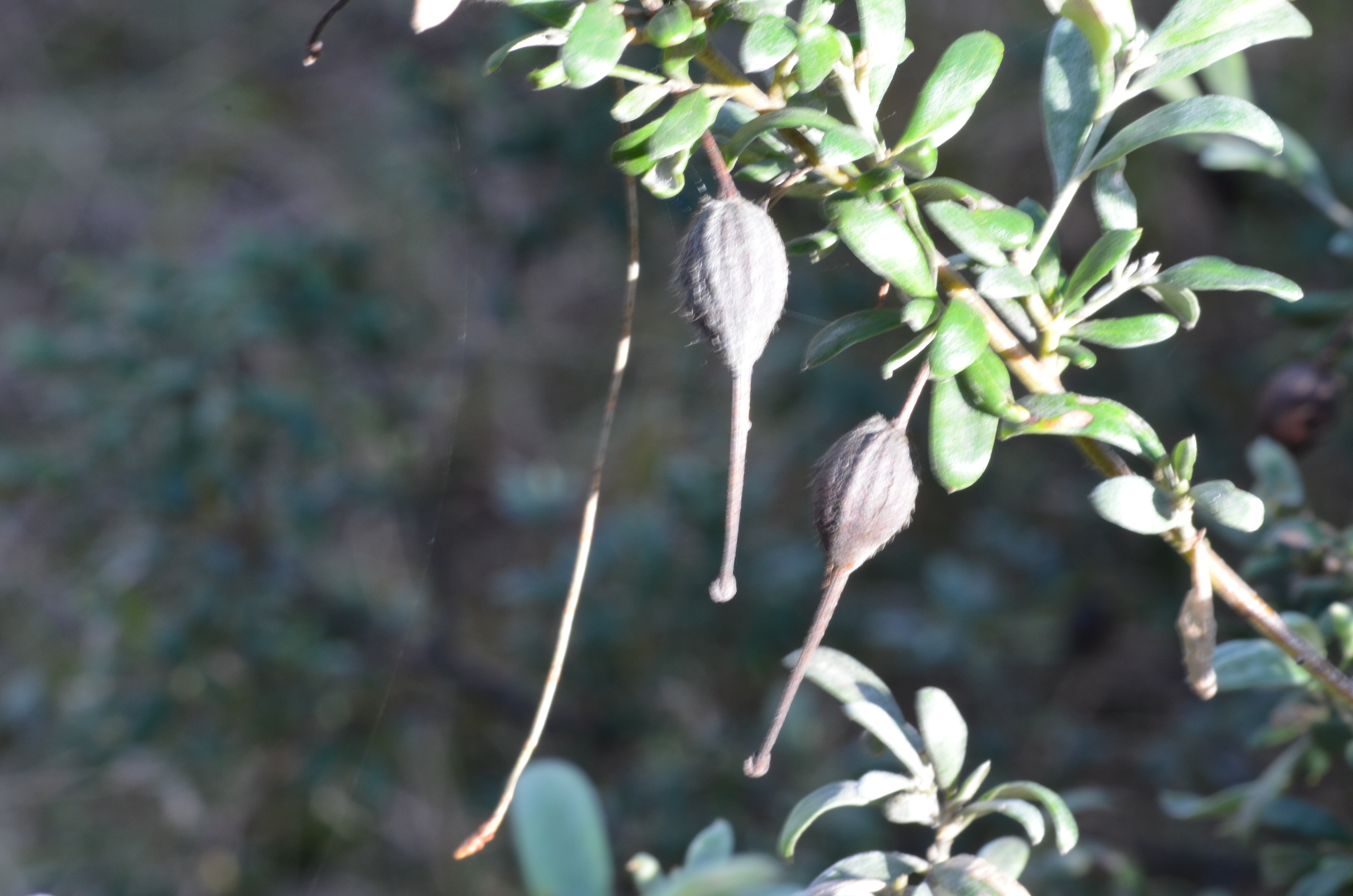
- Fruit

Conservation status
- Least Concern (IUCN 3.1)

Scientific classification
- Kingdom: Plantae
- Clade: Tracheophytes
- Clade: Angiosperms
- Clade: Eudicots
- Order: Proteales
- Family: Proteaceae
- Genus: Grevillea
- Species: G. montana

Binomial name
- Grevillea montana R.Br.

Synonyms
- Grevillea arenaria subsp. montana (R.Br.) McGill.; Grevillea uniflora Meisn. nom. inval., pro syn.

= Grevillea montana =

Species of plant endemic to Australia

Grevillea montana is a species of flowering plant in the family Proteaceae and is endemic to a restricted to a small area of eastern New South Wales. It is a dense shrub with narrowly elliptic to lance-shaped leaves and bright green and pinkish-red flowers.

== Description ==
Grevillea montana is a dense shrub that typically grows to a height of 0.3–1.5 m (1 ft 0 in – 4 ft 11 in). Its leaves are narrowly elliptic to lance-shaped with the narrower end towards the base, or more or less linear, mostly 10–30 mm (0.39–1.18 in) long and 1–7 mm (0.039–0.276 in) wide with the edges turned down or rolled under, often covering the silky-hairy lower surface. The flowers are arranged singly or in clusters of up to four on the ends of branches and are bright green at the base and pinkish-red near the ends with a green style, the pistil 25–28 mm (0.98–1.10 in) long. Flowering mainly occurs in September and October, and the fruit is an oval to elliptic follicle about 12 mm (0.47 in) long.

=== Similar species ===
Grevillea montana is closely related to G. arenaria and was once classified as a subspecies of the genus. G. montana can be distinguished from G. arenaria in that it has 1–4 flowers on 3–4 mm long pedicels and 1–3cm long leaves with a close cover of silky, appressed hairs on the underside. G. arenaria has 2–10 flowers on pedicels 9–10 mm long and leaves 1.5–7.5 mm long with curled, wooly hairs on the underside.

== Taxonomy ==
Grevillea montana was first formally described in 1810 by Robert Brown in Transactions of the Linnean Society of London. The specific epithet (montana) means "pertaining to mountains".

== Distribution and habitat ==
The species is known from the southern Hunter Region of New South Wales, from Denman to Kurri Kurri, where it occurs in open forests in sandy soils.

== Conservation status ==
G. montana is listed as least concern on the IUCN Red List of Threatened Species. Although it has a limited distribution, it is moderately abundant within its range. Though there is likely a small population decline, current threats have not been observed to impact the general population in a way that warrants a threatened category. The main threat to this species is current and historical habitat destruction for coal mining and urban development.
