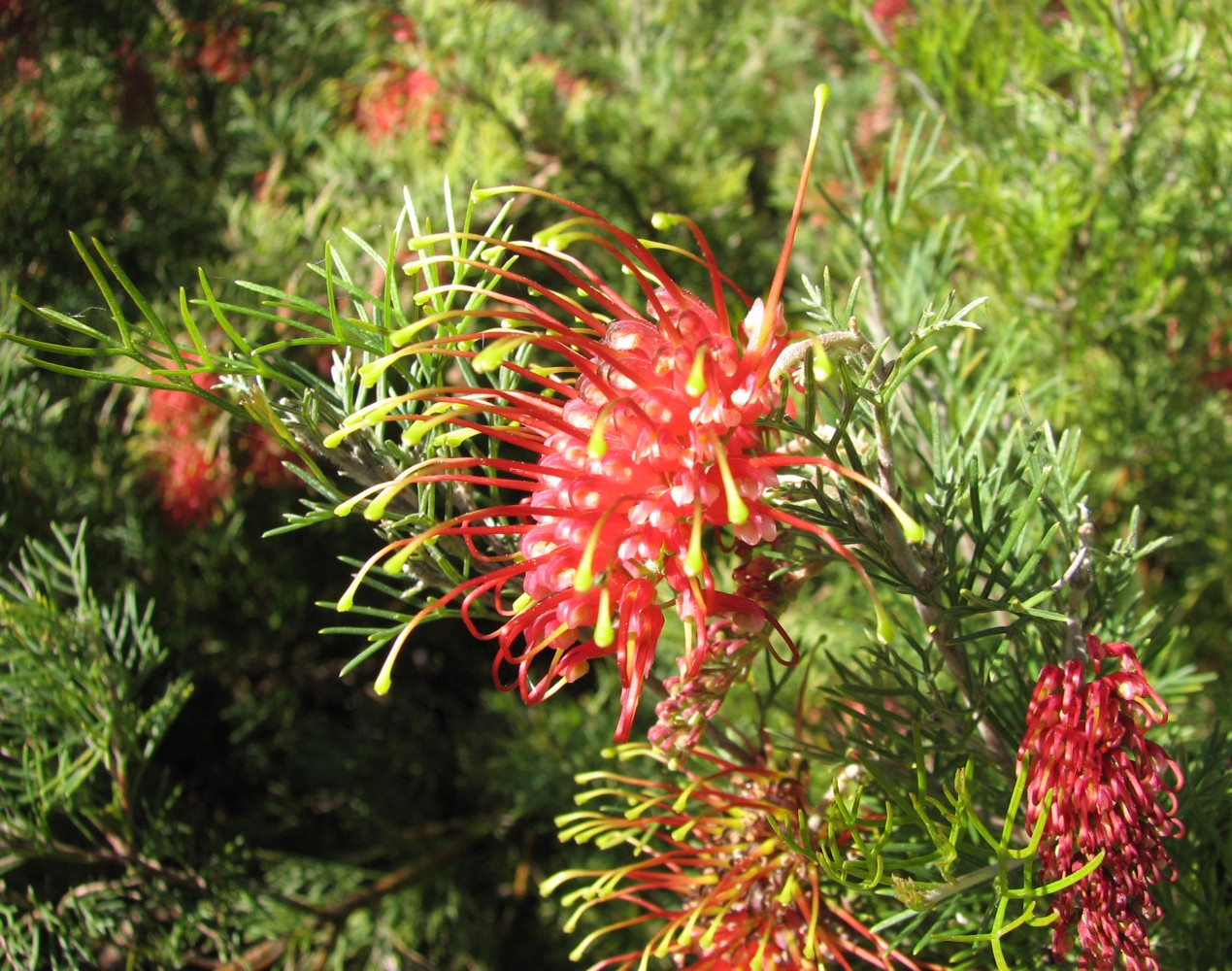
- In Geelong Botanic Gardens

Conservation status
- Critically endangered (EPBC Act)

Scientific classification
- Kingdom: Plantae
- Clade: Embryophytes
- Clade: Tracheophytes
- Clade: Angiosperms
- Clade: Eudicots
- Order: Proteales
- Family: Proteaceae
- Genus: Grevillea
- Species: G. thelemanniana

Binomial name
- Grevillea thelemanniana Hügel ex Endl.

Synonyms
- Grevillea thelemaniana Lindl. orth. var.; Grevillea thelemanniana Hügel ex Lindl. nom. illeg.; Grevillea thelemanniana Hügel ex Endl. subsp. thelemanniana; Hakea thelemanniana (Hügel ex Endl.) Christenh. & Byng

= Grevillea thelemanniana =

Species of shrub endemic to Western Australia

Grevillea thelemanniana, commonly known as spider net grevillea, is species of flowering plant in the family Proteaceae and is endemic to Perth, Western Australia. It is a spreading shrub with linear and pinnatipartite to pinnatisect leaves with linear to narrowly elliptic lobes, and clusters of 6 to 14 pinkish-red and cream-coloured flowers with a red, green-tipped style.

== Description ==
Grevillea thelemanniana is a spreading shrub that typically grows to 0.5–1 m (1 ft 8 in – 3 ft 3 in) high and 1–2.5 m (3 ft 3 in – 8 ft 2 in) or more wide. Its leaves are linear and pinnatipartite to pinnatisect, 25–45 mm (0.98–1.77 in) long with 2 to 5 lobes, the end lobes of the divided leaves 2–8 mm (0.079–0.315 in) long, the linear leaves and the end lobes of the divided leaves are 1.0–1.5 mm (0.039–0.059 in) wide. The upper surface of the leaves is more or less glabrous, the edges of the leaves are down-curved or rolled under, and the lower surface is silky-hairy. The flowers are borne in cylindrical clusters of 6 to 14 on one side of a raceme 5–15 mm (0.20–0.59 in) long. The flowers are pinkish red and cream-coloured, the style red with a green tip, and the pistil is 24–28 mm (0.94–1.10 in) long. Flowering occurs from July to October and the fruit is an oblong to elliptic follicle 12–13 mm (0.47–0.51 in) long.

== Taxonomy ==
Grevillea thelemanniana was first formally described in 1839 by Stephan Endlicher in Novarum Stirpium Decades, from an unpublished description by Charles von Hügel. The specific epithet (thelemanniana) honours C. Thelemann, a Viennese gardener.

== Distribution and habitat ==
Spider net grevillea grows in winter-wet swampy heath in the Cannington, Kenwick and Wattle Grove suburbs of Perth, Western Australia.

== Ecology ==
Grevillea thelemanniana is a calcicole hyper-endemic confined to seasonally wet flats with shallow, calcareous clay soils over limestone on the eastern edge of the Swan Coastal Plain. It occurs primarily within the Melaleuca brevifolia and Samolus junceus floristic community, where it is a dominant or consistent species in multiple distinct community architectures, including open Melaleuca shrublands over sedgelands and low open heaths.

Physiologically, it is distinct among Proteaceae in the accumulation of trans-aconitate within the epidermal cells and spongy mesophyll cells of its leaves. Trans-aconitate is a carboxylate compound which also acts as a herbivorous feeding deterrent. In thelemanniana the trans-aconitate is accumulated in high concentrations to balance non-crystalline calcium and prevent ionic stress caused by high rhizosphere calcium availability and uptake. Notably, this appears to be the first documented case of a calcicole species using elevated calcium levels to physiologically support the accumulation of an anti-metabolite.

== Conservation status ==
Grevillea thelemanniana is listed as critically endangered under the Australian Government Environment Protection and Biodiversity Conservation Act 1999 and as threatened by the Western Australian Government Department of Biodiversity, Conservation and Attractions, meaning that it is in danger of extinction.
