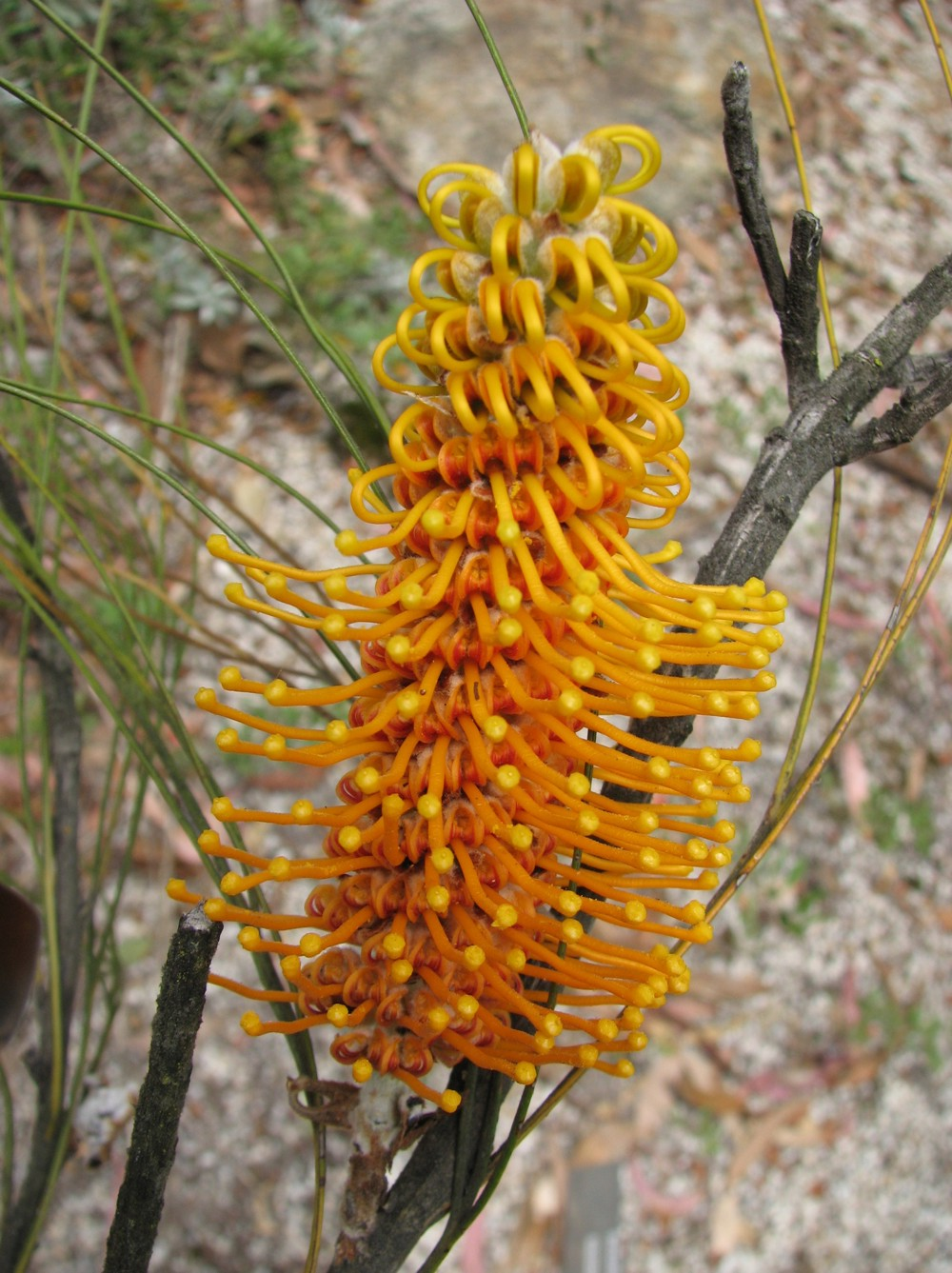
- Grevillea excelsior in Maranoa Gardens

Conservation status
- Least Concern (IUCN 3.1)

Scientific classification
- Kingdom: Plantae
- Clade: Embryophytes
- Clade: Tracheophytes
- Clade: Spermatophytes
- Clade: Angiosperms
- Clade: Eudicots
- Order: Proteales
- Family: Proteaceae
- Genus: Grevillea
- Species: G. excelsior

Binomial name
- Grevillea excelsior Diels

= Grevillea excelsior =

Species of shrub endemic to Western Australia

Grevillea excelsior, commonly known as flame grevillea or orange flame grevillea, is a species of flowering plant in the family Proteaceae and is endemic to the south-west of Western Australia. It is an erect shrub or small tree with usually divided leaves with linear lobes, and clusters of orange flowers.

== Description ==
Grevillea excelsior is an erect shrub or tree that typically grows to a height of 1–8 m (3 ft 3 in – 26 ft 3 in) and has a leafy base with emergent flower spikes. The leaves are 50–300 mm (2.0–11.8 in) long and usually divided with two to seven linear lobes, sometimes divided again. The undivided leaves and lobes are mostly 1–2 mm (0.039–0.079 in) wide with the edges rolled under, enclosing the lower surface apart from the midvein. The flowers are arranged in conical to oblong clusters on a peduncle 10–40 mm (0.39–1.57 in) long, the rachis 80–200 mm (3.1–7.9 in) long. The flowers are pale orange on the outside, brighter inside, with a bright orange style, the pistil 20–29 mm (0.79–1.14 in) long. Flowering mainly occurs from August to November and the fruit is a hairy follicle 15–22 mm (0.59–0.87 in) long.

== Taxonomy ==
Grevillea excelsior was first formally described in 1904 by Ludwig Diels in Ernst Georg Pritzel's Botanische Jahrbücher für Systematik, Pflanzengeschichte und Pflanzengeographie. The specific epithet (excelsior) means "taller".

== Distribution and habitat ==
Flame grevillea grows in mallee heath and is widespread in inland areas of south-western Western Australia between Quairading, Wongan Hills, Coolgardie and the Peak Charles National Park.

== Conservation status ==
Grevillea excelsior is listed as least concern on the IUCN Red List of Threatened Species and as not threatened by the Government of Western Australia Department of Biodiversity, Conservation and Attractions.

This species is widely distributed where it is locally common and has a mostly stable population. Habitat clearance for agriculture has reduced this species' range and population in the past, though this no longer occurs and the population has now stabilised. Currently, there are no known major threats to this species and no conservation measures are required.
