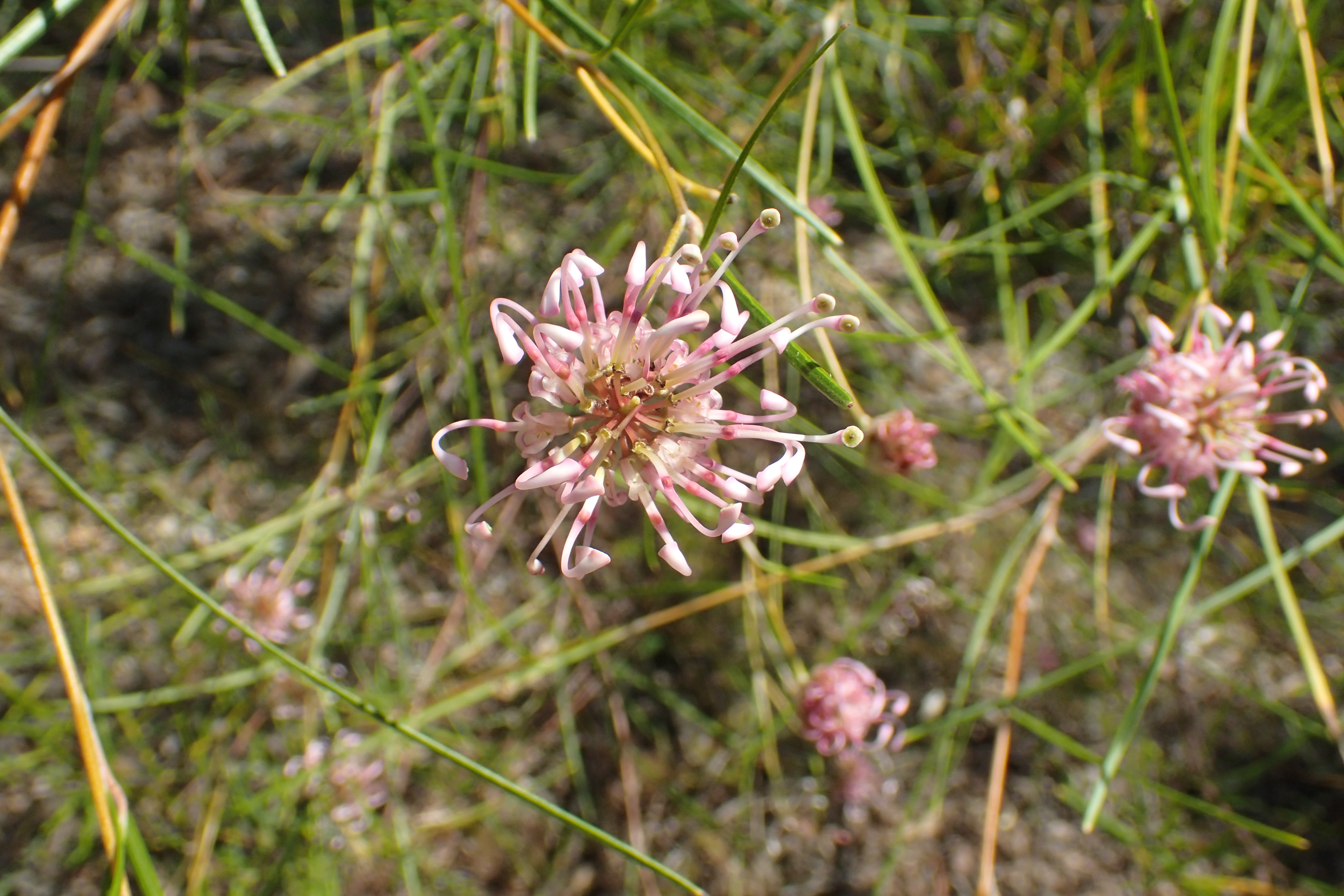
- Grevillea bracteosa in Kings Park Perth

Scientific classification
- Kingdom: Plantae
- Clade: Embryophytes
- Clade: Tracheophytes
- Clade: Spermatophytes
- Clade: Angiosperms
- Clade: Eudicots
- Order: Proteales
- Family: Proteaceae
- Genus: Grevillea
- Species: G. bracteosa

Binomial name
- Grevillea bracteosa Meisn.

= Grevillea bracteosa =

Bracted grevillea

Species of shrub endemic to Western Australia

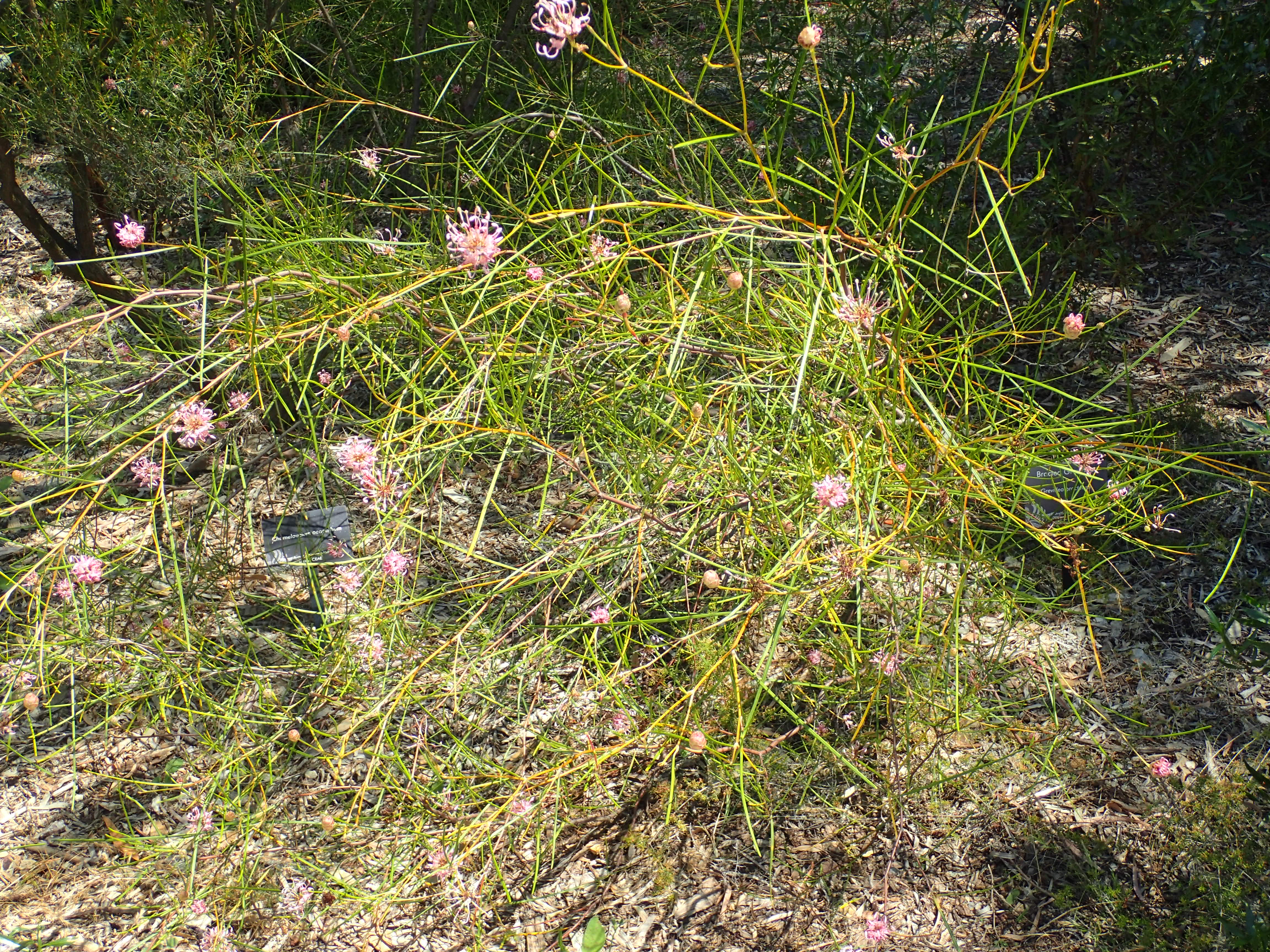
Habit

Grevillea bracteosa, also known as bracted grevillea, is a species of flowering plant in the family Proteaceae and is endemic to the south-west of Western Australia. It is an erect to spreading shrub usually with linear leaves, and oval to more or less spherical clusters of glabrous pale green to greenish-pink flowers with a pink or white style.

== Description ==
Grevillea bracteosa is an erect to spreading shrub that typically grows to a height of 0.5 to 2 metres (1.6 to 6.6 ft) but does not form a lignotuber. The leaves are mostly linear, 50 to 140 millimetres (2.0 to 5.5 in) long and 1 to 2 millimetres (0.04 to 0.08 in) wide with the edges rolled under, and two longitudinal grooves on the lower surface. The flowers are arranged in oval or more or less spherical clusters at the ends of stems, on a rachis 8–15 mm (0.31–0.59 in) long, and are pale green to greenish pink with a deep rose-pink to pale pink or white style. The pistil is 16–23 mm (0.63–0.91 in) long and glabrous. Flowering occurs from August to October and the fruit is a glabrous oval follicle 12–15 mm (0.47–0.59 in) long.

== Taxonomy ==
Grevillea bracteosa was first formally described in 1848 by Carl Meissner in Johann Georg Christian Lehmann's Plantae Preissianae from specimens collected in the Swan River Colony by James Drummond. The specific epithet (bracteosa) means "having many or large bracts".

In 2008, Peter M. Olde and Neil R. Marriott described two subspecies in the journal Nuytsia and the names are accepted by the Australian Plant Census:

- Grevillea bracteosa Meisn. subsp. bracteosa has a floral rachis 3–5 mm (0.12–0.20 in) long and pedicels 0.18–2.5 mm (0.0071–0.0984 in) long;
- Grevillea bracteosa subsp. howatharra Olde & Marriott has a floral rachis 8–12 mm (0.31–0.47 in) long and pedicels mostly 4.0–5.75 mm (0.157–0.226 in) long.

== Distribution and habitat ==
Bracted grevillea grows in shrubland and sometimes heath and is found from near Geraldton to near Mogumber in the Avon Wheatbelt, Geraldton Sandplains and Jarrah Forest biogeographic regions of south-western Western Australia.

== Conservation status ==
Both subspecies of G. bracteosa are listed as threatened flora (declared rare flora — extant) by the Department of Biodiversity, Conservation and Attractions.

== Use in horticulture ==
This species of grevillea will grow in a wide range of well-drained soils and is frost and dought tolerant once established.
