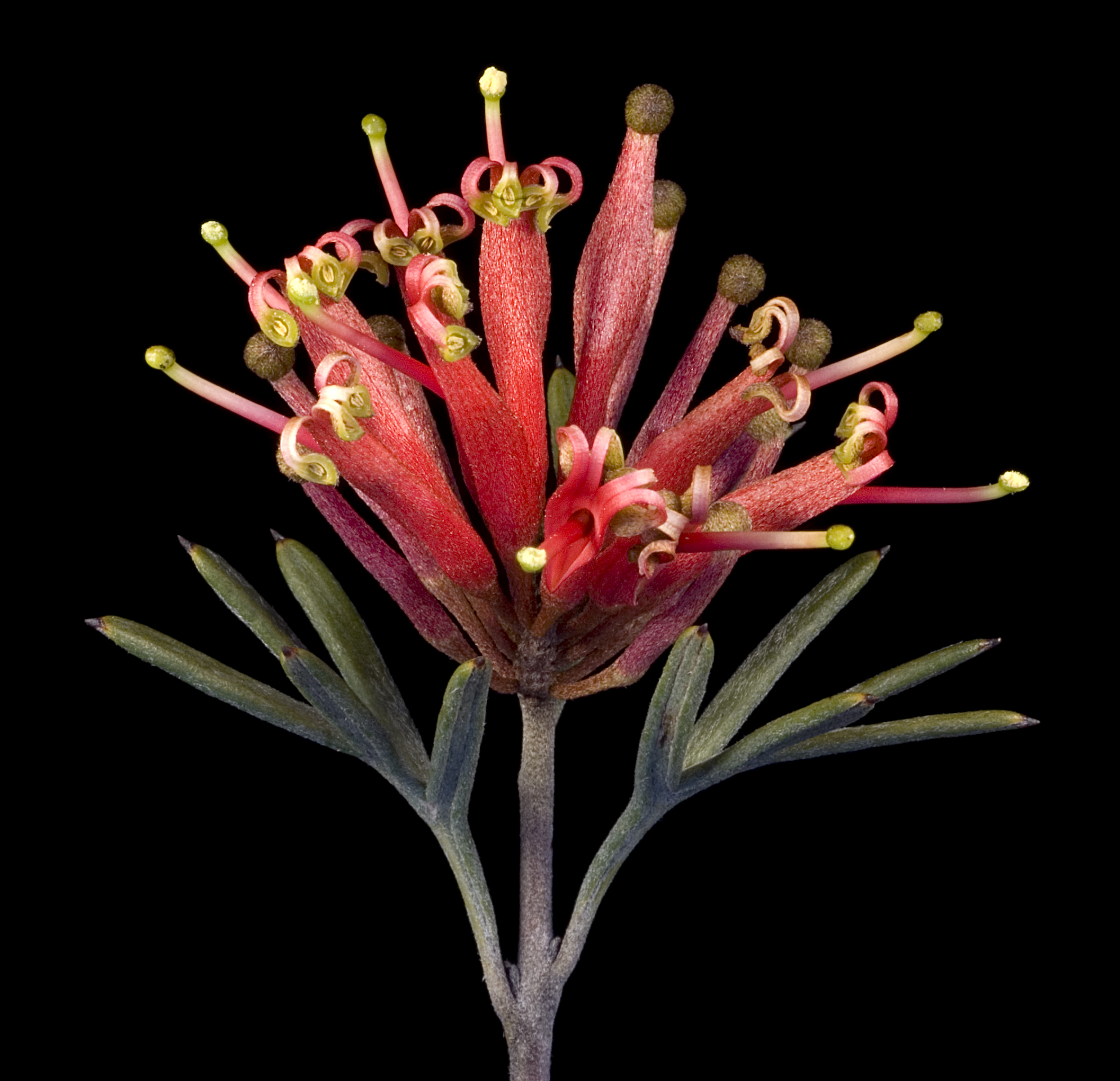

Conservation status
- Least Concern (IUCN 3.1)

Scientific classification
- Kingdom: Plantae
- Clade: Embryophytes
- Clade: Tracheophytes
- Clade: Angiosperms
- Clade: Eudicots
- Order: Proteales
- Family: Proteaceae
- Genus: Grevillea
- Species: G. huegelii

Binomial name
- Grevillea huegelii Meisn.

Synonyms
- Grevillea rigidissima F.Muell. ex Meisn.

= Grevillea huegelii =

Species of shrub endemic to southern Australia

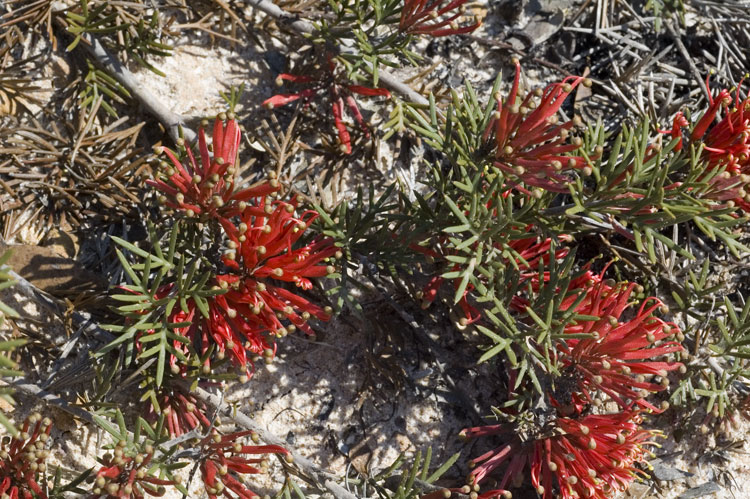
Habit near Ravensthorpe

Grevillea huegelii, commonly known as comb spider-flower or comb grevillea, is a species of flowering plant in the family Proteaceae and is endemic to southern continental Australia. It is an erect to low-lying shrub with divided leaves with mostly three to eleven sharply-pointed linear lobes, and clusters of red to pink flowers that are silky-hairy on the outside.

== Description ==
Grevillea huegelii is an erect to low-lying or straggling shrub that typically grows up to 3 m (9.8 ft) high and 4 m (13 ft) wide. Its leaves are 10–60 mm (0.39–2.36 in) long and 7–65 mm (0.28–2.56 in) wide in outline with mostly three to eleven sharply-pointed, linear lobes 5–40 mm (0.20–1.57 in) long and 0.7–2.2 mm (0.028–0.087 in) wide, the edges rolled under obscuring most of the lower surface. The flowers are arranged in loose clusters on a silky-hairy rachis usually 5–14 mm (0.20–0.55 in) long, the perianth straight, red to pink and silky-hairy on the outside, the pistil 19–29 mm (0.75–1.14 in) long. Flowering occurs in most months with a peak from July to December, and the fruit is a glabrous follicle 10–12 mm (0.39–0.47 in) long.

== Taxonomy ==
Grevillea huegelii was first formally described in 1845 by Carl Meissner in Johann Georg Christian Lehmann's Plantae Preissianae from specimens collected near the Avon River, near York in 1839. The specific epithet (huegelii) honours Charles von Hügel.

== Distribution and habitat ==
Comb spider-flower grows in a variety of habitats, including mallee woodland and heath and has a disjunct distribution in southern continental Australia. In Western Australia it is widespread from Moora to Borden and east to Cundeelee and Balladonia. It is also widespread in the southern half of South Australia, the north-west of Victoria and in western New South Wales.

== Conservation status ==
Grevillea huegelii is listed as least concern on the IUCN Red List of Threatened Species and as not threatened by the Western Australian Government Department of Biodiversity, Conservation and Attractions.

The species has experienced rapid declines and significant habitat loss due to land clearing for agricultural purposes. Its population is believed to be declining and it is limited to roadside verges within much of its distribution. However, this threat is not significant enough to warrant a threatened category, as the species has a vast and widespread distribution where it is locally common and substantial habitat remains.
