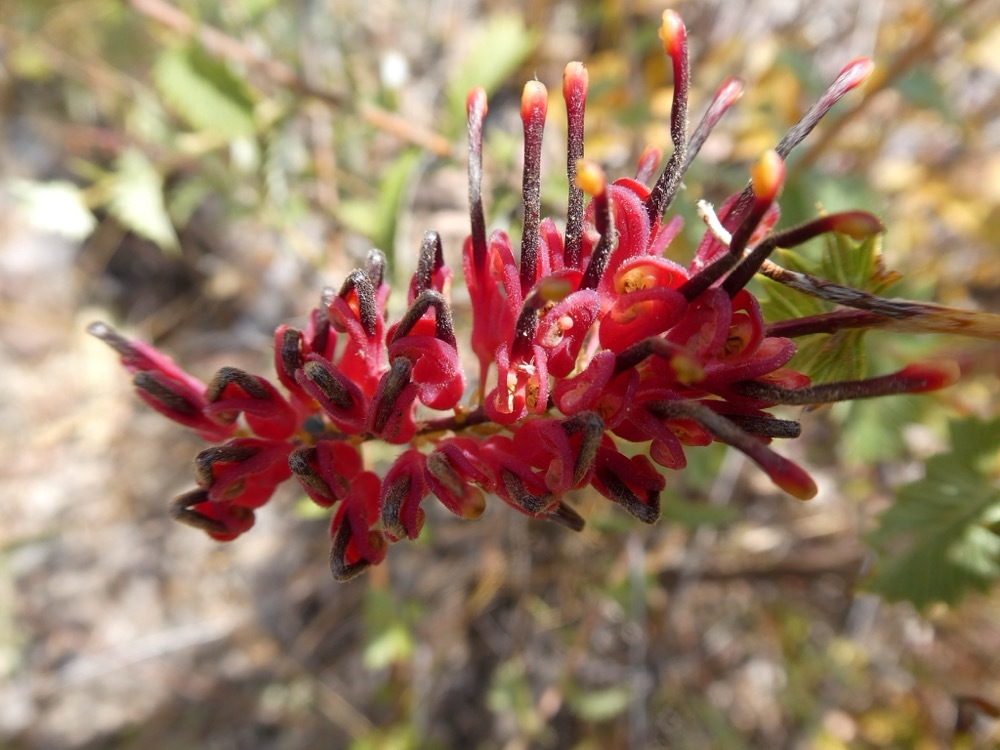
- Grevillea pungens near Nitmiluk National Park

Scientific classification
- Kingdom: Plantae
- Clade: Tracheophytes
- Clade: Angiosperms
- Clade: Eudicots
- Order: Proteales
- Family: Proteaceae
- Genus: Grevillea
- Species: G. pungens

Binomial name
- Grevillea pungens R.Br.

Synonyms
- Grevillea leichardtii S.Moore

= Grevillea pungens =

Flame grevillea

Species of plant endemic to Australia

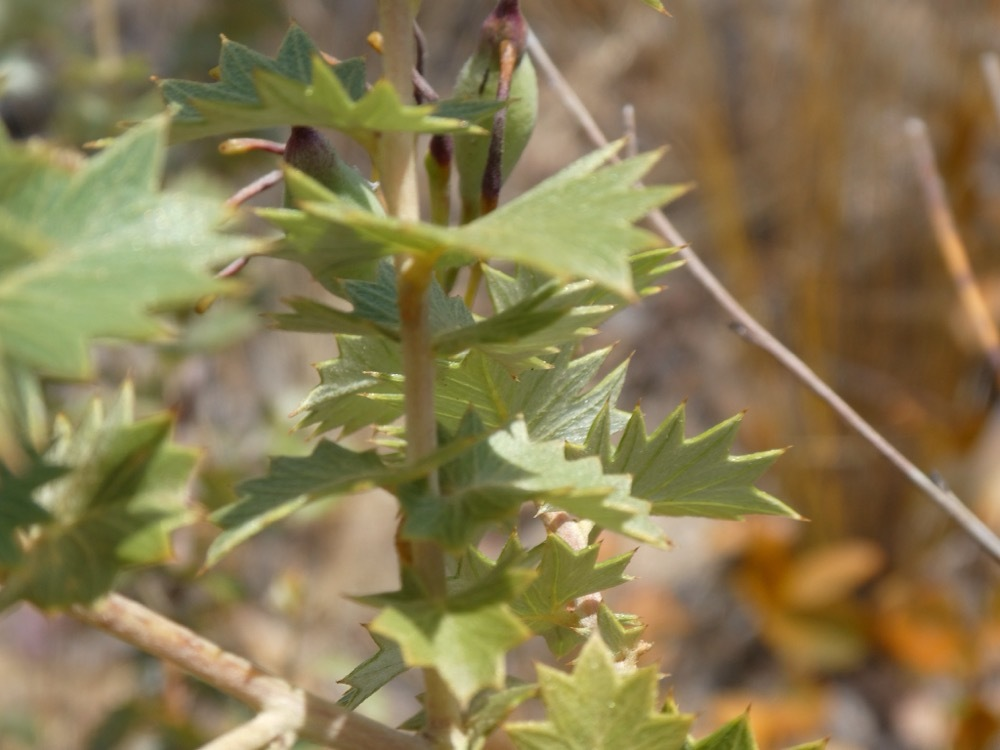
Foliage

Grevillea pungens, also known as flame grevillea, is a species of flowering plant in the family Proteaceae and is endemic to the Northern Territory in Australia. It is a shrub with egg-shaped leaves with rigid, sharply-pointed teeth or lobes, and hairy, deep pink to orange flowers.

== Description ==
Grevillea pungens is a shrub that typically grows to a height of 1–3 m (3 ft 3 in – 9 ft 10 in). Its leaves are egg-shaped to narrowly egg-shaped in outline, 15–85 mm (0.59–3.35 in) long and 15–30 mm (0.59–1.18 in) wide with 6 to 30 sharply-pointed, rigid, linear to triangular lobes or teeth, 5–15 mm (0.20–0.59 in) long. The lower lobes are usually toothed or divided again. The flowers are arranged in groups on one side of a rachis mostly 40–110 mm (1.6–4.3 in) long, the oldest flowers at the base. The flowers are hairy, yellow to pale green in bud, becoming white, pink, orange, red or purplish, the pistil 15.5–17.5 mm (0.61–0.69 in) long. Flowering mainly occurs in the dry season from July to November.

== Taxonomy ==
Grevillea pungens was first formally described in 1810 by Robert Brown in the Transactions of the Linnean Society of London. The specific epithet (pungens) means "sharply pointed".

== Distribution and habitat ==
Flame grevillea occurs in the tropical Top End of the Northern Territory, from Gunbalanya to Gove and the lower Roper River. It grows in open eucalypt woodland on sandy soils, often among rocks or near creeks.
