= Grevillea capitellata =

Conservation status
- Least Concern (IUCN 3.1)

Scientific classification
- Kingdom: Plantae
- Clade: Embryophytes
- Clade: Tracheophytes
- Clade: Spermatophytes
- Clade: Angiosperms
- Clade: Eudicots
- Order: Proteales
- Family: Proteaceae
- Genus: Grevillea
- Species: G. capitellata

Binomial name
- Grevillea capitellata Meisn.

Species of plant endemic to New South Wales, Australia

Grevillea capitellata is a species of flowering plant in the family Proteaceae and is endemic to the Illawarra region of New South Wales. It is a low, dense mounded or prostrate shrub with narrowly elliptic to oblong leaves, and dull, deep crimson to dark maroon flowers.

== Description ==
Grevillea capitellata is dense, mounded or prostrate shrub that typically grows to a height of up to 50 cm (20 in) and often has arching branches. It has narrowly elliptic to oblong leaves 20–90 mm (0.79–3.54 in) long and 2–8 mm (0.079–0.315 in) wide, the lower surface hairy. The flowers are arranged in more or less spherical groups often near ground level. The flowers are dull, deep crimson to dark maroon with a maroon style, the pistil 10–12 mm (0.39–0.47 in) long and the style strongly curved near its end. Flowering mostly occurs from July to December and the fruit is a glabrous follicle about 18 mm (0.71 in) long.

== Taxonomy ==
Grevillea capitellata was first formally described in 1856 by Carl Meissner in de Candolle's Prodromus Systematis Naturalis Regni Vegetabilis from specimens collected by Allan Cunningham near Port Jackson. The specific epithet (capitellata) means "forming a small head".

== Distribution and habitat ==
This grevillea grows in poorly drained places including in swamp margins and occurs in the far south of the Sydney Basin and the northern Illawarra region.

== Conservation status ==
Despite its restricted distribution, Grevillea capitellata has been listed as least concern on the IUCN Red List of Threatened Species. There are no known major threats to this species and its population is presumed to be stable.
