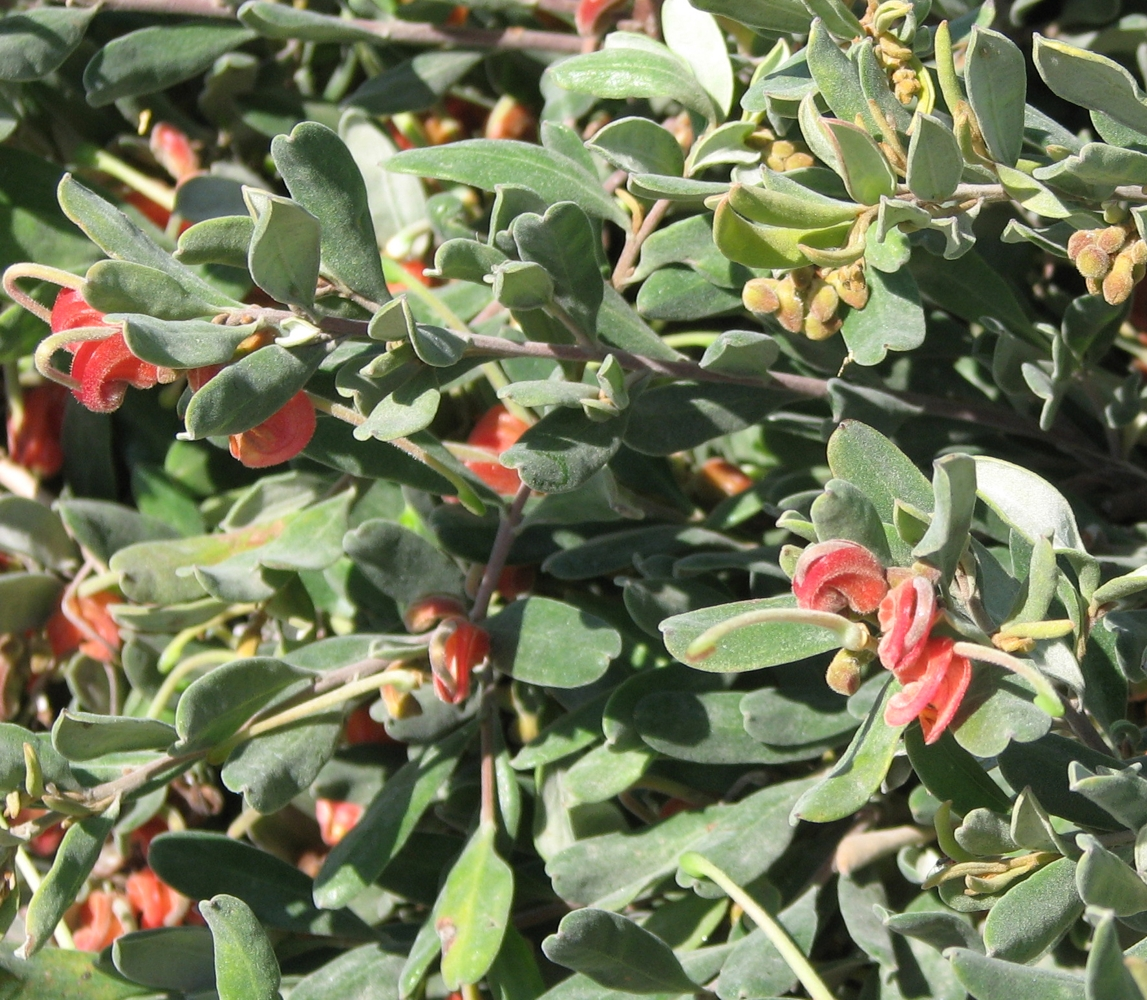
- Subspecies canescens

Conservation status
- Least Concern (IUCN 3.1)

Scientific classification
- Kingdom: Plantae
- Clade: Tracheophytes
- Clade: Angiosperms
- Clade: Eudicots
- Order: Proteales
- Family: Proteaceae
- Genus: Grevillea
- Species: G. arenaria

Binomial name
- Grevillea arenaria R.Br.

Subspecies
- Grevillea arenaria R.Br. subsp. arenaria; Grevillea arenaria subsp. canescens (R.Br.) Olde & Marriott

Synonyms
- Embothrium arenarium (R.Br.) Dum.Cours.

= Grevillea arenaria =

Species of shrub endemic to New South Wales, Australia

Grevillea arenaria, commonly known as sand grevillea or hoary grevillea, is a species of flowering plant in the family Proteaceae and is endemic to New South Wales. It is a spreading shrub with elliptic to egg-shaped leaves with the narrower end towards the base, and red, pink or orange flowers.

== Description ==
Grevillea arenaria is an erect to spreading shrub that grows to a height of 0.3–4 m (1 ft 0 in – 13 ft 1 in). The leaves are elliptic to egg-shaped with the narrower end towards the base, 15–75 mm (0.59–2.95 in) long and 3–15 mm (0.12–0.59 in) wide with the edges turned down or rolled under. The flowers are arranged in groups of two to six on the ends of short side branches along a rachis 1–10 mm (0.039–0.394 in) long, and are red, pink or orange and hairy. The pistil is 24–32 mm (0.94–1.26 in) long and the ovary is sessile. Flowers are present in most months with a peak in spring.

== Taxonomy ==
Grevillea arenaria was first formally described in 1810 by Robert Brown in Transactions of the Linnean Society of London from specimens collected near Port Jackson.

The names of two subspecies are accepted by the Australian Plant Census:

- Grevillea arenaria R.Br. subsp. arenaria, commonly known as sand grevillea has leaves that are silky- or woolly-hairy on the lower surface and a gynoecium 22–27 mm (0.87–1.06 in) long;
- Grevillea arenaria subsp. canescens (R.Br.) Olde & Marriott commonly known as hoary grevillea has leaves that are velvety on the lower surface and a gynoecium 26–32 mm (1.0–1.3 in) long;

== Distribution and habitat ==
This grevillea grows in open forest, often in rocky places, near creeks or cliffs in south-eastern New South Wales. Subspecies arenaria mostly occurs on the eastern side of the Great Dividing Range and nearby ranges from Richmond to the Deua River and subspecies canescens is mostly found on the drier, western side of the ranges, from Tamworth and Gilgandra to Bathurst and western parts of the Blue Mountains.

== Conservation status ==
Grevillea arenaria is listed as least concern on the IUCN Red List of Threatened Species. It is widely distributed and its population is presumed stable, or in minor decline. There are currently some localised threats to this species, but none that would significantly affect its population.
