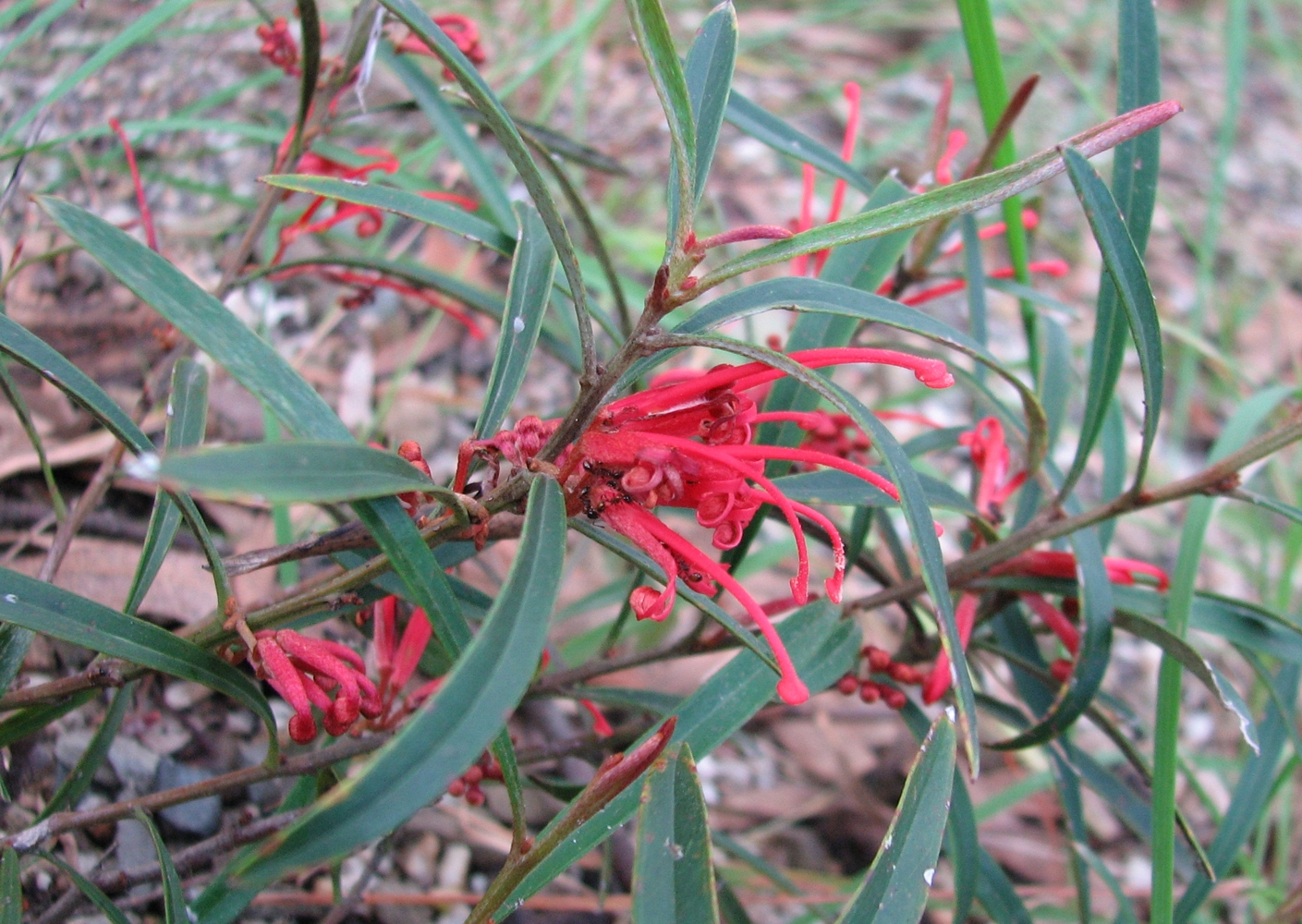
- In Maranoa Gardens

Scientific classification
- Kingdom: Plantae
- Clade: Embryophytes
- Clade: Tracheophytes
- Clade: Spermatophytes
- Clade: Angiosperms
- Clade: Eudicots
- Order: Proteales
- Family: Proteaceae
- Genus: Grevillea
- Species: G. dimorpha

Binomial name
- Grevillea dimorpha F.Muell.

Synonyms
- Grevillea dimorpha var. augustifolia F.Muell.; Grevillea dimorpha F.Muell. var. dimorpha; Grevillea dimorpha var. lanceolata Meisn. nom. illeg.; Grevillea dimorpha var. latifolia F.Muell.; Grevillea dimorpha var. linearis F.Muell. MS; Grevillea dimorpha var. linearis Meisn. MS; Grevillea oleoides subsp. dimorpha (F.Muell.) Benth.; Grevillea speciosa subsp. dimorpha (F.Muell.) McGill.

= Grevillea dimorpha =

Flame grevillea

Species of shrub native to Victoria, Australia

Grevillea dimorpha, commonly known as flame grevillea or olive grevillea, is a species of flowering plant in the family Proteaceae and is endemic to the Grampians National Park in Victoria, Australia. It is an erect to spreading shrub with elliptic to linear or egg-shaped leaves with the narrower end towards the base, and groups of bright red flowers.

== Description ==
Grevillea dimorpha is an erect to spreading shrub that typically grows to a height of 0.4–3 m (1 ft 4 in – 9 ft 10 in). Its leaves are elliptic to linear or egg-shaped with the narrower end towards the base, 50–150 mm (2.0–5.9 in) long and 1.5–20 mm (0.059–0.787 in) wide, the edges turned down or rolled under and the lower surface silky-hairy. The flowers are usually arranged in leaf axils, in down-turned groups of two to sixteen flowers and are bright red, the pistil 21–26 mm (0.83–1.02 in) long. Flowering mainly occurs from August to December and the fruit is an elliptic follicle 12–16 mm (0.47–0.63 in) long, with a bumpy surface.

== Taxonomy ==
Grevillea dimorpha was first formally described in 1855 by Ferdinand von Mueller in Transactions of the Philosophical Society of Victoria from specimens collected in the Grampians. The specific epithet (dimorpha) means "having two forms".

== Distribution and habitat ==
Flame grevillea grows in heathy woodland and forest on sandy soil in the Grampians National Park in Victoria.

== Conservation status ==
The species is listed as endangered under the Flora and Fauna Guarantee Act 1988 and as rare in Victoria, on the Department of Sustainability and Environment's Advisory list of rare or threatened plants in Victoria.
