= W Tree =

- Town
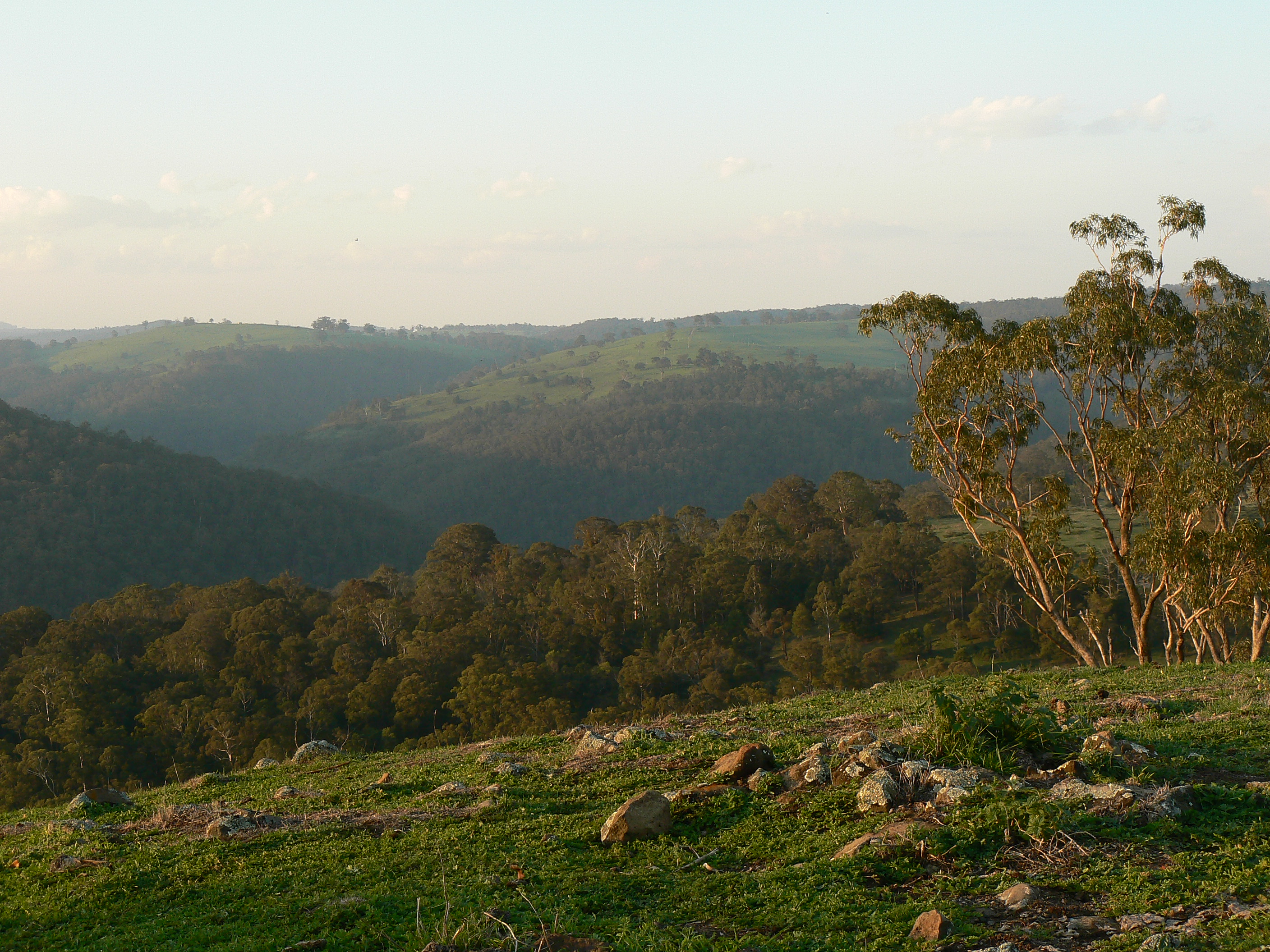
- North-western view from the top of Mount Murrindal

- Coordinates: 37°20′0″S 148°14′0″E
- Country: Australia
- State: Victoria
- LGA: Shire of East Gippsland
- Location: 376 km (234 mi) E of Melbourne; 96 km (60 mi) NE of Bairnsdale; 86 km (53 mi) NW of Orbost; 28 km (17 mi) N of Buchan

Government
  - State electorate: Gippsland East
  - Federal division: Gippsland
- Elevation: 500 m (1,600 ft)

Population
  - Total: 47 (SAL 2021)
- Postcode: 3885
- Annual rainfall: 800 mm (31 in)

W Tree is a locality in Victoria, Australia, located on the Gelantipy Road, in the Shire of East Gippsland's high country near the Snowy River. The valley is located on Gunnai/Kurnai land.

W-Tree is home to an ecovillage, a Tibetan Buddhist centre, and other ecosensitive businesses, among them the headquarters for WWOOF Australia.

== History ==
Both W Tree and nearby Gillingal Post Offices opened around 1902. Gillingal closed in 1938; W Tree was reduced to a telegraph office in 1921 and closed in 1969.

=== Hodge Family ===
Some of the original inhabitants of W Tree were the Hodges, among them Henry Hodge and his second wife Mary, who moved from the Meredith district and settled at Murrundella (now part of Sunrise farm) in the early 1900s. Henry had 3 children with his first wife Elizabeth, and a further 14 children with Mary. Their tenth child was Leomin (Leo) Hodge who was born on 20 May 1904.

Leo was educated at the original W Tree State School (which has since disappeared and only a few rocks that formed the garden beds survive). He went to the school for four years, and left school aged fourteen to work on the family farm.

In 1939 he and his wife Joyce purchased a property at W Tree called The Cottage, which they later renamed Poorinda, an aboriginal name for "light".

Leo farmed Merino sheep and Hereford cattle on his land, as well as working for the Lands Department as a dingo trapper. He had many interests including painting and playing violin, but he is most remembered for breeding and developing the "Poorinda" grevilleas, many of which are still available today. Leo became interested in breeding grevilleas after finding seedlings in his garden. His first trials involved crossing G. juniperina with G. victoriae and G. 'Poorinda Queen' was bred in 1952, followed by many more. He did not have any formal horticultural training and was self-taught, but hosted hundreds of visitors including many noted plant naturalists and botanists. For many years and still today Grevillea Poorinda Royal Mantle is grown, in grand display, on the slopes around Parliament House in Canberra.

"Poorinda" the home no longer exists, it eventually became part of the ONTOS property and burnt to the ground in the late 1990s.

Part of the ONTOS property was sold and is now SIBA, a Tibetan Buddhist Retreat Centre. ONTOS still exists in a smaller form.

== Communities ==
W Tree is home to the following communities:

- Sunrise Farm (ecovillage)
- SIBA Retreat Centre (Tibetan Buddhism)
