= Apudthama National Park =

National park in Queensland, Australia

Coordinates: 11.30°S 142.62°E

- IUCN category II (national park)
- Apudthama National Park

- Location within Queensland
- Location: Queensland
- Nearest city: Weipa
- Area: 2,370 km^{2} (920 sq mi)
- Established: 16 December 1994
- Governing body: Queensland Parks and Wildlife Service
- Website: https://parks.qld.gov.au/parks/apudthama

The Apudthama National Park (formerly Jardine River National Park) is a national park in Queensland, Australia, 2,137 km (1,328 mi) northwest of Brisbane and about 900 km (559 mi) northwest of Cairns, on the tip of Cape York Peninsula.

The park and reserves encompass the traditional country of several Aboriginal groups including people from the Atambaya, Angkamuthi, Yadhaykenu, Gudang and Wuthathi language and social groups. The area is a living cultural landscape, with places and features named in Aboriginal languages, story-places and story-beings, and occupation and ceremony sites throughout. Today the traditional owners retain a strong and continuing interest, through their traditional rights to, and responsibilities for, the land, in the protection and management of the area.

In 2022, land formerly encompassing Jardine River National Park, Heathlands Resources Reserve and Jardine Resources Reserve were re-described as Apudthama National Park and transferred to traditional owners.

== Coastal features ==
Coastal features include:

- The southern half of Orford Bay
- Orford Ness
- False Orford Ness
- Hunter Point

== Vegetation ==
The Apudthama National Park features a complex array of vegetation types, many of which, with the exception of minor occurrences in limited zones close to the south, do not exist elsewhere. The forest types which occur in the National Park can be broken down into nine broad categories:

=== Closed forests ===
- Simple notophyll vine forest - Simple notophyll vine forest with Neofabricia myrtifolia and Melaleuca species
- Araucarian vine forest
- Mesophyll palm forest.

=== Closed scrub ===
Asteromyrtus lysicephala scrub - Ericaceae (Epacridaceae) scrub.

=== Closed heath ===
Grevillea pteridifolia heathland.

=== Closed sedgeland ===
Gahnia sieberiana sedgeland.

=== Open forest ===
- Eucalyptus nesophila forest
- Eucalyptus nesophila / Eucalyptus tetrodonta forest
- Eucalyptus tetrodonta forest.

=== Low open forest ===
Asteromyrtus symphyocarpa / Neofabricia myrtifolia forest.

=== Open heath ===
Nepenthes mirabilis / Asteromyrtus lysicephala heath.

=== Tall shrubland ===
- Melaleuca viridiflora shrubland
- Grevillea glauca shrubland with Eucalyptus species.

=== Low open shrubland ===
Baeckea frutescens / Asteromyrtus lysicephala shrubland.

== Waterfalls ==
The park contains several waterfalls and rock pools, including Twin Falls, where the waters of Elliot River and Canal Creek meet, Fruit Bat Falls, Savo Falls and Elliot (Indian Head) Falls.

== Gallery ==
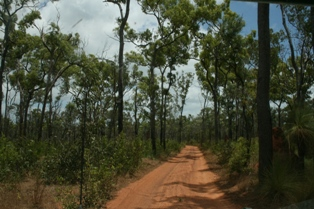
Apudthama National Park

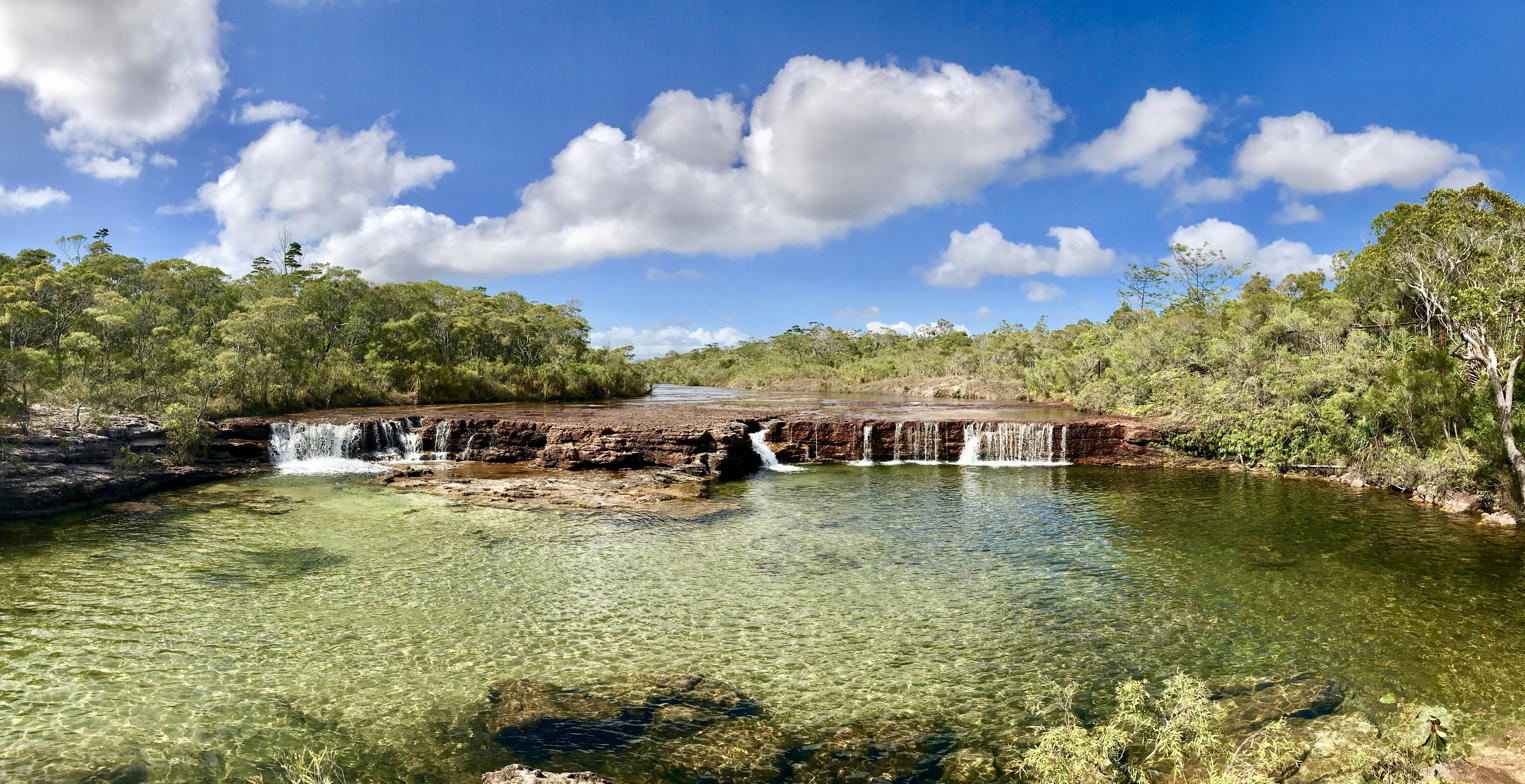
Fruit Bat Falls

== See also ==
- Protected areas of Queensland
