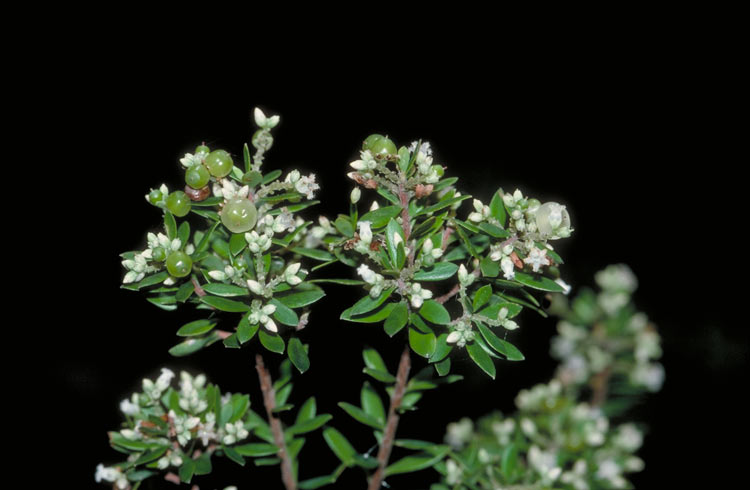

Scientific classification
- Kingdom: Plantae
- Clade: Tracheophytes
- Clade: Angiosperms
- Clade: Eudicots
- Clade: Asterids
- Order: Ericales
- Family: Ericaceae
- Genus: Styphelia
- Species: S. yorkensis

Binomial name
- Styphelia yorkensis (Pedley)
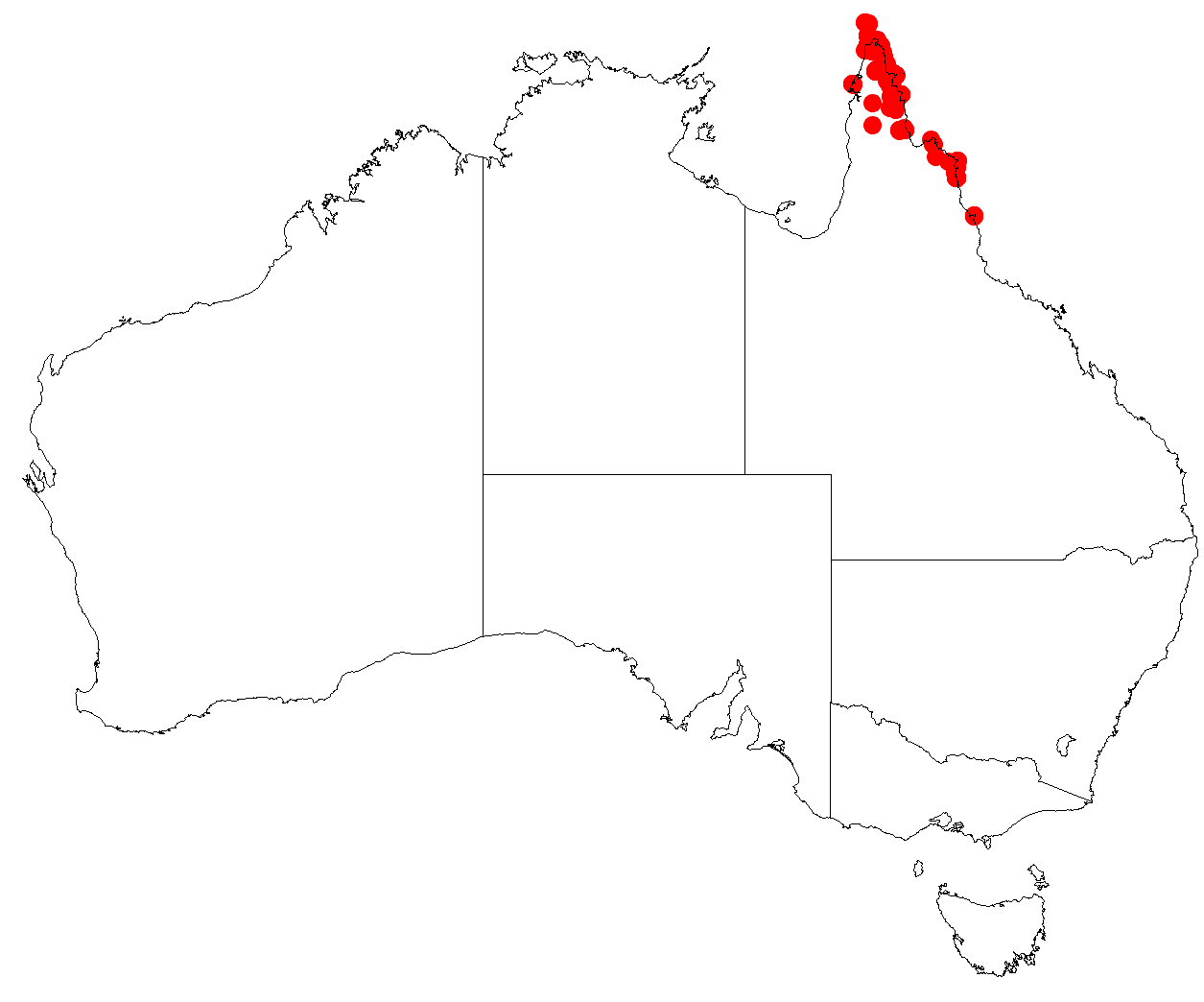
- Occurrence data from AVH

Synonyms
- Leucopogon yorkensis Pedley

= Styphelia yorkensis =

Species of shrub

Styphelia yorkensis is a species of flowering plant in the heath family Ericaceae and is endemic to Cape York Peninsula in far northern Queensland. It is a shrub or tree with brown, fibrous bark, softly-hairy branchlets, lance-shaped or egg-shaped leaves with the narrower end towards the base, and spikes of small, white, tube-shaped flowers.

== Description ==
Styphelia yorkensis is a shrub or tree that typically grows to a height of up to 10 m (33 ft), and has brown, fibrous bark and softly-hairy branchlets. Its leaves are lance-shaped or egg-shaped with the narrower end towards the base, or spatula-shaped, 5–12 mm (0.20–0.47 in) long and 1.5–3 mm (0.059–0.118 in) wide. The flowers are arranged in spikes of three to twelve in upper leaf axils with bracts 0.3–0.5 mm (0.012–0.020 in) long and bracteoles 0.7–0.9 mm (0.028–0.035 in) long. The sepals are egg-shaped, 1.2–1.6 mm (0.047–0.063 in) long and the petals are white, about 2.5 mm (0.098 in) long and joined at the base forming a tube about 0.8 mm (0.031 in) long. The fruit is a white, more or less spherical drupe 3–6 mm (0.12–0.24 in) long.

== Taxonomy ==
This species was first formally described in 1990 by Leslie Pedley who gave it the name Leucopogon yorkensis in the journal Austrobaileya. The specific epithet (yorkensis) refers to the occurrence of this species on Cape York Peninsula. In 2020, Hislop, Crayn and Puente-Lel. transferred L. yorkensis to Styphelia as S. yorkensis in the journal Australian Systematic Botany.

== Distribution and habitat ==
This styphelia grows on sand in the lee of coastal sand dunes in woodland or vine thicket, often with Asteromyrtus symphyocarpa. It occurs on Torres Strait islands and on northern and eastern parts of the Cape York Peninsula as far south as Cooktown.
