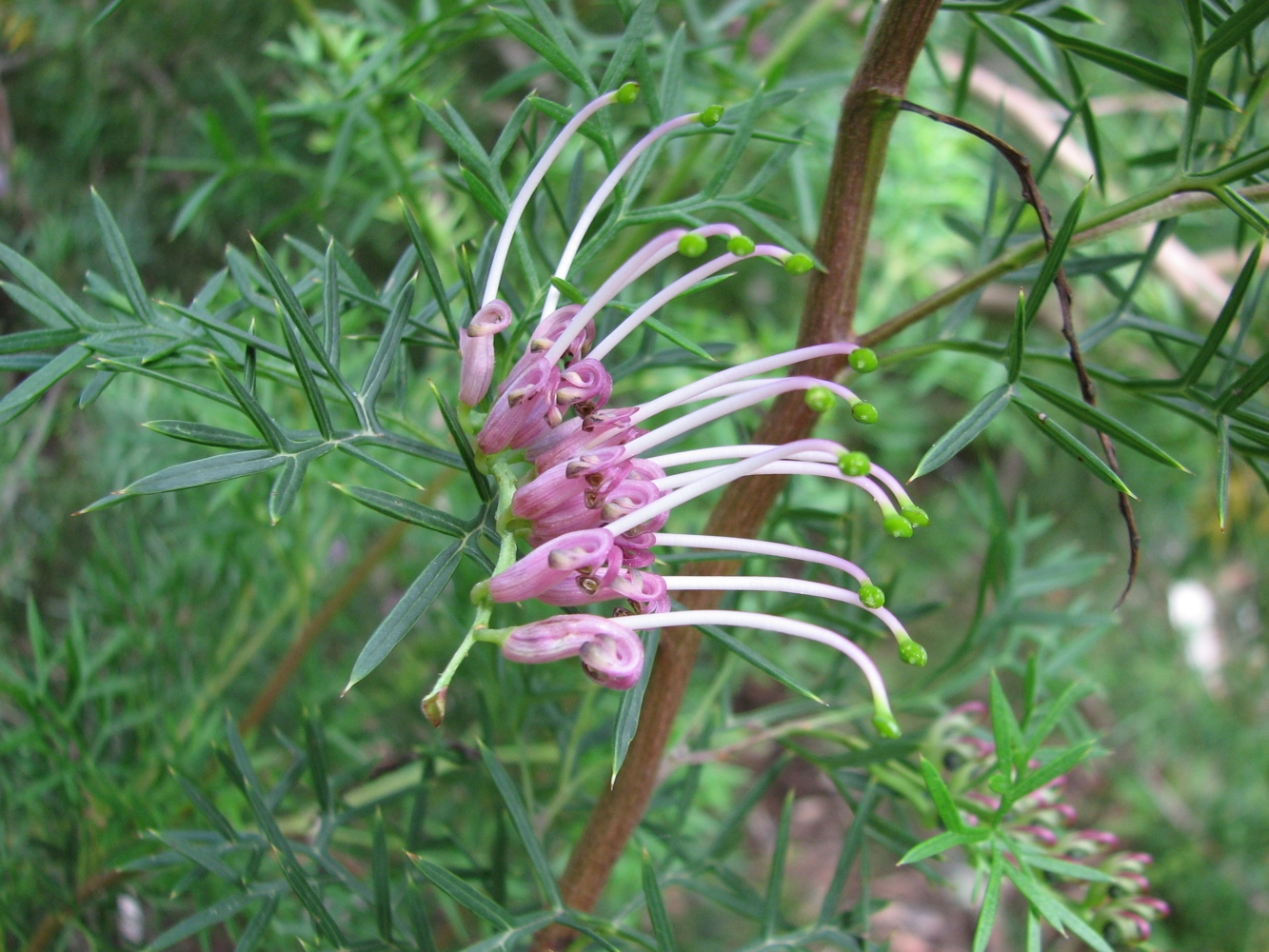
- In the Royal Botanic Gardens Victoria

Conservation status
- Critically endangered (EPBC Act)

Scientific classification
- Kingdom: Plantae
- Clade: Embryophytes
- Clade: Tracheophytes
- Clade: Spermatophytes
- Clade: Angiosperms
- Clade: Eudicots
- Order: Proteales
- Family: Proteaceae
- Genus: Grevillea
- Species: G. rivularis

Binomial name
- Grevillea rivularis L.A.S.Johnson & McGill.

= Grevillea rivularis =

Species of shrub endemic to Australia

Grevillea rivularis, commonly known as Carrington Falls grevillea, is a critically endangered species of flowering plant in the family Proteaceae. It is endemic to a restricted distribution within the Carrington Falls area of New South Wales, Australia and grows on moist, sandy soils in riparian environments. It is a dense, spreading shrub with divided leaves with more or less linear, sharply-pointed lobes, and clusters of purplish-cream to mauve-pink flowers that turn pink and darken as they age.

== Description ==
Grevillea rivularis is a dense, spreading shrub that typically grows to a height of 1–2.5 m (3 ft 3 in – 8 ft 2 in) and 2–3 m (6.6–9.8 ft) wide, though it may reach up to 6 m (20 ft) across. Its branchlets are reddish, angular, mainly glabrous or with a few appressed hairs.

Its leaves are divided, 3–6 cm (1.2–2.4 in) long and wide, with 3 to 9 lobes, each further divided with 3 to 5 linear to narrowly triangular lobes 10–30 mm (0.39–1.18 in) long, 1–2.5 mm (0.039–0.098 in) wide and sharply pointed. The edges of the leaflets are rolled under, almost enclosing the lower surface apart from the midvein. The flowers are arranged in downturned clusters on one side of a rachis 50–60 mm (2.0–2.4 in) long.

It produces 'toothbrush-like' inflorescences with 12-30 individual flowers each, growing on one side along a floral rachis originating from the end of a branchlet. The flowers are glabrous, cream-coloured, later pearly pink or grey, the pistil 27–32 mm (1.1–1.3 in) long. Flowering occurs from September to April and the fruit is shaggy hairy follicle 8–10 mm (0.31–0.39 in) long.

=== Similar species ===
Grevillea rivularis is closely related to Grevillea acanthifolia. It can be distinguished by its glabrous surface on the outer perianth (G. acanthifolia has a villous perianth surface) and its longer pistils (27–32mm long in rivularis, 20–28mm long in acanthifolia.) G. acanthifolia also has a sessile ovary, whereas rivularis has its ovary on a small stalk.

== Taxonomy ==
Grevillea rivularis was first formally described in 1975 by Lawrie Johnson and Donald McGillivray in the journal Telopea from specimens collected in 1960 at Carrington Falls by Ernest Francis Constable. The specific epithet (rivularis) derives from the Latin word meaning "belonging to a small river or stream," referring to the species' habitat.

== Distribution and habitat ==
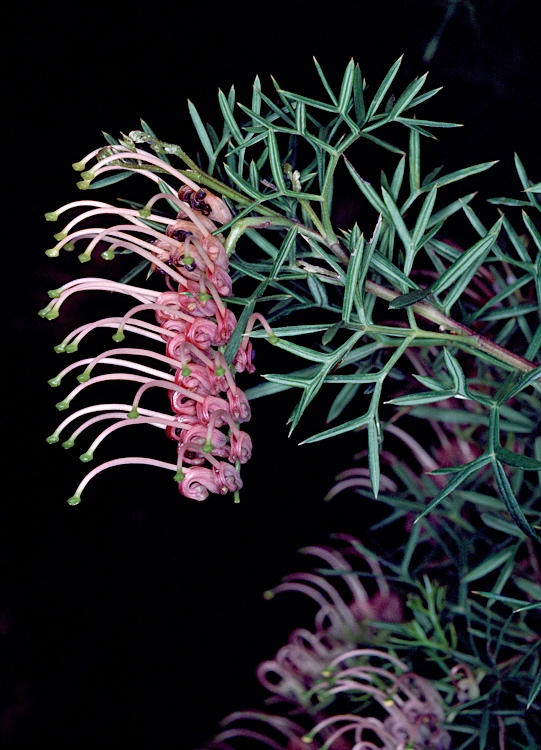
Inflorescence and foliage

Grevillea rivularis is endemic to the Southern Highlands region in New South Wales, Australia. As the common name would suggest, it is restricted to the Carrington Falls area north of Kangaroo River which encompasses Budderoo National Park. The estimated area of occupancy (AOO) and extent of occurrence (EOO) for this species are less than 4 km^{2} (1.5 sq mi).

It primarily grows in moist, riparian areas where it receives 1,000–1,600 mm (39–63 in) annual rainfall. It grows on sandstone soils in open heath among other shrubs or in eucalypt woodland. Once believed to be confined only to the waters edge, a population of 11 mature individuals was found over 500 metres (1,600 ft) away from the water. This may represent a rare establishment event, though it is more likely that it is a remnant of a much more widespread population which has now been reduced to waterside environments by too frequent bushfires.

Associated species include other Proteaceae such as woolly tea tree (Leptospermum lanigerum), small-fruit hakea (Hakea microcarpa), Persoonia and Banksia, trees and shrubs such as coachwood (Ceratopetalum apetalum), black wattle (Callicoma serratifolia), scented paperbark (Melaleuca squarrosa) and common heath (Epacris impressa), Gleichenia ferns and numerous species of rushes and sedges.

== Ecology ==
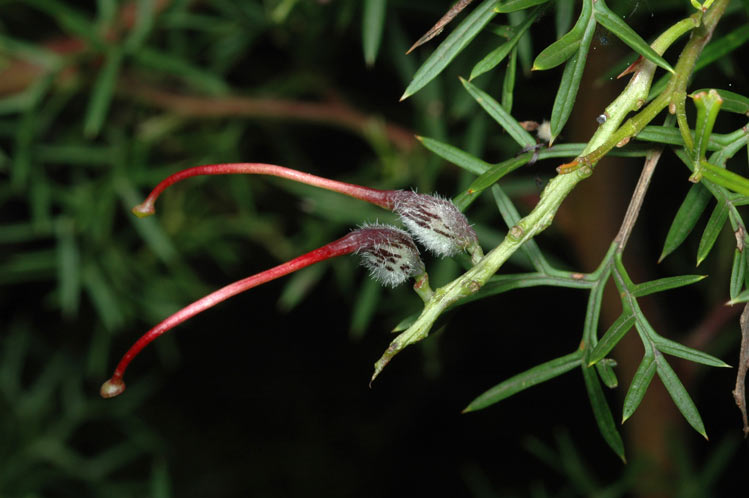
Immature follicles

Since this species grows in heath and bushland along watercourses, it is subject to disturbances from wildfires and flooding. Adult and juvenile plants are killed by fire, thus the species relies entirely on the soil-stored seed bank for regeneration. Its seeds have dormancy mechanisms which allow them to survive in the soil for many years until wildfire, flooding or mechanical disturbances resurface them. Following disturbances, seedlings have been observed to sprout prolifically.

A study conducted in 2003 has shown that Grevillea rivularis has a relatively large soil-stored seed bank under the canopies of mature plants compared to other similar rare grevillea species, with an average of 194 seeds per m^{2} compared to the 4–14 seeds per m^{2} for G. macleayana and 0–6 seeds per m^{2} for G. caleyi. Since seedling mortality is high, few seedlings are recruited into the mature population, so a sufficient seed bank is required to replace the population following a major disturbance.

The seeds of Grevillea rivularis are fairly large and do not have an elaisome so their dispersal method is unknown. It is most likely that the seeds are dispersed simply by falling from the parent plant into the soil below. It is possible that floodwaters may play a part in seed dispersal, given the riparian habitat of the species.

== Conservation status ==
The species is listed as critically endangered under the Australian Government Environment Protection and Biodiversity Conservation Act 1999 and the New South Wales Government Biodiversity Conservation Act 2016. The main threats to the species include its small population size, road and trail management, and inappropriate fire regimes.

== Use in horticulture ==
Since it was first described in 1975, Grevillea rivularis has been widely cultivated on the east cost of Australia, from as far north as Rockhampton in Queensland to as far south as Tasmania, as well as abroad in the United States. It has proven hardy in a wide variety of soil types and environmental conditions, from coastal to inland. It can withstand frosts of as low as 10 °C (50 °F) but is unable to withstand extended dry periods. It grows best in acidic to neutral sandy soils that are well-drained but moist in a partly-shaded position. It is used as a hedge or screen plant, where its flowers are attractive to nectivores and its prickly foliage provides refuge and nesting sites for small birds.

Plants are propagated from seed given peeling or scarification treatment, from new growth cuttings or grafted onto the standard Grevillea robusta rootstock, which has proven compatible in the long term. It has also successfully hybridised with G. diesliana in cultivation.
