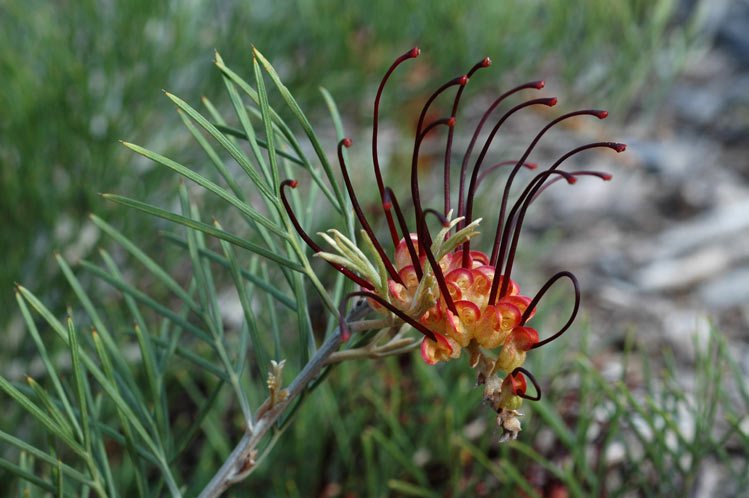
- Grevillea calliantha in Kings Park, Perth

Conservation status
- Critically Endangered (IUCN 3.1)

- Endangered (EPBC Act)

Scientific classification
- Kingdom: Plantae
- Clade: Embryophytes
- Clade: Tracheophytes
- Clade: Spermatophytes
- Clade: Angiosperms
- Clade: Eudicots
- Order: Proteales
- Family: Proteaceae
- Genus: Grevillea
- Species: G. calliantha

Binomial name
- Grevillea calliantha Makinson & Olde

= Grevillea calliantha =

Foote's grevillea

Species of shrub endemic to Western Australia

Grevillea calliantha, commonly known as Foote's grevillea, Cataby grevillea or black magic grevillea, is a species of flowering plant in the family Proteaceae and is endemic to a restricted part of the south-west of Western Australia. It is a spreading, compact shrub with pinnatipartite leaves with linear lobes, and pale yellow to apricot-coloured flowers with a maroon-black to reddish style.

== Description ==
Grevillea calliantha is a spreading, compact, often flat-topped shrub that typically grows to about 1 m (3 ft 3 in) high and 2 to 3 metres (7 to 10 ft) wide. Its leaves are pinnatipartite, almost pinnatisect, 40–75 mm (1.6–3.0 in) long with mostly three to seven linear lobes 10–45 mm (0.39–1.77 in) and 1.0–1.5 mm (0.039–0.059 in) wide with the edges rolled under. The flowers are arranged in groups on a rachis 50–70 mm (2.0–2.8 in) long, and are pale yellow to apricot-coloured and woolly-hairy on the outside, the pistil 28.5–40 mm (1.12–1.57 in) long, the style maroon-black to reddish. Flowering occurs from August to November and the fruit is a woolly-hairy follicle 13–18 mm (0.51–0.71 in) long.

== Taxonomy ==
Grevillea calliantha was first formally described in 1991 by Robert Owen Makinson and Peter M. Olde in the journal Telopea from specimens collected near Cataby in 1989. The specific epithet (calliantha) means "beautiful-flowered".

== Distribution and habitat ==
This grevillea grows in heathland in sandy soil and is restricted an area north of Cataby in the Geraldton Sandplains and Swan Coastal Plain biogeographic regions of south-western Western Australia.

== Conservation status ==
Grevillea calliantha has been listed as critically endangered on the IUCN Red List of Threatened Species. It is also listed as endangered under the Australian Government Environment Protection and Biodiversity Conservation Act 1999 and as threatened flora (declared rare flora — extant) by the Department of Biodiversity, Conservation and Attractions. The species is limited in distribution to an estimated area of occupancy (AOO) of 8km² and in 2017, its population was found to consist of only 47 mature individuals. An Interim Recovery Plan has been prepared.
