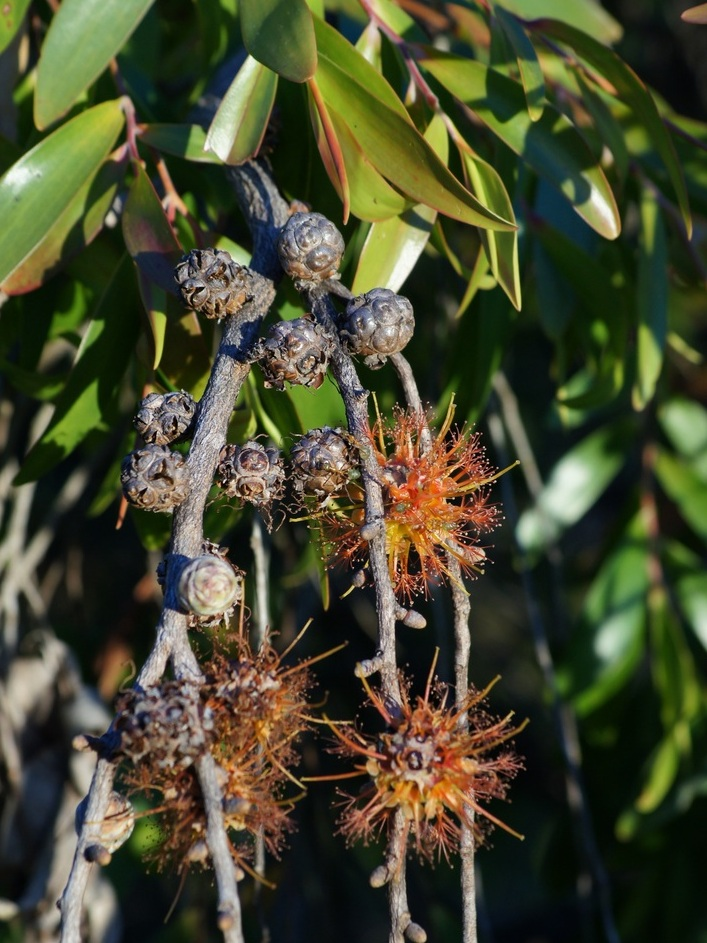
- Asteromyrtus symphyocarpa

Scientific classification
- Kingdom: Plantae
- Clade: Tracheophytes
- Clade: Angiosperms
- Clade: Eudicots
- Clade: Rosids
- Order: Myrtales
- Family: Myrtaceae
- Subfamily: Myrtoideae
- Tribe: Leptospermeae
- Genus: Asteromyrtus; Schauer

Synonyms
- Sinoga S.T.Blake

= Asteromyrtus =

Genus of flowering plants

Asteromyrtus is a genus of flowering plants in the Myrtaceae family. It is closely related to Callistemon and Melaleuca.

== History ==
Asteromyrtus was described as a genus in 1843. The genus was subsequently subsumed into Melaleuca and Sinoga, but was reinstated by Lyndley Craven in 1988 to accommodate seven species, all of which are tropical shrubs or small trees native to New Guinea, Maluku, or northern Australia, in lands peripheral to the Arafura Sea, Gulf of Carpentaria and Torres Strait.

Species

1. Asteromyrtus angustifolia (Gaertn.) Craven - n Queensland
2. Asteromyrtus arnhemica (Byrnes) Craven - n Northern Territory, n Western Australia
3. Asteromyrtus brassii (Byrnes) Craven - s New Guinea, n Queensland
4. Asteromyrtus lysicephala (F.Muell. & F.M.Bailey) Craven - Aru Islands, s New Guinea, n Queensland
5. Asteromyrtus magnifica (Specht) Craven - n Northern Territory, Groote Eylandt
6. Asteromyrtus symphyocarpa (F.Muell.) Craven – Liniment Tree - s New Guinea, n Queensland, n Northern Territory
7. Asteromyrtus tranganensis Craven - Aru Islands
