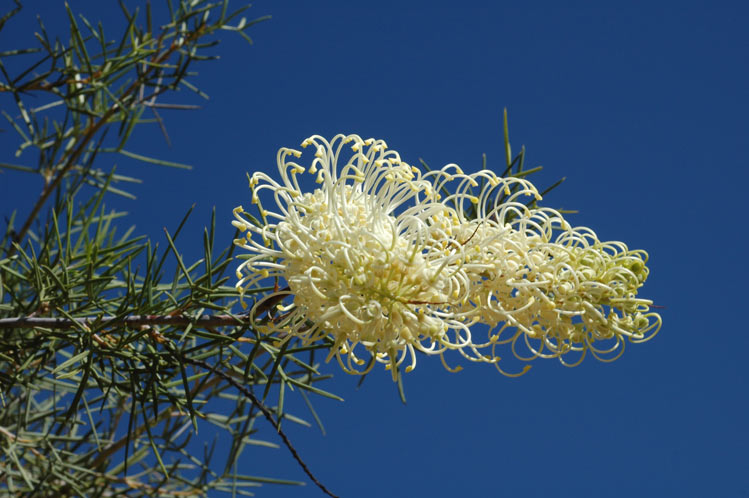
- Grevillea annulifera north-east of Kalbarri

Conservation status
- Least Concern (IUCN 3.1)

Scientific classification
- Kingdom: Plantae
- Clade: Embryophytes
- Clade: Tracheophytes
- Clade: Spermatophytes
- Clade: Angiosperms
- Clade: Eudicots
- Order: Proteales
- Family: Proteaceae
- Genus: Grevillea
- Species: G. annulifera

Binomial name
- Grevillea annulifera F.Muell.

= Grevillea annulifera =

Prickly plume grevillea

Species of shrub endemic to Western Australia

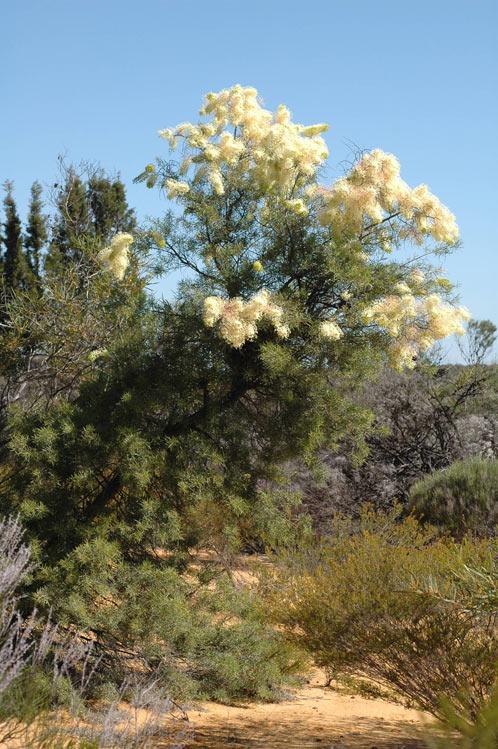
Habit

Grevillea annulifera, also known as prickly plume grevillea, is a species of flowering plant in the family Proteaceae and is endemic to northern Western Australia. It is a spreading to erect shrub with pinnatisect leaves with five to nine sharply-pointed, linear lobes, and cream-coloured to pale yellow flowers.

== Description ==
Grevillea annulifera is a more or less glabrous, spreading to erect shrub that typically grows to a height of 1–4 m (3 ft 3 in – 13 ft 1 in) and has glaucous branchlets. The leaves are pinnatisect with five to nine, more or less spreading linear, sharply-pointed lobes 15–35 mm (0.59–1.38 in) long and 1–2 mm (0.039–0.079 in) wide with the edges rolled under. The flowers are arranged in cylindrical panicles on the ends of branches on a rachis 80–170 mm (3.1–6.7 in) long. The flowers are cream-coloured to pale yellow, the pistil 28–35 mm (1.1–1.4 in) long. Flowering occurs from June to October and the fruit is a more or less spherical follicle 27–29 mm (1.06–1.14 in) long.

== Taxonomy ==
Grevillea annulifera was first formally described in 1864 by botanist Ferdinand von Mueller in his Fragmenta Phytographiae Australiae, based on plant material collected near the Murchison River by Augustus Oldfield. The specific epithet (annulifera) means "ring-bearing", referring to the shape of a gland at the base of the style.

== Distribution and habitat ==
Prickly plume grevillea grows in sandy soil in heath and mallee shrubland near the lower reaches of the Murchison River in the Gascoyne region from around Shark Bay in the north down to around Chapman Valley in the south, in the Geraldton Sandplains and Yalgoo biogeographic regions of Western Australia.

== Conservation status ==
This grevillea is listed as least concern on the IUCN Red List of Threatened Species. It is relatively common within its range and its population is likely stable. There are no known threats to this species, either current or in the immediate future.

It is also listed as not threatened by the Government of Western Australia Department of Biodiversity, Conservation and Attractions.
