= Grevillea papuana =

Scientific classification
- Kingdom: Plantae
- Clade: Tracheophytes
- Clade: Angiosperms
- Clade: Eudicots
- Order: Proteales
- Family: Proteaceae
- Genus: Grevillea
- Species: G. papuana

Binomial name
- Grevillea papuana Diels

Species of shrub endemic to New Guinea

Grevillea papuana is a tree species in the family Proteaceae. It is endemic to New Guinea. The species was formally described in 1916 by German botanist Ludwig Diels.
