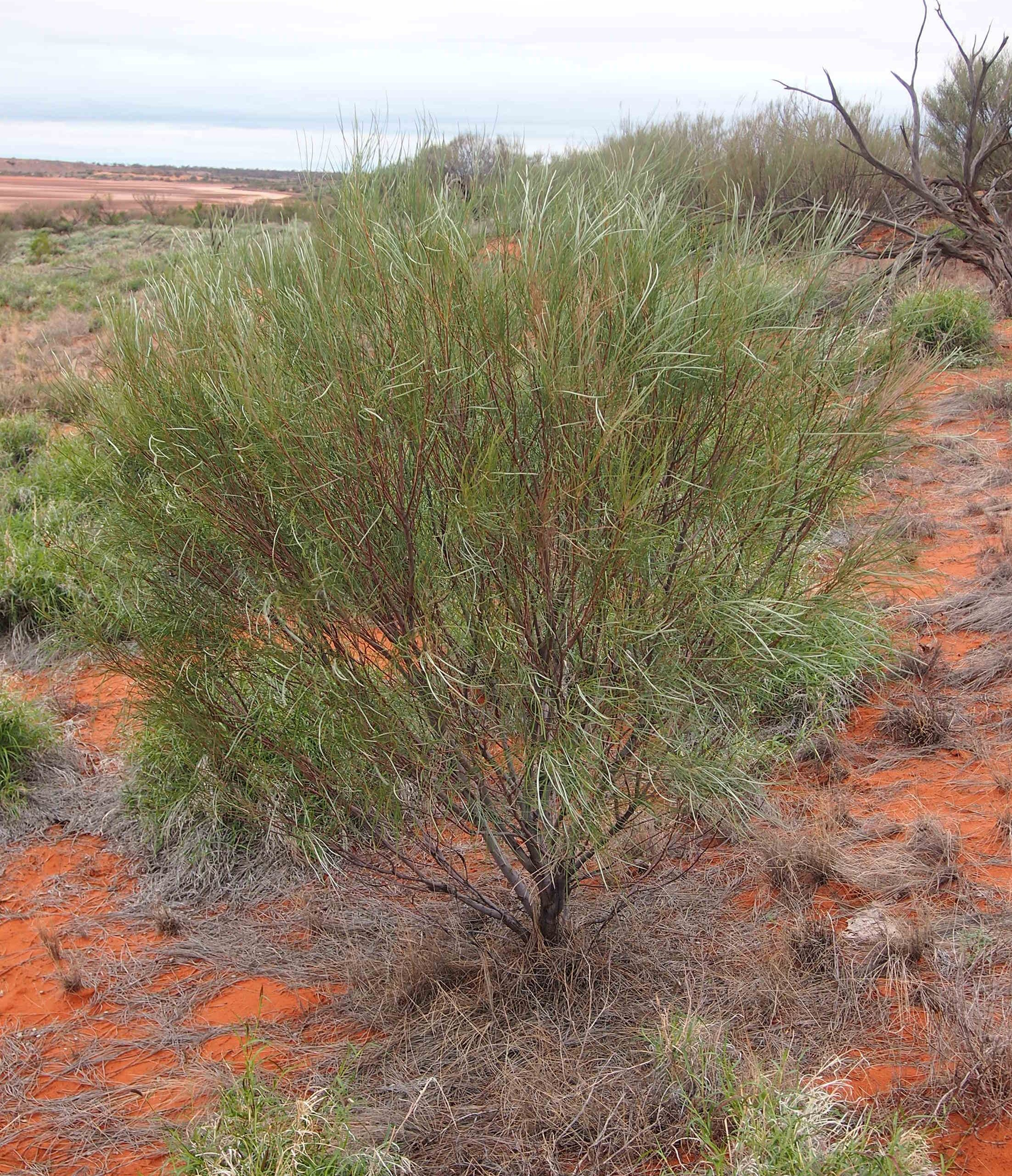

Conservation status
- Least Concern (IUCN 3.1)

Scientific classification
- Kingdom: Plantae
- Clade: Embryophytes
- Clade: Tracheophytes
- Clade: Angiosperms
- Clade: Eudicots
- Order: Proteales
- Family: Proteaceae
- Genus: Grevillea
- Species: G. juncifolia

Binomial name
- Grevillea juncifolia Hook.

= Grevillea juncifolia =

Species of plant endemic to inland Australia

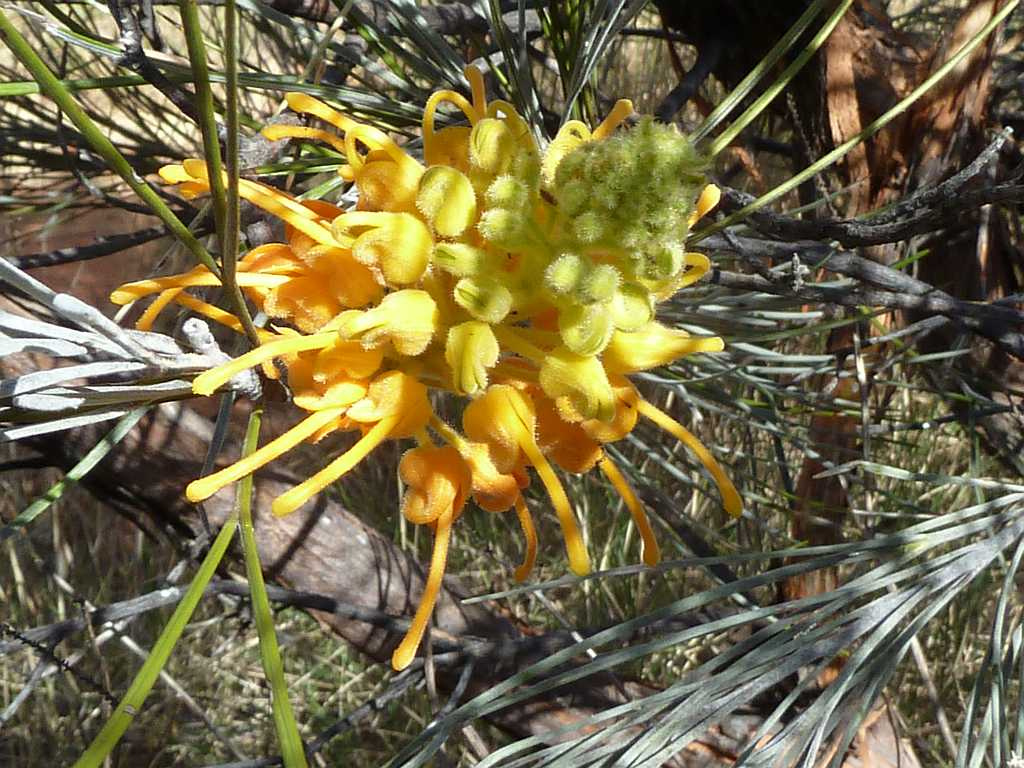
Flowers

Grevillea juncifolia, commonly known as honeysuckle grevillea, honey grevillea, honeysuckle spider flower, and many indigenous names, is a species of flowering plant in the family Proteaceae and is endemic to inland Australia. It is a bushy shrub or small tree with erect, linear leaves and clusters of bright yellow to orange flowers.

== Description ==
Grevillea juncifolia is a bushy shrub or small tree that typically grows to a height of 2–7 m (6 ft 7 in – 23 ft 0 in) high and has woolly-hairy branchlets. Its leaves are linear, 100–300 mm (3.9–11.8 in) long and 1–2 mm (0.039–0.079 in) wide, or divided with more or less parallel lobes 15–220 mm (0.59–8.66 in) long. The edges of the leaves or lobes are rolled under with two parallel woolly-hairy grooves on the lower side. The flowers are arranged in branched clusters of fifteen to fifty on a rachis 50–170 mm (2.0–6.7 in) long and are bright yellow, sometimes orange, the pistil 18–27 mm (0.71–1.06 in) long. Flowering occurs in most months, with a peak from June to November and the fruit is a hairy follicle 15–29 mm (0.59–1.14 in) long.

== Taxonomy and naming ==
Grevillea juncifolia was first formally described in 1848 by English botanist William Jackson Hooker in Thomas Mitchell's Journal of an Expedition into the Interior of Tropical Australia. The specific epithet (juncifolia) means "rush-leaved".

In 2008, Peter M. Olde and Neil R. Marriott described two subspecies of G. juncifolia in The Grevillea Book, and the names are accepted by the Australian Plant Census:

- Grevillea juncifolia Olde & Marriott subsp. juncifolia has leaves that are mostly or all divided with divided leaves;
- Grevillea juncifolia subsp. temulenta Olde & Marriott has undivided, linear leaves.

Indigenous Australians in the Northern Territory give this grevillea many names including tharrkarr (Alyawarre), rrwerleng (Anmatyerre), irrwerlenge (Eastern Arrernte), tharrkarre (Kaytetye), ultukunpa (Pintupi Luritja), ultukunpa (Pitjantjatjara), jiriwuru (Warumungu) and walunarri (Warlpiri).

== Distribution and habitat ==
Honeysuckle grevillea grows in open shrubland or woodland on sandplains, stony hills and open plains, and occurs in inland Australia, in all mainland states and in the Northern Territory, but not in Victoria or Tasmania. Subspecies temulenta is restricted to Western Australia.

== Uses ==
Indigenous Australians use this grevillea for food and medicine.

== Conservation status ==
This species of grevillea is listed as Least Concern on the IUCN Red List of Threatened Species as it has a very wide distribution and is not declining at a sufficient rate to warrant a higher threat category.
