= Asteromyrtus angustifolia =

Conservation status
- Least Concern (IUCN 3.1)

Scientific classification
- Kingdom: Plantae
- Clade: Tracheophytes
- Clade: Angiosperms
- Clade: Eudicots
- Clade: Rosids
- Order: Myrtales
- Family: Myrtaceae
- Genus: Asteromyrtus
- Species: A. angustifolia

Binomial name
- Asteromyrtus angustifolia (Gaertn.) Craven 1988 (1989)

Synonyms
- Melaleuca angustifolia Gaertn. 1788; Asteromyrtus gaertneri Schauer 1843; Myrtoleucodendron angustifolium (Gaertn.) Kuntze 1891

Species of tree

Asteromyrtus angustifolia is a species of plant in the myrtle family Myrtaceae that is endemic to north-eastern Queensland, Australia.

== Description ==
The species grows as a shrub or small tree up to about 6 m in height, with a diameter rarely more than 30 cm. The bark is finely layered. The leaves are about 25–60 mm long by 3–6 mm wide, and very aromatic when crushed. The flowers are cream to pink, with spherical inflorescences, the petals 3–6 mm long. The round fruits are about 10–20 mm in diameter.

== Distribution and habitat ==
The species is found is north-east Queensland, including the Cape York Peninsula. It grows on the sandy soils of dunes and sand hills, in monsoon forest or vine thickets, from near sea level to 150 m elevation.
