= Grevillea elbertii =

Scientific classification
- Kingdom: Plantae
- Clade: Embryophytes
- Clade: Tracheophytes
- Clade: Spermatophytes
- Clade: Angiosperms
- Clade: Eudicots
- Order: Proteales
- Family: Proteaceae
- Genus: Grevillea
- Species: G. elbertii

Binomial name
- Grevillea elbertii Sleumer

Synonyms
- Hakea elbertii (Sleumer) Christenh. & Byng

Species of tree endemic to Indonesia

Grevillea elbertii is a tree species in the family Proteaceae. It is endemic to Sulawesi in Indonesia. It has green flowers which appear in October in the species' native range. The species was first formally described by botanist Hermann Otto Sleumer in Blumea in 1955.
