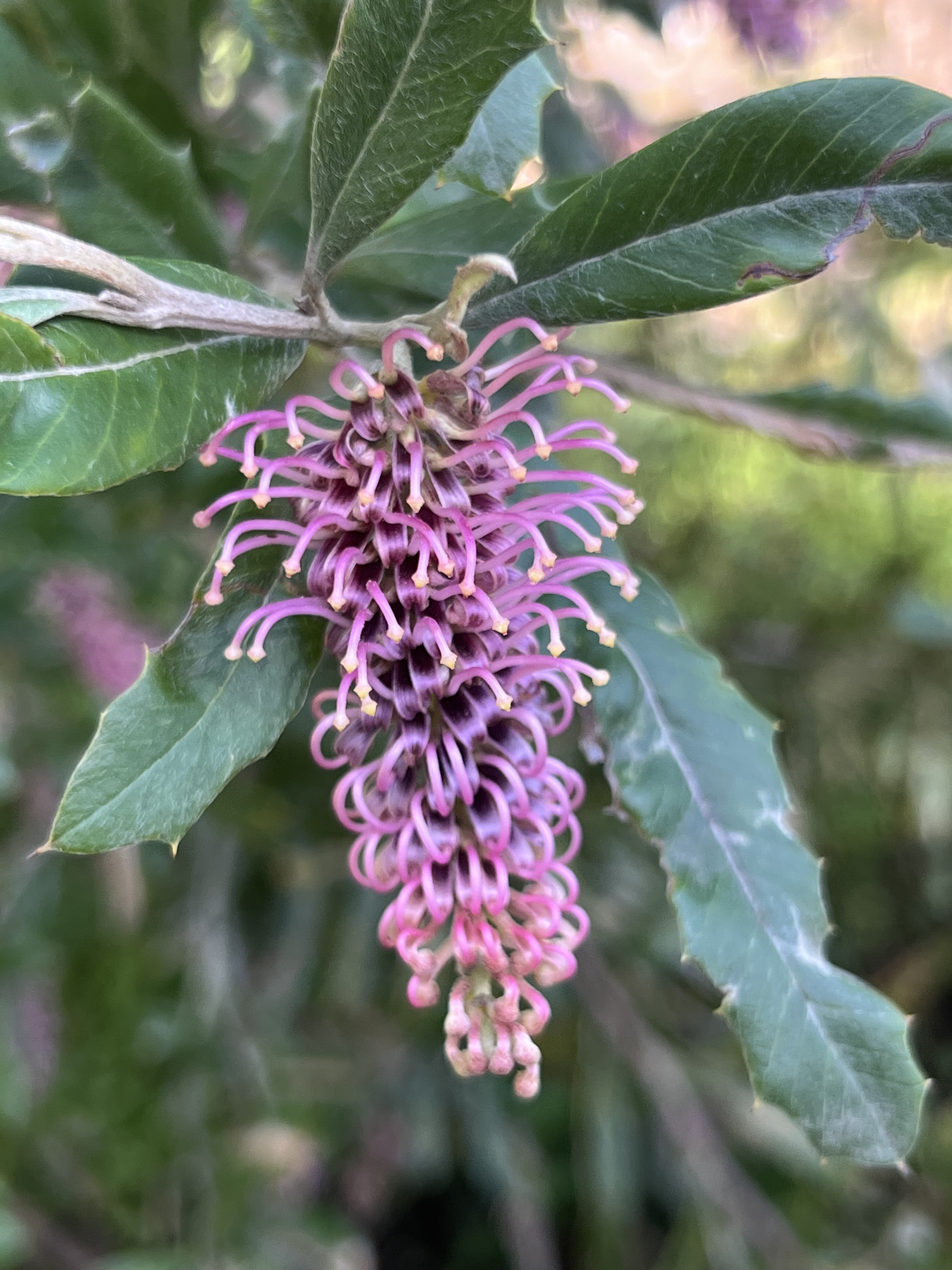

Conservation status
- Critically Endangered (IUCN 3.1)

- Critically endangered (EPBC Act)

Scientific classification
- Kingdom: Plantae
- Clade: Tracheophytes
- Clade: Angiosperms
- Clade: Eudicots
- Order: Proteales
- Family: Proteaceae
- Genus: Grevillea
- Species: G. wilkinsonii

Binomial name
- Grevillea wilkinsonii Makinson

= Grevillea wilkinsonii =

Species of shrub endemic to Australia

Grevillea wilkinsonii, commonly known as Tumut grevillea, is species of flowering plant in the family Proteaceae and is endemic to a restricted part of the south-east of New South Wales. It is an erect, spreading shrub with narrowly oblong to oblong leaves with well-spaced teeth on the edges, and clusters of brownish-pink to purple flowers with a lilac-pink style with a pale yellow tip.

== Description ==
Grevillea wilkinsonii is an ascending to erect, spreading shrub that typically grows to a height of 1–2.5 m (3 ft 3 in – 8 ft 2 in). Its leaves are narrowly oblong to oblong, mostly 50–170 mm (2.0–6.7 in) long and 8.5–23 mm (0.33–0.91 in) wide with 5 to 17 pairs of well-spaced teeth on the edges. The leaves are flat, the lower surface covered with silvery, silky hairs. The flowers are arranged in down-curved clusters on one side of a rachis 20–50 mm (0.79–1.97 in) long, the pistil 14–15 mm (0.55–0.59 in) long. The flowers are brownish-pink to purple with a glabrous, lilac-pink style, the tip of the style pale yellow. Flowering occurs in October and November and the fruit is a silky-hairy follicle 8–9 mm (0.31–0.35 in) long.

== Taxonomy ==
Grevillea wilkinsonii was first formally described in 1993 by Robert Makinson in the journal Telopea from specimens collected near Tumut in 1991. The specific epithet (wilkinsonii) honours "Mr Tom Wilkinson" who discovered the species.

== Distribution and habitat ==
Tumut grevillea is only known from two sites in far south-eastern New South Wales, where it grows in grassy forest near rivers. The larger population occurs near the Goobarragandra River at altitudes between 310 and 340 m (1,020 and 1,120 ft). The smaller population occurs near Gundagai, where it grows on the upper slope of a steep hill.

== Conservation status ==
Grevillea wilkinsonii is listed as Critically Endangered on the IUCN Red List of Threatened Species, under the Australian Government Environment Protection and Biodiversity Conservation Act 1999 and under the New South Wales Government Biodiversity Conservation Act 2016. Threats to the species include grazing by livestock, habitat degradation, weed invasion and climate change increasing the frequency of severe floods.
