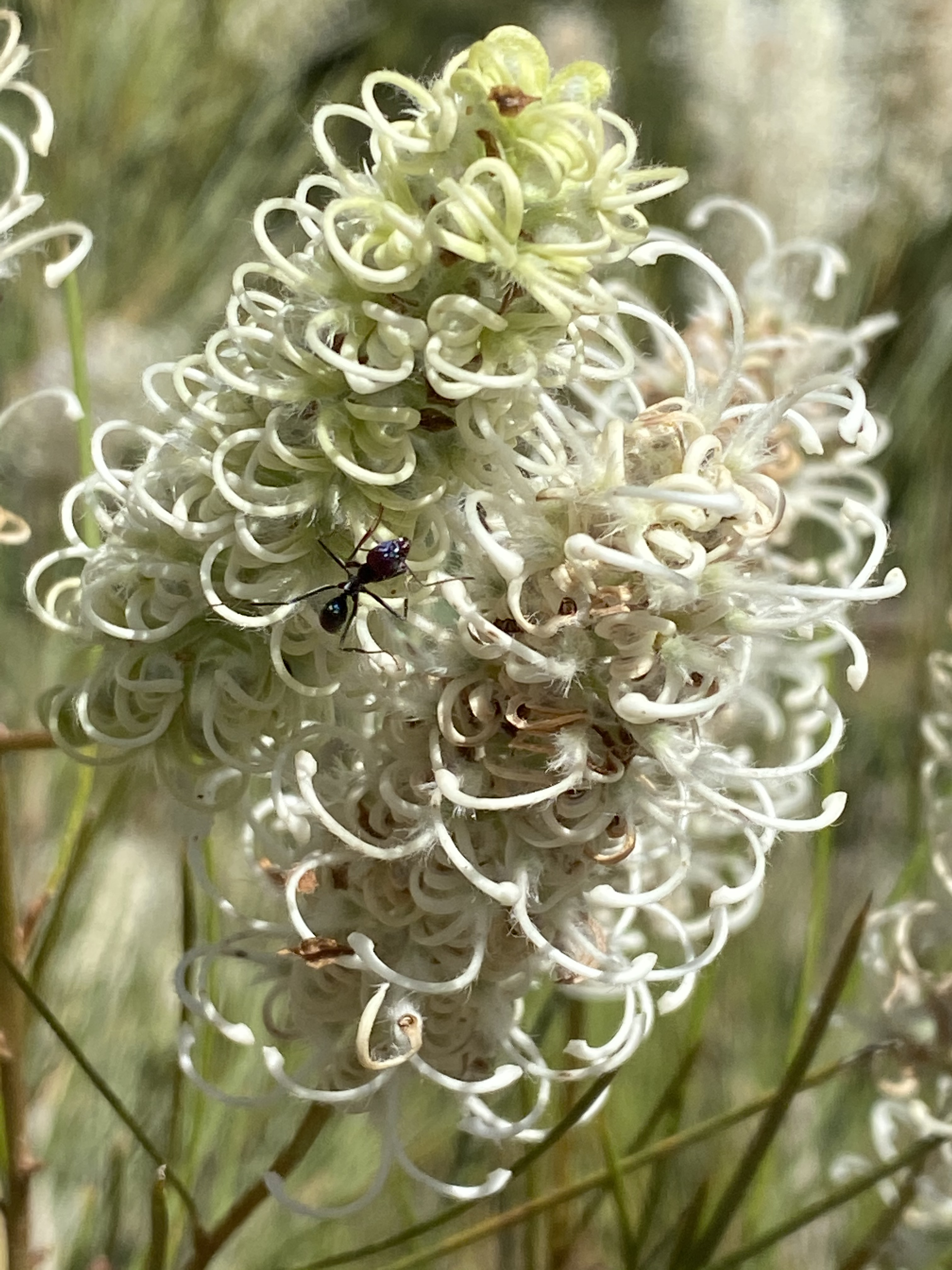

Conservation status
- Critically Endangered (IUCN 3.1)

Scientific classification
- Kingdom: Plantae
- Clade: Embryophytes
- Clade: Tracheophytes
- Clade: Spermatophytes
- Clade: Angiosperms
- Clade: Eudicots
- Order: Proteales
- Family: Proteaceae
- Genus: Grevillea
- Species: G. eriobotrya

Binomial name
- Grevillea eriobotrya F.Muell.

Synonyms
- Grevillea victorii Morrison

= Grevillea eriobotrya =

Woolly cluster grevillea

Species of shrub endemic to Western Australia

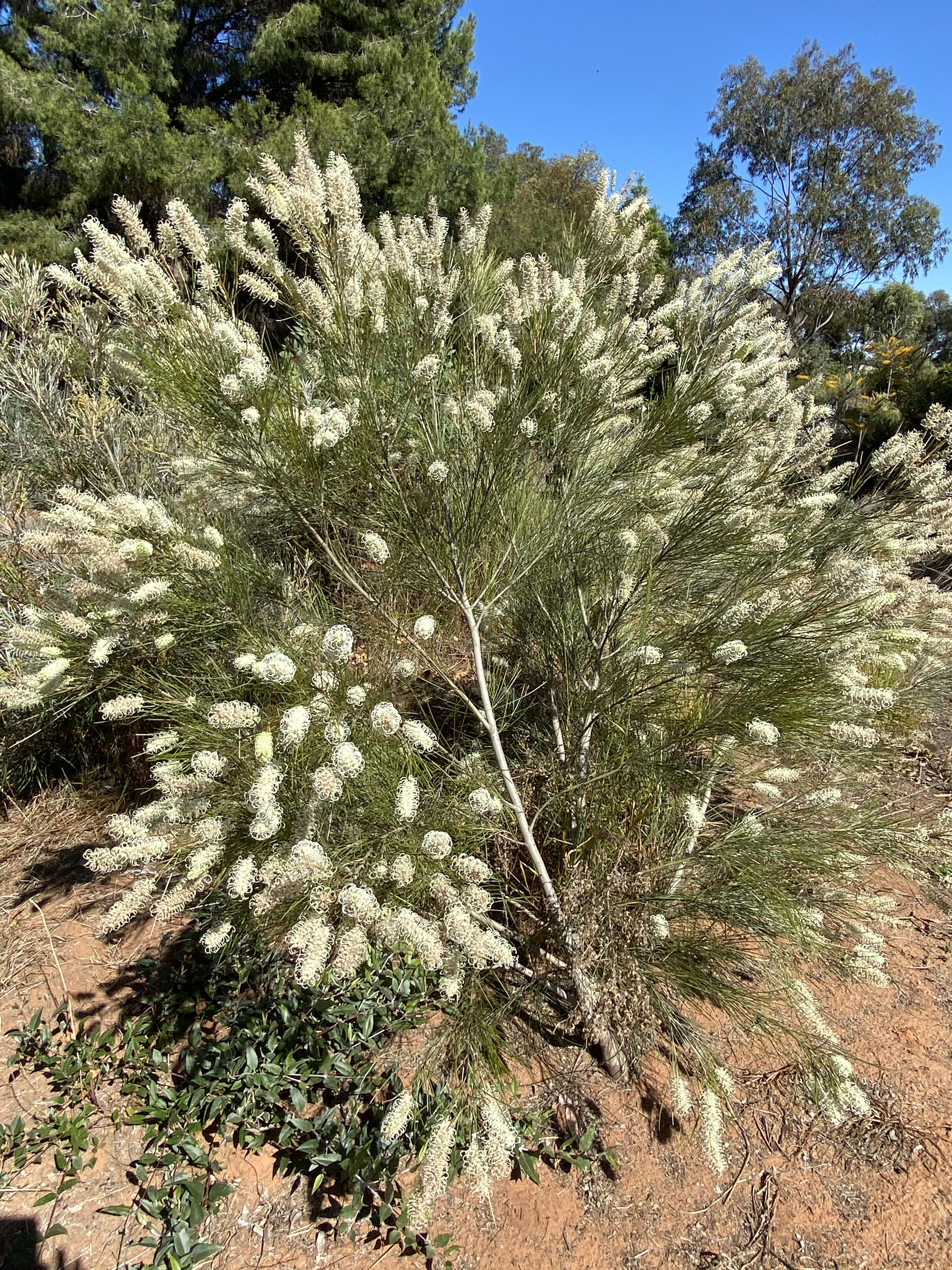
Habit

Grevillea eriobotrya, commonly called the woolly cluster grevillea, is a species of flowering plant in the family Proteaceae and is endemic to a small area in the south-west of Western Australia. It is dense, erect, spreading shrub usually with linear leaves, and groups of white to creamy-white flowers.

== Description ==
Grevillea eriobotrya is a dense, erect, spreading shrub that typically grows to a height of 1.5–4 m (4 ft 11 in – 13 ft 1 in). It usually has linear leaves, sometimes divided with two or three linear lobes, 80–180 mm (3.1–7.1 in) long and 0.9–1.5 mm (0.035–0.059 in) wide. The edges of the leaves are rolled under and the upper surface has three to five longitudinal ridges. The flowers are arranged in dense, cylindrical groups 60–80 mm (2.4–3.1 in) long and are white to creamy-white, the pistil 10–13 mm (0.39–0.51 in) long. Flowering occurs from September to December and the fruit is a lens-shaped to more or less spherical follicle 20–23 mm (0.79–0.91 in) long.

== Taxonomy ==
Grevillea eriobotrya was first formally described in 1876 by Ferdinand von Mueller in Fragmenta Phytographiae Australiae from specimens collected near Mount Churchman by Jess Young. The specific epithet (eriobotrya) means "a woolly raceme".

== Distribution and habitat ==
Woolly cluster grevillea grows on sandplains amongst tall or medium trees in sandy soils in the Avon Wheatbelt, Coolgardie and Yalgoo IBRA regions.

== Conservation status ==
Grevillea eriobotrya has been listed as critically endangered on the IUCN Red List of Threatened Species due to a rapid population decline of at least 80% within the past 60 years caused by habitat clearing and degridation for agriculture. The species is now mainly restricted to roadside verges where it is threatened by weed invasion, fires and clearance of roadside verges.

== See also ==
- List of Grevillea species
