= Asteromyrtus arnhemica =

Conservation status
- Data Deficient (IUCN 3.1)

Scientific classification
- Kingdom: Plantae
- Clade: Tracheophytes
- Clade: Angiosperms
- Clade: Eudicots
- Clade: Rosids
- Order: Myrtales
- Family: Myrtaceae
- Genus: Asteromyrtus
- Species: A. arnhemica

Binomial name
- Asteromyrtus arnhemica (Byrnes) Craven 1988 (1989)

Synonyms
- Melaleuca arnhemica Byrnes 1984

Species of tree

Asteromyrtus arnhemica is a species of plant in the myrtle family Myrtaceae that is native to northern Australia.

== Description ==
The species grows as a shrub or small tree up to about 5 m in height.

== Distribution and habitat ==
The species is found in the extreme north-eastern part of Western Australia in the Victoria Bonaparte bioregion and the north of the Northern Territory. It grows on sandstone substrates along the banks of seasonal creeks, wet tracks and near waterfalls.
