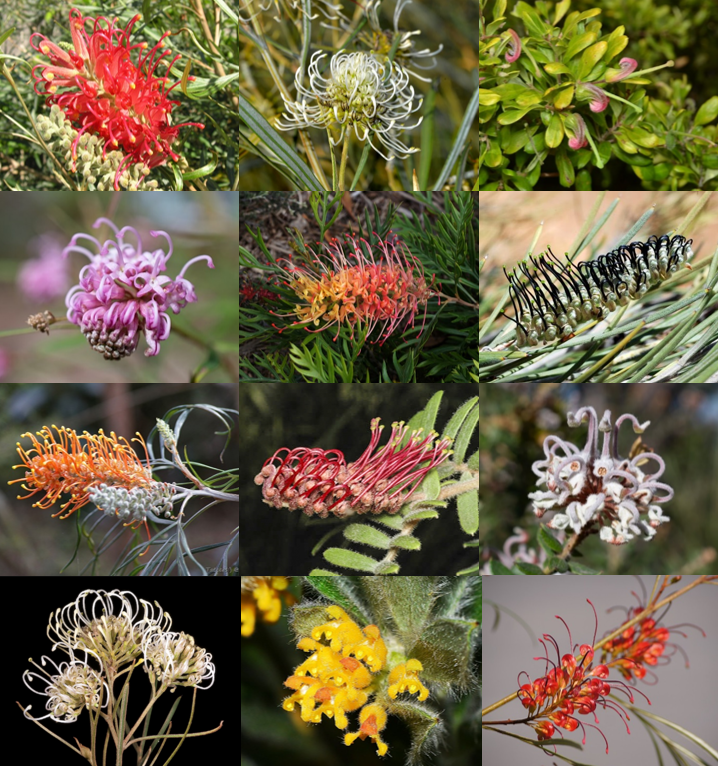
- A variety of flowers from different species and cultivars

Scientific classification
- Kingdom: Plantae
- Clade: Tracheophytes
- Clade: Angiosperms
- Clade: Eudicots
- Order: Proteales
- Family: Proteaceae
- Subfamily: Grevilleoideae
- Tribe: Embothrieae
- Subtribe: Hakeinae
- Genus: Grevillea; R.Br. ex Knight

Species
- See List of Grevillea species

Synonyms
- List: Anadenia R.Br.; Conogyne (R.Br.) Spach; Cycloptera (R.Br.) Spach; Eriostylis (R.Br.) Spach nom. illeg.; Grevillea [infragen.] Manglesia (Endl.) Asch. & Graebn.; Grevillea sect. Conogyne R.Br.; Grevillea sect. Cycloptera R.Br.; Grevillea sect. Eriostylis R.Br.; Grevillea sect. Lissostylis R.Br.; Grevillea sect. Lysanthe (Salisb. ex Knight) Kuntze; Grevillea sect. Lysianthe Kuntze orth. var.; Grevillea sect. Manglesia (Endl.) Meisn.; Grevillea sect. Plagiopoda R.Br.; Grevillea sect. Ptychocarpa R.Br.; Grevillea subg. Manglesia (Endl.) Meisn.; Grevillia Knight orth. var.; Lissostylis (R.Br.) Spach nom. illeg., nom. superfl.; Lysanthe Salisb. ex Knight nom. rej.; Manglesia Endl.; Plagiopoda (R.Br.) Spach; Ptychocarpa (R.Br.) Spach; Stylurus Salisb. ex Knight

= Grevillea =

Genus of flowering plants

Grevillea (/ɡrɪˈvɪliə/), commonly known as spider flowers, is a genus of about 360 species of evergreen flowering plants in the family Proteaceae. Plants in the genus Grevillea are shrubs, rarely trees, with the leaves arranged alternately along the branches, the flowers zygomorphic, arranged in racemes at the ends of branchlets, and the fruit a follicle that splits down one side only, releasing one or two seeds.

== Description ==
Plants in the genus Grevillea are shrubs, rarely small trees with simple or compound leaves arranged alternately along the branchlets. The flowers are zygomorphic and typically arranged in pairs along a sometimes branched raceme at the ends of branchlets. The flowers are bisexual, usually with four tepals in a single whorl. There are four stamens and the gynoecium has a single carpel. The fruit is a thin-walled follicle that splits down only one side, releasing one or two seeds before the next growing season.

== Taxonomy ==
The genus Grevillea was first formally described in 1809 by Joseph Knight from an unpublished manuscript by Robert Brown. Knight gave the spelling Grevillia, corrected by Brown in 1810 to Grevillea in Transactions of the Linnean Society of London. The genus was named in honour of Charles Francis Greville, an 18th-century patron of botany and co-founder of the Royal Horticultural Society.

=== Species ===
There are over 380 species which are endemic to Australia. 15 other species are endemic to areas outside Australia. Ten of these are endemic to New Caledonia, while G. elbertii and G. papuana are endemic to Sulawesi and New Guinea respectively. Two other species, G. baileyana and G. glauca, occur in both New Guinea and Queensland.

== Distribution and habitat ==
Grevilleas grow in most habitats, although few grow in alpine areas, in swamps or saline soils. Most species are endemic to Australia but four species grow in New Guinea, (G. papuana is endemic), ten are endemic to New Caledonia and one species (G. elbertii) is endemic to Sulawesi in Indonesia.

== Ecology ==
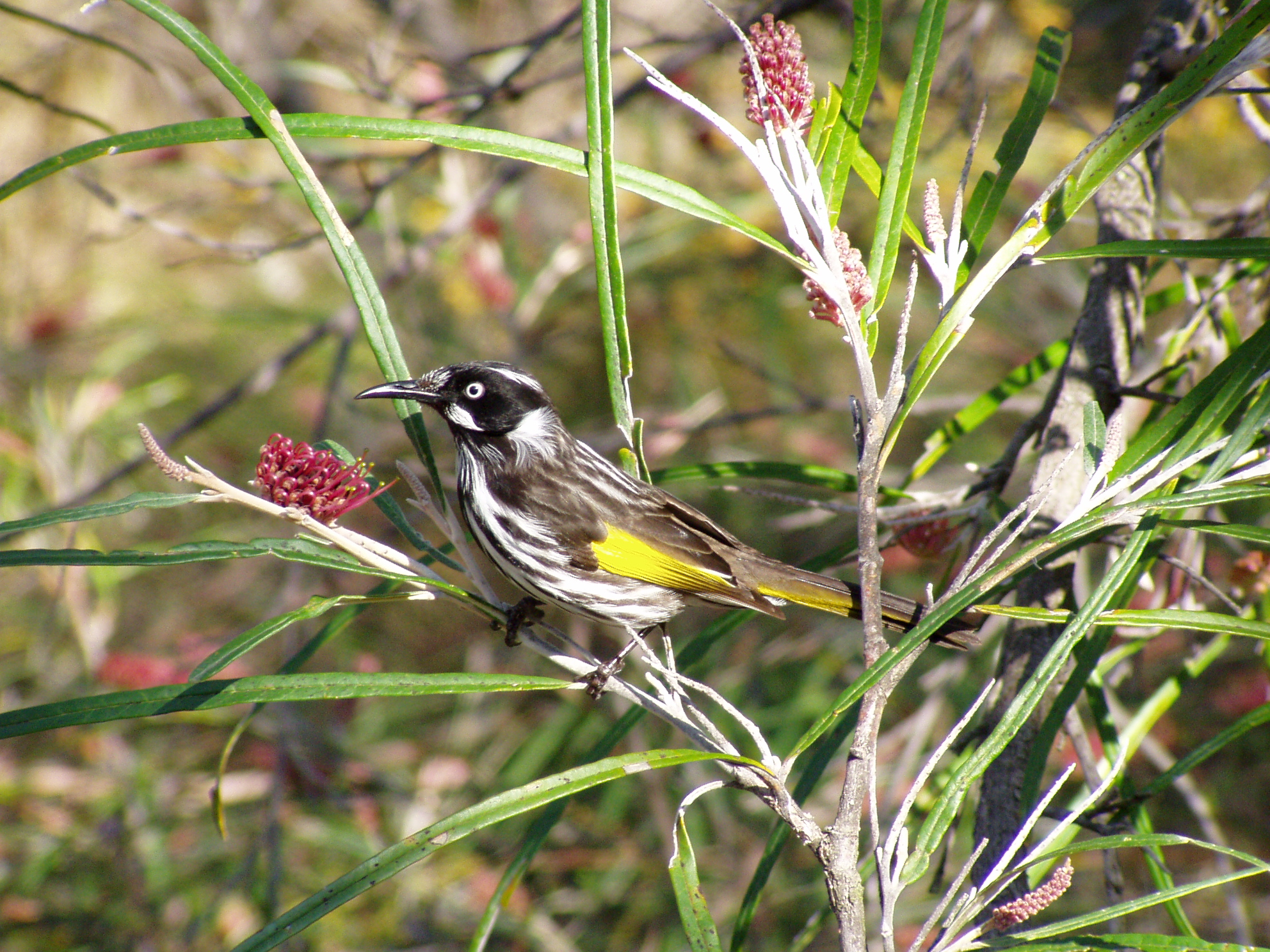
New Holland honeyeater on Grevillea aspleniifolia, Australian National Botanic Gardens, Canberra

=== Pollination ===
Many animals rely on the pollen and nectar from grevilleas as a source of food, in particular, insects and birds. Generally, the insect-pollinated species tend to be white, whereas the bird-pollinated species are varying shades of red, pink and other bright hues.

Birds

Most species of grevillea appear well-adapted to pollination by birds. Many of these species produce brightly-coloured inflorescences and produce large quantities of nectar. The most prominent avian pollinators of grevilleas are the honeyeaters, in which almost all species which coexist with grevilleas have been observed feeding from and pollinating them. Parrots such as lorikeets which have special adaptations for nectivory are also likely pollinators of grevilleas.

Insects

Insects such as beetles, flies and bees are important pollinators of many species of grevillea. The insect-pollinated species tend to have smaller, more fragrant flowers than bird-pollinated species as a way to attract their preferred pollinators, as insects are more drawn to fragrances than birds are. The flowers of these grevilleas are usually white or cream in colour (though may also be brightly coloured) and appear during the summer months to coincide with the population increase of many insects.

Scarab beetles are attracted to the smell of nectar and species such as the white plume grevillea (G. leptobotrys) appear to be mainly pollinated by these and other beetles.

=== As an invasive species ===
Some species of grevillea have become naturalised outside of their native distribution, thus becoming invasive. The most notable of which being G. robusta, also known as silky oak. Native to eastern Queensland and far northern New South Wales, it has been introduced to other parts of Australia and around the world. It has become an environmental weed in other parts of Australia and has been introduced to numerous other countries including New Zealand, French Polynesia, Zimbabwe, South Africa and Hawaii and Florida in the United States, where it is regarded as invasive.

Other species such as G. banksii have also been introduced well outside of their native range as ornamental plants and may be regarded as invasive.

== Conservation ==
As of June 2025, the International Union for Conservation of Nature has 135 species of grevillea in a threatened category (Critically Endangered, Endangered or Vulnerable). Thirty of those species are listed as Critically Endangered, meaning they face an extremely high risk of extinction in the wild. Some of these species include Caley's grevillea (G. caleyi), Woolly cluster grevillea (G. eribotrya), Foote's grevillea (G. calliantha), Tumut grevillea (G. wilkinsonii) and in New Caledonia, Lanterne rouge d’Unia (G. vuniana).

The Australian Government Environment Protection and Biodiversity Conservation Act 1999 lists 45 species and 11 subspecies as being in a threatened category.

The main threats to grevillea species include habitat clearing for roads, mining, housing, agriculture and grazing, altered fire regimes and competition with both invasive and native species.

== Toxicity ==
Some commonly cultivated grevilleas including fuchsia grevillea, (G. bipinnatifida) G. banksii and related cultivars and hybrids contain toxic cyanide. The greatest concentration of cyanoglucosides is found in the flowers, immature leaves, immature seeds and seedlings.

Species including G. banksii and the common cultivar Grevillea 'Robyn Gordon' are responsible for allergic contact dermatitis as they contain pentadecylresorcinol (adipostatin A) and tridecylresorcinol, also known as grevillol. These compounds are chemically similar to urushiol, a compound which causes skin rashes and is found in poison ivy and other members of the Toxicodendron genus.

== Uses ==
=== Use in horticulture ===
Many species of grevilleas are popular garden plants, especially in Australia but also in other temperate and subtropical climates. Many grevilleas have a propensity to interbreed freely, and extensive hybridisation and selection of horticulturally desirable attributes has led to the commercial release of many named cultivars. Among the best known is 'Robyn Gordon', a small shrub up to 1.5 m (5 ft) high and wide which can flower 12 months of the year in subtropical climates. The cultivar 'Canberra Gem' has gained the Royal Horticultural Society's Award of Garden Merit.

They can be grown from soft tip cuttings from December–March (in the Southern Hemisphere) or fresh seed. Many harder-to-grow species can be grafted onto hardy rootstock such as Grevillea robusta.

There is an active Grevillea Study Group in the Australian Native Plants Society for people interested in grevilleas, both for uses in horticulture and for conservation in the wild.

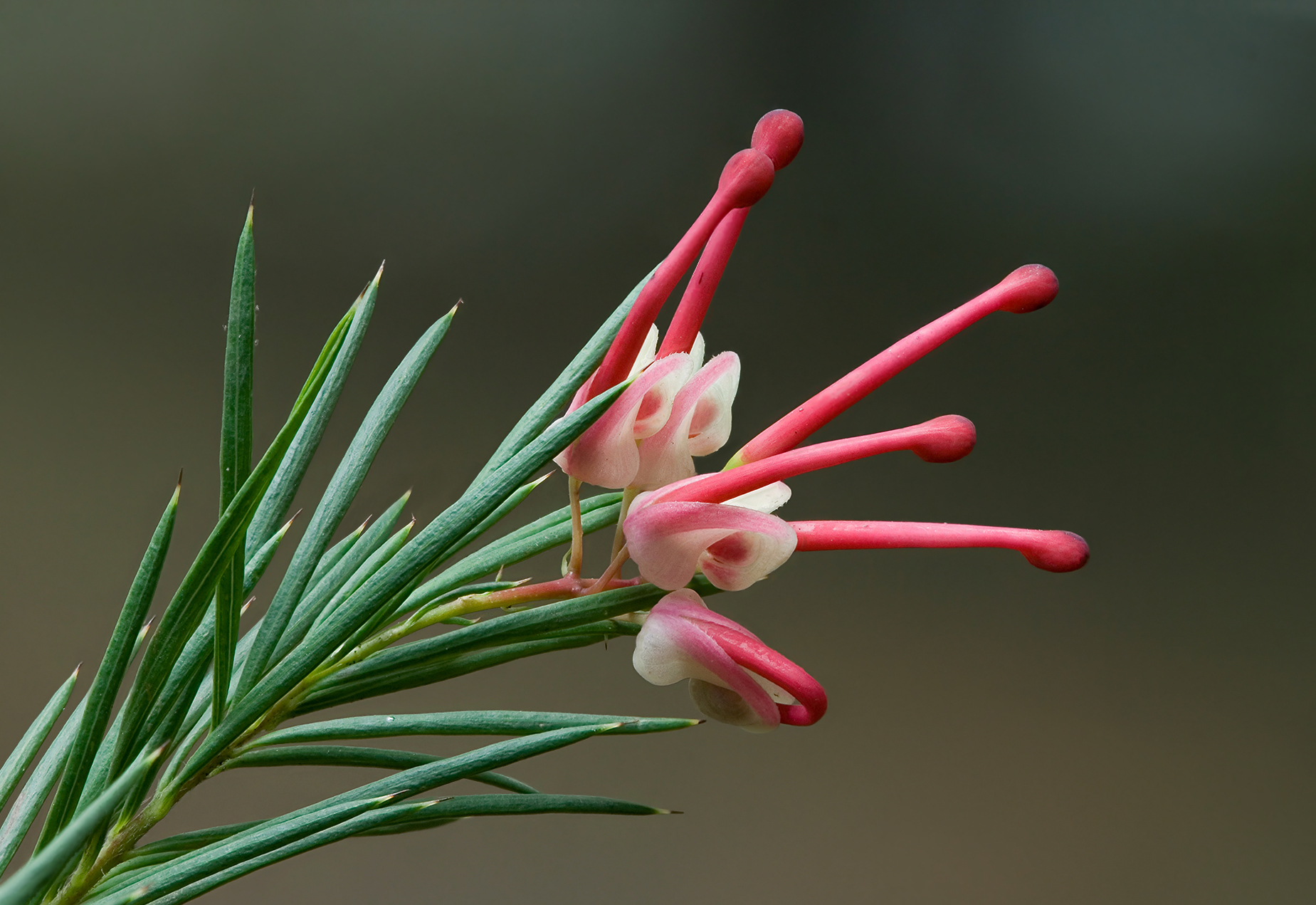
Grevillea rosmarinifolia

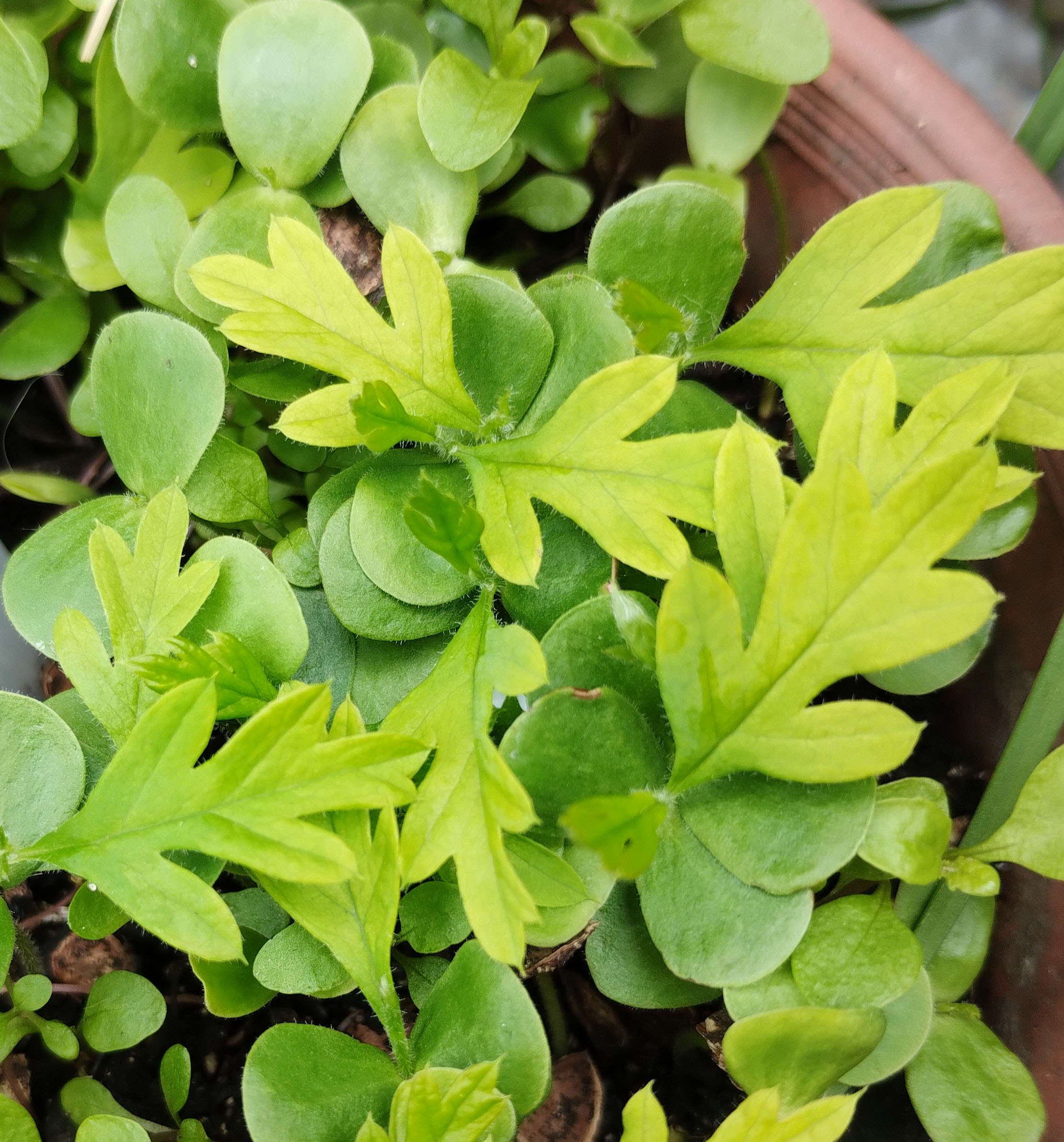
Grevillea robusta, cotyledons and first leaves

=== Traditional Aboriginal use ===
In Australia, many Aboriginal peoples utilise grevilleas for a wide variety of uses, including food, medicine, tools and ceremonial purposes.

Seeds from some species are used as food, such as from the prickly plume grevillea (G. annulifera) of Western Australia and rock grevillea or djamudu (G. heliosperma) by the Bardi people of the Northern Territory.

The most common and widespread use of grevillea as food among Aboriginal Australians is consuming the nectar. Although some grevillea flowers contain toxic compounds, some species such as G. eriostachya, G. juncifolia and G. pteridifolia of northern and western Australia and G. lanigera of south-eastern Australia are used. Flowers are either directly chewed and sucked or entire inflorescences are soaked in water to create a sweet, sugary drink.

=== Colonial furniture ===
A grevillea wood veneer was used on a Pembroke table, a small table with two drawers and folding sides, made in the 1790s for Commissioner of the Royal Navy, Sir Andrew Snape Hamond. The timber from which the veneer was made, referred to as 'beef wood', was sent from Port Jackson by Surgeon-General John White, who arrived in the new penal colony of Australia with the First Fleet. This table is in the collection of the National Museum of Australia in Canberra.

== Gallery ==
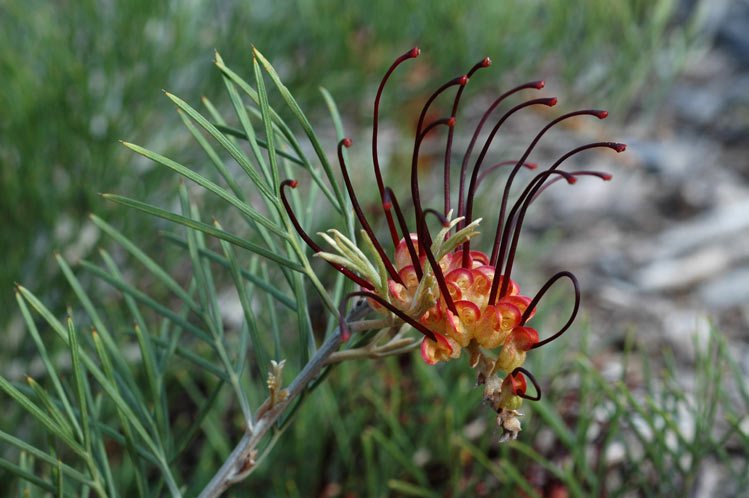
G. calliantha

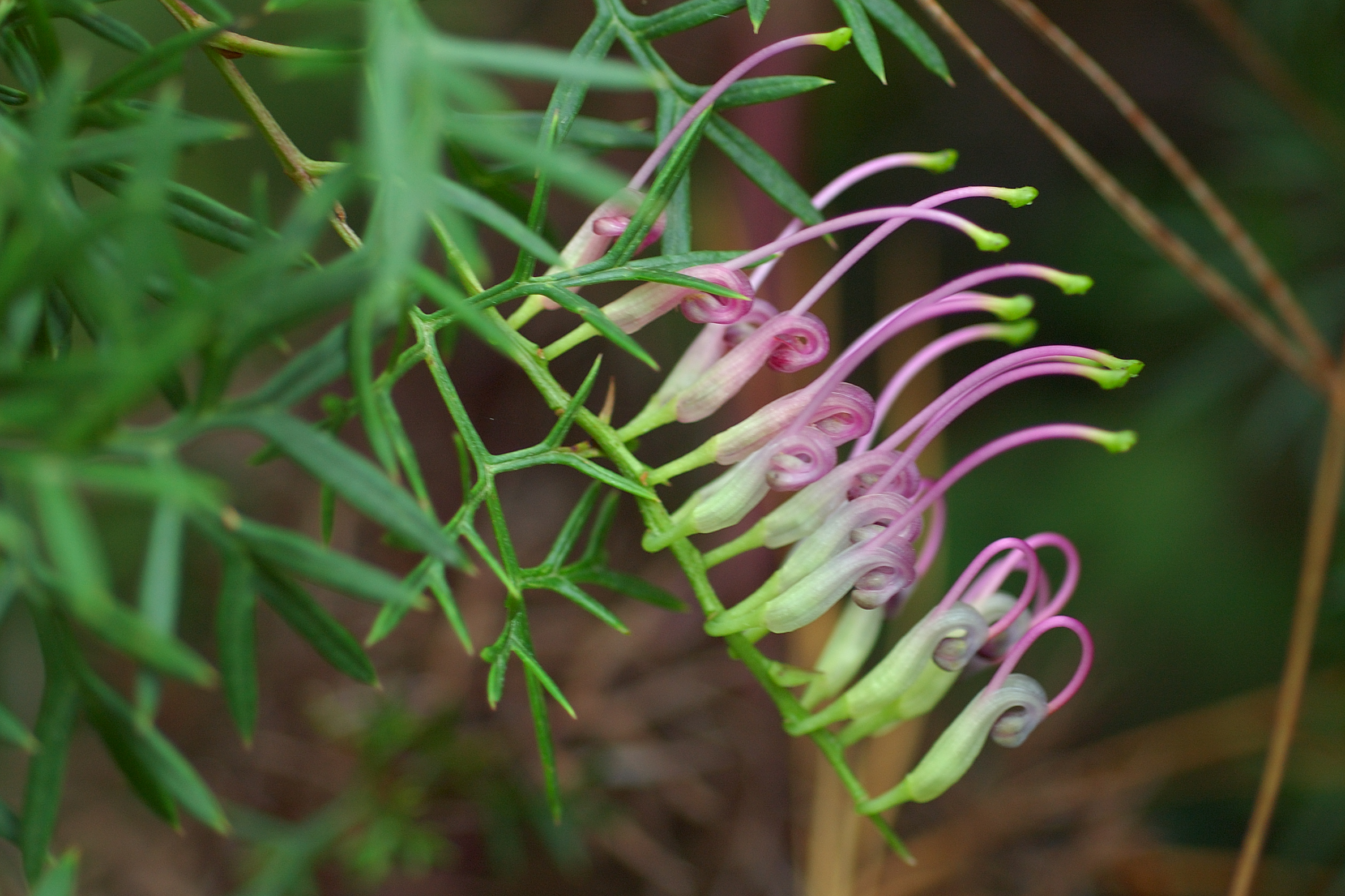
G. rivularis

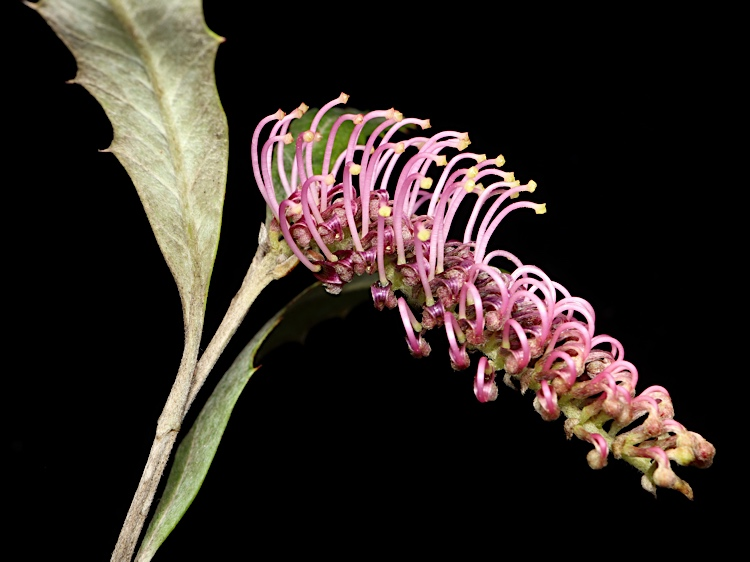
G. wilkinsonii

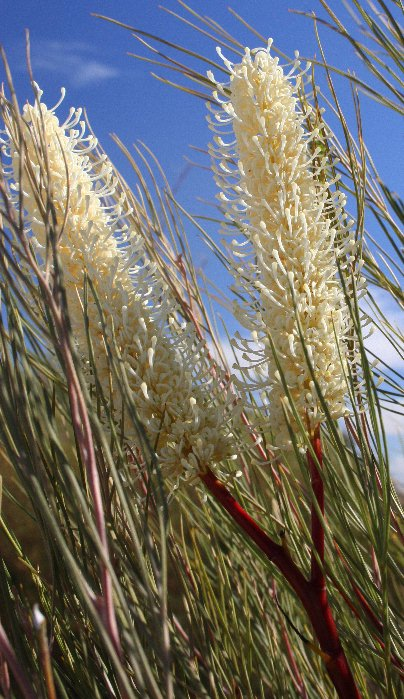
G. candelabroides

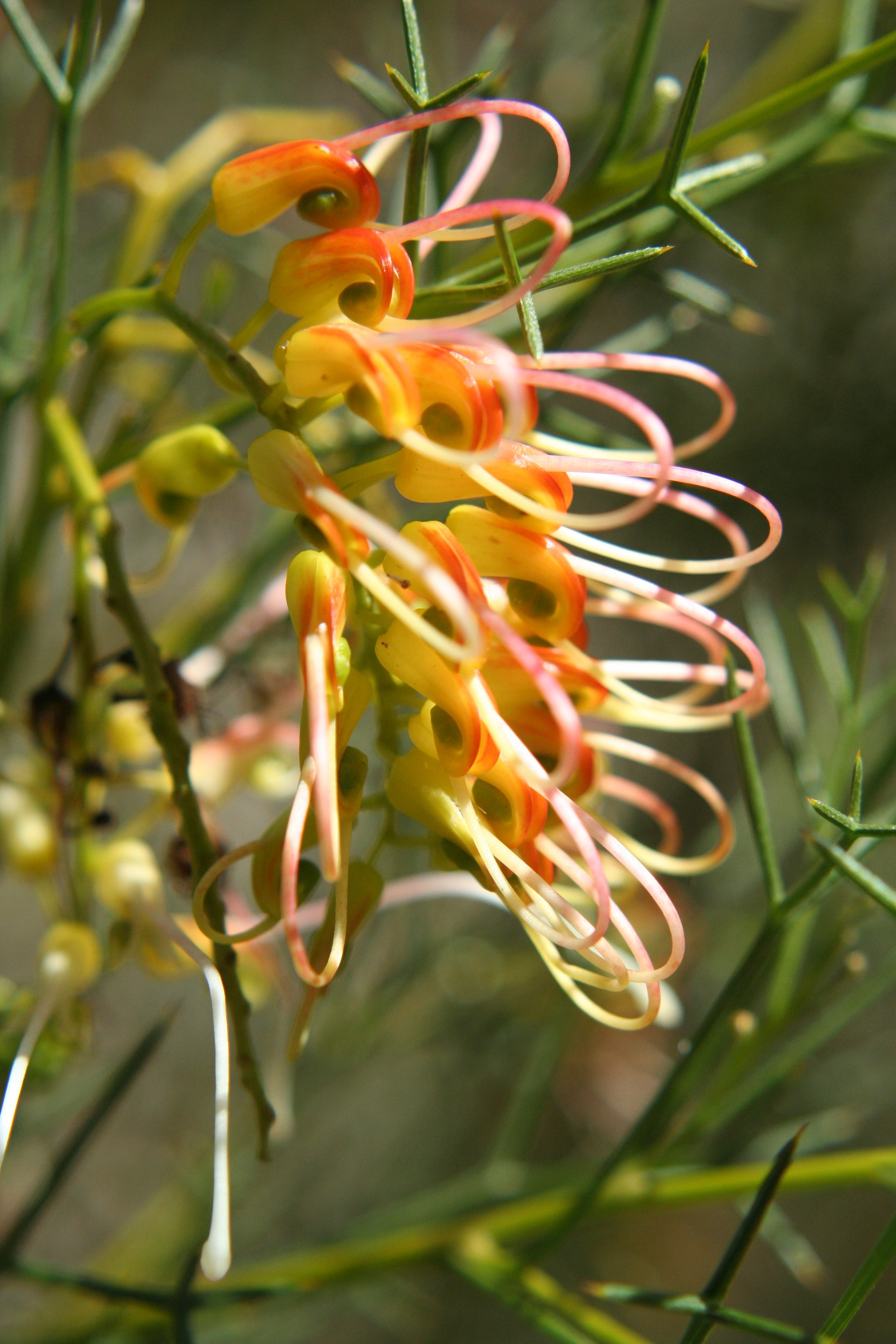
G. dielsiana

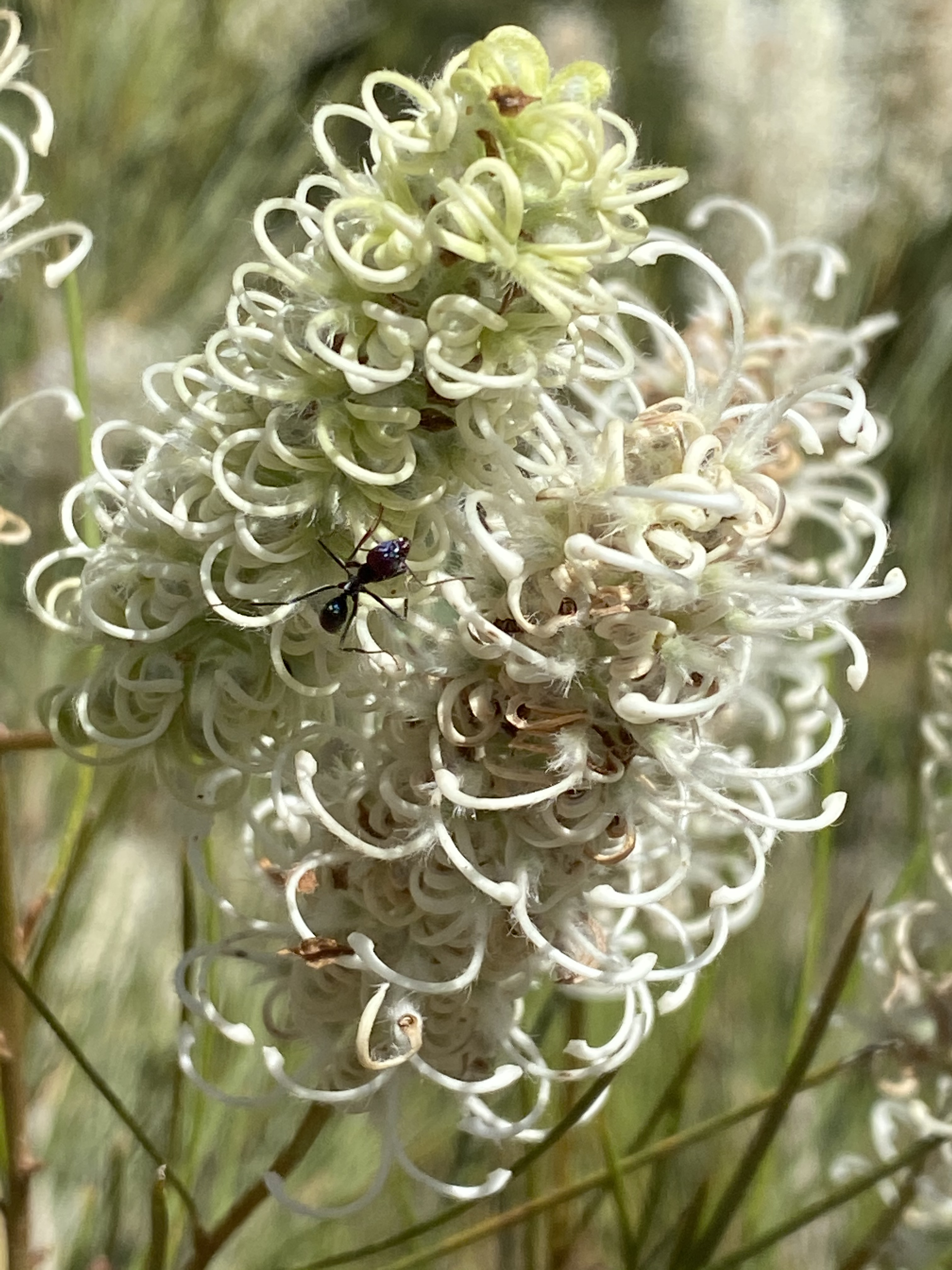
G. eriobotrya

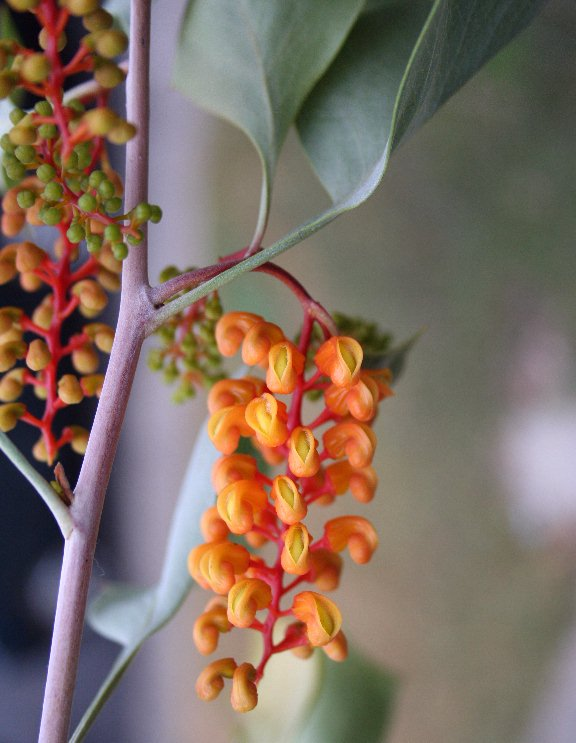
G. wickhamii subsp. aprica
