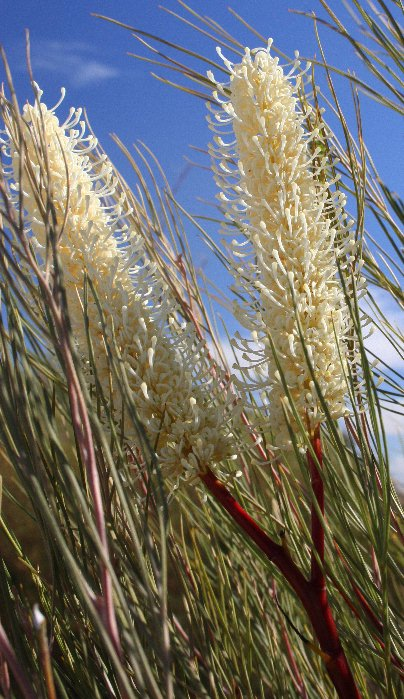

Conservation status
- Least Concern (IUCN 3.1)

Scientific classification
- Kingdom: Plantae
- Clade: Embryophytes
- Clade: Tracheophytes
- Clade: Spermatophytes
- Clade: Angiosperms
- Clade: Eudicots
- Order: Proteales
- Family: Proteaceae
- Genus: Grevillea
- Species: G. candelabroides

Binomial name
- Grevillea candelabroides C.A.Gardner

= Grevillea candelabroides =

Species of plant endemic to Western Australia

Grevillea candelabroides is a species of flowering plant in the family Proteaceae and is endemic to the west of Western Australia. It is a shrub with pinnately-divided leaves with linear lobes, and white or cream-coloured flowers.

== Description ==
Grevillea candelabroides is a shrub that typically grows to a height of 2–4 m (6 ft 7 in – 13 ft 1 in). Its leaves are pinnately divided, 130–260 mm (5.1–10.2 in) long, with seven to fourteen linear lobes 50–190 mm (2.0–7.5 in) long and 0.7–1 mm (0.028–0.039 in) wide with the edges rolled under. The lower surface of the leaves have two hairy grooves. The flowers are arranged on the ends of branchlets in erect groups 100–250 mm (3.9–9.8 in) long, and are cream-coloured to white, the pistil 11–15 mm (0.43–0.59 in) long and glabrous. Flowering mostly occurs from August to January and the fruit is a glabrous, flattened oval follicle 13–15 mm (0.51–0.59 in) long.

== Taxonomy ==
Grevillea candelabroides was first formally described in 1964 by Charles Gardner in the Journal of the Royal Society of Western Australia from specimens he collected near Ajana. The specific epithet (candelabroides) means "candlestick-like", referring to the arrangement of the flowers.

== Distribution and habitat ==
This grevillea grows in heath or shrubland in sandy soil, from north of Kalbarri to near Coorow, in the Avon Wheatbelt, Geraldton Sandplains and Yalgoo biogeographic regions of Western Australia.

== Conservation status ==
The species is listed as not threatened by the Department of Biodiversity, Conservation and Attractions and as least concern on the IUCN Red List of Threatened Species.
