= Asteromyrtus brassii =

Brass's asteromyrtus

Conservation status
- Least Concern (IUCN 3.1)

Scientific classification
- Kingdom: Plantae
- Clade: Tracheophytes
- Clade: Angiosperms
- Clade: Eudicots
- Clade: Rosids
- Order: Myrtales
- Family: Myrtaceae
- Genus: Asteromyrtus
- Species: A. brassii

Binomial name
- Asteromyrtus brassii (Byrnes) Craven 1988 (1989)

Synonyms
- Melaleuca brassii Byrnes 1984

Species of tree

Asteromyrtus brassii, also known as Brass's asteromyrtus, is a species of plant in the myrtle family Myrtaceae that is native to New Guinea and Australia.

== Description ==
The species normally grows as a shrub or small tree up to about 6–9 m in height, though exceptionally up to 25 , with a trunk usually not more than 30 cm in diameter. The bark is layered and flaky, brown to dark grey in colour. The leaf blades are 50–60 mm long by 9–11 mm wide. The inflorescences are globose and sessile, with dark red to deep pink, brushlike flowers. The round fruits are 18–20 mm in diameter.

== Distribution and habitat ==
In Australia, the species' natural range is restricted to the north-eastern Cape York Peninsula of Far North Queensland, no farther south than the McIlwraith Range, though it has been introduced to horticulture elsewhere. In New Guinea it occurs in the Western Province of Papua New Guinea with a range probably extending into Papua. It grows in woodland, open forest or heath, occasionally on rain forest edges, with an elevational range of 30–500 m.
