= Asteromyrtus magnifica =

Scientific classification
- Kingdom: Plantae
- Clade: Tracheophytes
- Clade: Angiosperms
- Clade: Eudicots
- Clade: Rosids
- Order: Myrtales
- Family: Myrtaceae
- Genus: Asteromyrtus
- Species: A. magnifica

Binomial name
- Asteromyrtus magnifica (Specht) Craven 1988 (1989)

Synonyms
- Melaleuca magnifica Specht 1958

Species of tree

Asteromyrtus magnifica is a species of plant in the myrtle family Myrtaceae that is endemic to the Northern Territory of Australia.

== Description ==
The species grows as a slender shrub or small tree up to 3 m in height by 1.5 m across. The bark is brown, rough and fibrous. The flowers occur as cream to yellow globular inflorescences.

== Distribution and habitat ==
The species has a restricted distribution in the Top End of the Northern Territory. It occurs among dissected rocky outcrops and along seasonal creeks on the sandstone plateaus of Arnhem Land as well as on Groote Eylandt and adjacent islands.
