= Asteromyrtus tranganensis =

Scientific classification
- Kingdom: Plantae
- Clade: Tracheophytes
- Clade: Angiosperms
- Clade: Eudicots
- Clade: Rosids
- Order: Myrtales
- Family: Myrtaceae
- Genus: Asteromyrtus
- Species: A. tranganensis

Binomial name
- Asteromyrtus tranganensis Craven 1988 (1989)

Species of tree

Asteromyrtus tranganensis is a species of plant in the myrtle family Myrtaceae that is native to the Aru Islands group of the Maluku archipelago of Indonesia.
