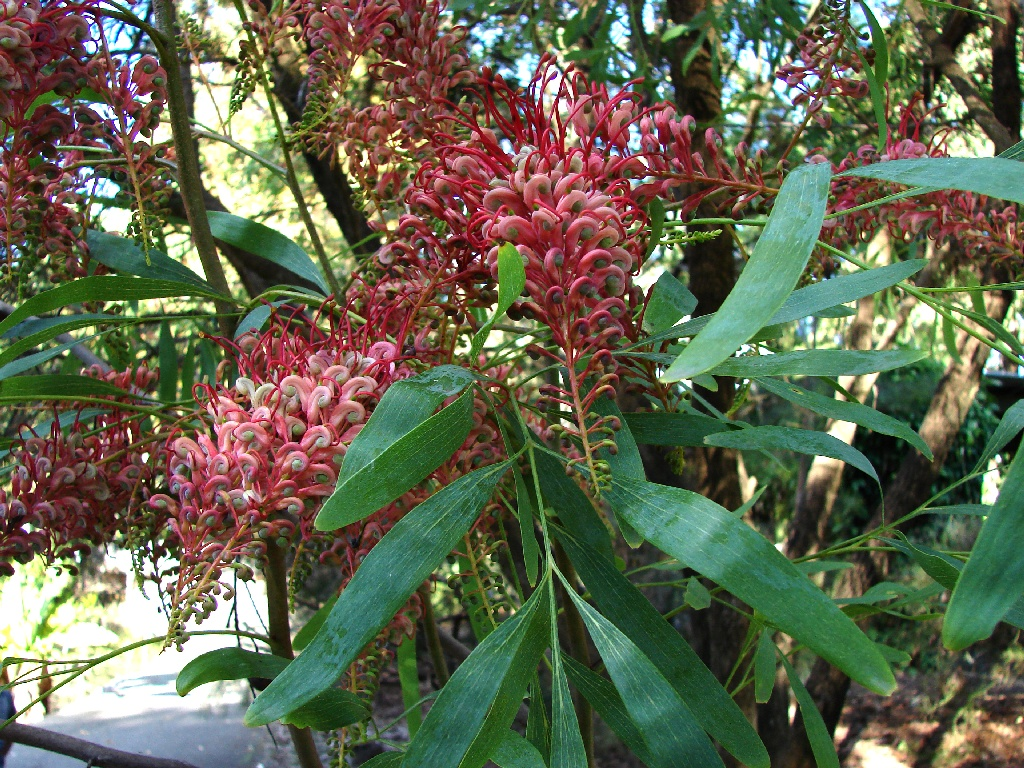
- In Brisbane Botanic Gardens

Conservation status
- Least Concern (IUCN 3.1)

Scientific classification
- Kingdom: Plantae
- Clade: Tracheophytes
- Clade: Angiosperms
- Clade: Eudicots
- Order: Proteales
- Family: Proteaceae
- Genus: Grevillea
- Species: G. heliosperma

Binomial name
- Grevillea heliosperma R.Br.

= Grevillea heliosperma =

Species of shrub endemic to northern Australia

Grevillea heliosperma, commonly known as rock grevillea, is a shrub native to northern Australia, generally growing around 3 to 5 m (9.8 to 16.4 ft) tall, rarely to 8 m (26 ft). It has red flowers.

== Description ==
Grevillea heliosperma grows as a shrub to 3–5 m (9.8–16.4 ft) high, sometimes reaching 8 m (26 ft). The rough bark is grey to black. The deeply lobed leaves are 15–40 cm (5.9–15.7 in) long, with individual lobes or pinnae 5–15 cm (2.0–5.9 in) long by 0.3–1.0 cm (0.12–0.39 in) wide. The compound flower heads, known as inflorescences, appear from May or June to September, and are borne terminally. The flowers are arranged in sometimes-branched racemes, the end rachis 60–160 mm (2.4–6.3 in) long, and are red to deep pink. Each flower is on a pedicel 5–12 mm (0.20–0.47 in) long and the pistil is 34–46.5 mm (1.34–1.83 in) long. Flowers are followed by glabrous, thick-walled, more or less spherical follicles 18.5–35 mm (0.73–1.38 in) long, each containing two seeds.

Grevillea heliosperma resembles G. decurrens, which has pink flowers and is found in more gravelly soils. The two are closely related and have been considered conspecific, and there are populations with some intermediate characteristics.

== Taxonomy and naming ==
Grevillea heliosperma was described in 1810 by Robert Brown in Transactions of the Linnean Society of London from material collected near the northern coastline of Australia. Its species name is derived from helios "sun" and sperma "seed" and relates to the shape of the seed surrounded by a winglike membrane.

A local name from the indigenous people of Groote Eylandt in their Enindilyakwa language is yinumamurarra.

== Distribution and habitat ==
Rock grevillea grows in open forest or woodland, often in rocky habitats and sometimes on the edge of vine forest. It is found in the northern tropics of Australia, in the northern and central Kimberley regions of Western Australia, on the Barkly Tableland and Top End including off-shore islands of the Northern Territory, and the western gulf of north Queensland.

== Uses and cultivation ==
When grown on its own roots, Grevillea heliosperma prefers a slightly acid soil and climate with predominantly summer rainfall.

Grevillea heliosperma has been successfully grafted onto Grevillea robusta. Local indigenous people ate the seeds raw and drank the nectar. Crushed leaves and bark could be made into a mixture to wash sores with.

== Conservation status ==
Grevillea heliosperma is listed as least concern on the IUCN Red List of Threatened Species. It is very common and widespread and does not face any major threats, either currently or in the near future.
