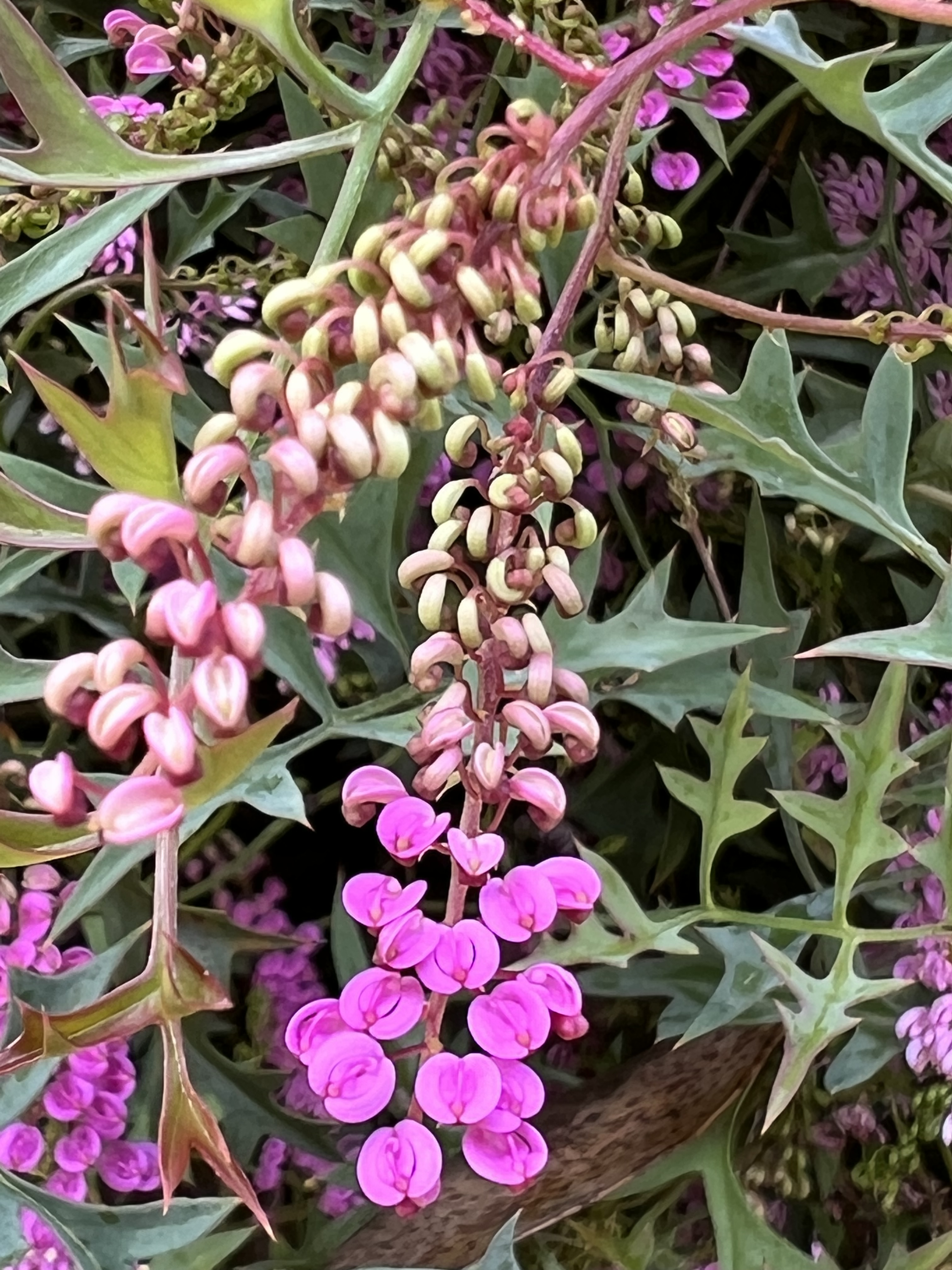

Conservation status
- Least Concern (IUCN 3.1)

Scientific classification
- Kingdom: Plantae
- Clade: Embryophytes
- Clade: Tracheophytes
- Clade: Angiosperms
- Clade: Eudicots
- Order: Proteales
- Family: Proteaceae
- Genus: Grevillea
- Species: G. leptobotrys

Binomial name
- Grevillea leptobotrys Meisn.

Synonyms
- Grevillea leptobotrys Meisn. var. leptobotrys; Grevillea leptobotrys var. simplicior F.Muell.

= Grevillea leptobotrys =

Tangled grevillea

Species of shrub endemic to Western Australia

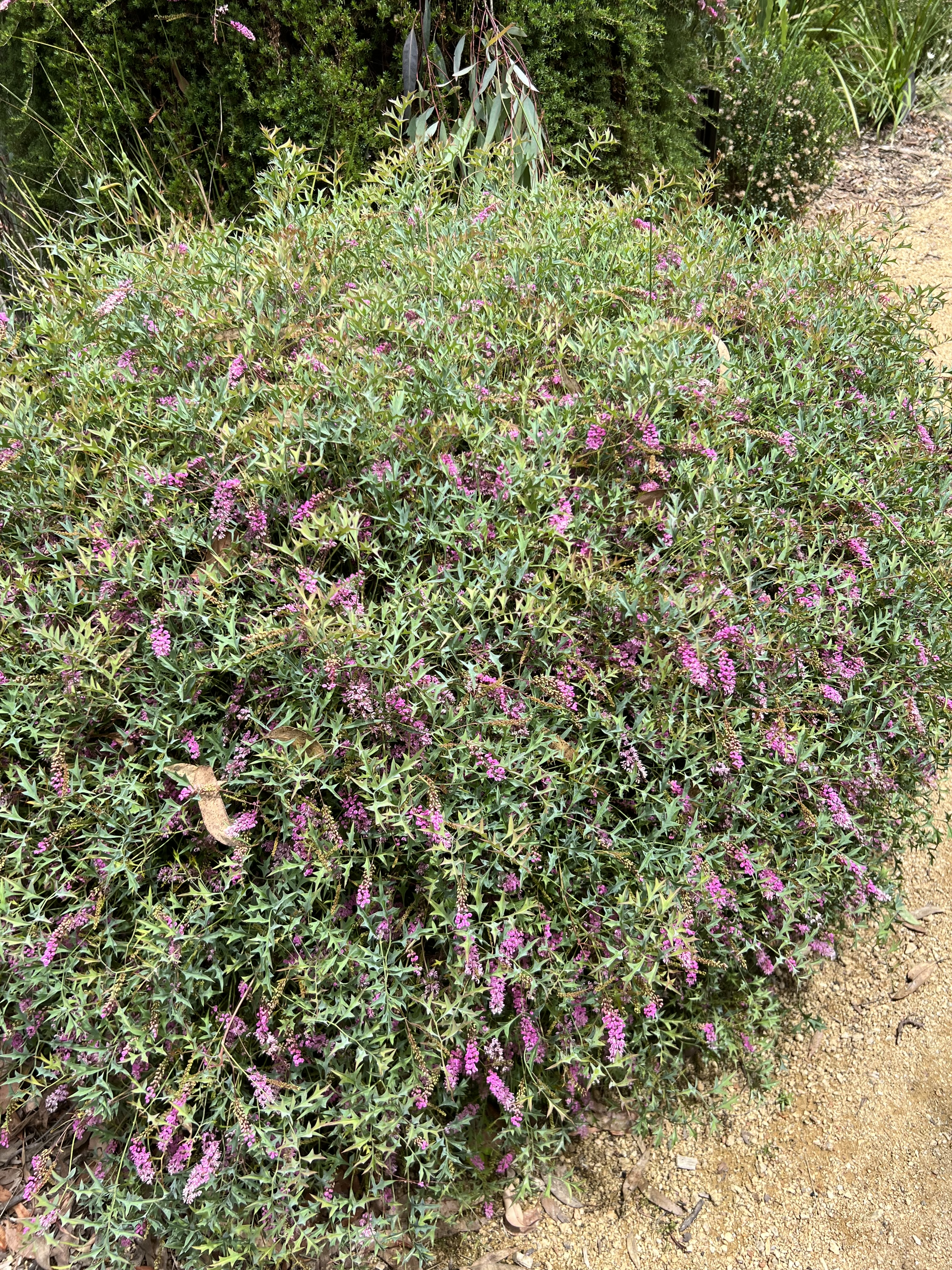
Habit

Grevillea leptobotrys, commonly known as tangled grevillea, is a species of flowering plant in the family Proteaceae and is endemic to the south-west of Western Australia. It is a prostrate shrub with simple and toothed, or divided leaves, the lobes further divided, the end lobes triangular, egg-shaped, oblong or more or less linear, and clusters of pale to deep lilac-pink flowers.

== Description ==
Grevillea leptobotrys is a prostrate shrub that typically grows to a height of 10–40 cm (3.9–15.7 in), its branchlets sometimes silky- or woolly-hairy. The leaves are variably-shaped, 30–290 mm (1.2–11.4 in) long, sometimes simple and toothed, otherwise divided with seven to fifteen lobes, sometimes further divided, the end lobes triangular to egg-shaped, oblong or more or less linear, 2–35 mm (0.079–1.378 in) long and 1–5 mm (0.039–0.197 in) wide. The flowers are arranged on the ends of branches in sometimes branched clusters on a rachis 30–50 mm (1.2–2.0 in) long and are pale to deep lilac-pink, the pistil 4–6 mm (0.16–0.24 in) long. Flowering mainly occurs from October to December, but flowers are present in most months. The fruit is an oval to club-shaped, red follicle 9–14 mm (0.35–0.55 in) long.

== Taxonomy ==
Grevillea leptobotrys was first formally described in 1848 by Carl Meissner in Johann Georg Christian Lehmann's Plantae Preissianae from specimens collected by James Drummond in the Swan River Colony. The specific epithet (leptobotrys) means "a slender bunch of grapes".

== Distribution and habitat ==
Tangled grevillea grows in woodland and shrubby forest in the area between Cranbrook, Brookton, North Bannister and Shannon in the Avon Wheatbelt, Jarrah Forest and Swan Coastal Plain bioregions of south-western Western Australia.

== Conservation status ==
This grevillea is listed as not threatened by the Western Australian Government Department of Biodiversity, Conservation and Attractions.

== See also ==
- List of Grevillea species
