= Asteromyrtus lysicephala =

Kennedy's heath

Scientific classification
- Kingdom: Plantae
- Clade: Embryophytes
- Clade: Tracheophytes
- Clade: Spermatophytes
- Clade: Angiosperms
- Clade: Eudicots
- Clade: Rosids
- Order: Myrtales
- Family: Myrtaceae
- Genus: Asteromyrtus
- Species: A. lysicephala

Binomial name
- Asteromyrtus lysicephala (F.Muell. & F.M.Bailey) Craven 1988 (1989)

Synonyms
- Melaleuca lysicephala F.Muell. & F.M.Bailey 1886; Agonis lysicephala (F.Muell. & F.M.Bailey) F.M.Bailey 1888; Sinoga lysicephala (F.Muell. & F.M.Bailey) S.T.Blake 1958

Species of tree

Asteromyrtus lysicephala, also known as Kennedy's heath, Lockhart River tea-tree, or as Saiya in Wasur (Indonesia), is a species of plant in the myrtle family Myrtaceae that is native to the Aru Islands, southern New Guinea and northern Australia.

== Description ==
The species grows mainly as a shrub to 3 m in height by 1.5 m across, occasionally as a small tree up to 13 m high. The leaves are small and the white to pale pink flowers the smallest of the genus.

== Distribution and habitat ==
In Australia, the species’ natural range is restricted to the Cape York Peninsula of northern Queensland and the Top End of the Northern Territory. In New Guinea it occurs in the Western Province of Papua New Guinea and in Papua, as well as in the Aru Islands of Indonesia. It grows in heathlands, open woodlands and seasonally flooded monsoon forests on sandy to clay soils.
