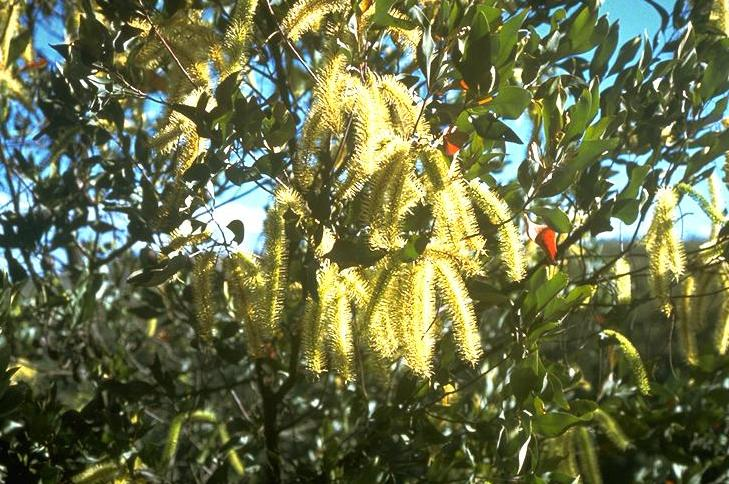

Conservation status
- Least Concern (IUCN 3.1)

Scientific classification
- Kingdom: Plantae
- Clade: Embryophytes
- Clade: Tracheophytes
- Clade: Angiosperms
- Clade: Eudicots
- Order: Proteales
- Family: Proteaceae
- Genus: Grevillea
- Species: G. glauca

Binomial name
- Grevillea glauca Banks & Solander ex Knight

Synonyms
- Grevillea gibbosa R.Br.

= Grevillea glauca =

Species of shrub endemic to Australia

Grevillea glauca, commonly known as bushman's clothes peg, cobblers peg tree, beefwood tree, nut wood, nalgo, or kawoj in New Guinea, is a species of flowering plant in the family Proteaceae and is native to Papua New Guinea and north-eastern Queensland. It is an erect, spindly shrub or small tree with narrowly egg-shaped to elliptic leaves, and cylindrical clusters of cream-coloured to greenish-white flowers.

== Description ==
Grevillea glauca is an erect, spindly shrub or tree that typically grows to a height of 2–10 m (6 ft 7 in – 32 ft 10 in) or more. Its leaves are narrowly egg-shaped to elliptic, 60–200 mm (2.4–7.9 in) long and 10–65 mm (0.39–2.56 in) wide and covered on both sides with soft hairs. The flowers are arranged on the ends of branches in cylindrical groups 60–180 mm (2.4–7.1 in) long and are cream-coloured to greenish-white, the pistil 14–16.5 mm (0.55–0.65 in) long. Flowering mainly occurs from April to August and the fruit is a more or less spherical, glabrous follicle 24–40 mm (0.94–1.57 in) long.

== Taxonomy ==
Grevillea glauca was first formally described in 1809 by Joseph Knight in On the cultivation of the plants belonging to the natural order of Proteeae, from an unpublished description by Joseph Banks and Daniel Solander of a plant discovered by Banks near the Endeavour River.

== Distribution and habitat ==
Bushman's clothes peg grows in a range of habitats including forest and woodland and occurs in Queensland from Cape York to Jericho and in Papua New Guinea.

== Conservation status ==
Grevillea glauca is currently listed as least concern on the IUCN Red List of Threatened Species. It is widely distributed and its population appears stable and locally common. There are no major threats affecting this species, either currently or in the near future, however it is threatened by land clearing for agriculture in some localised populations.
