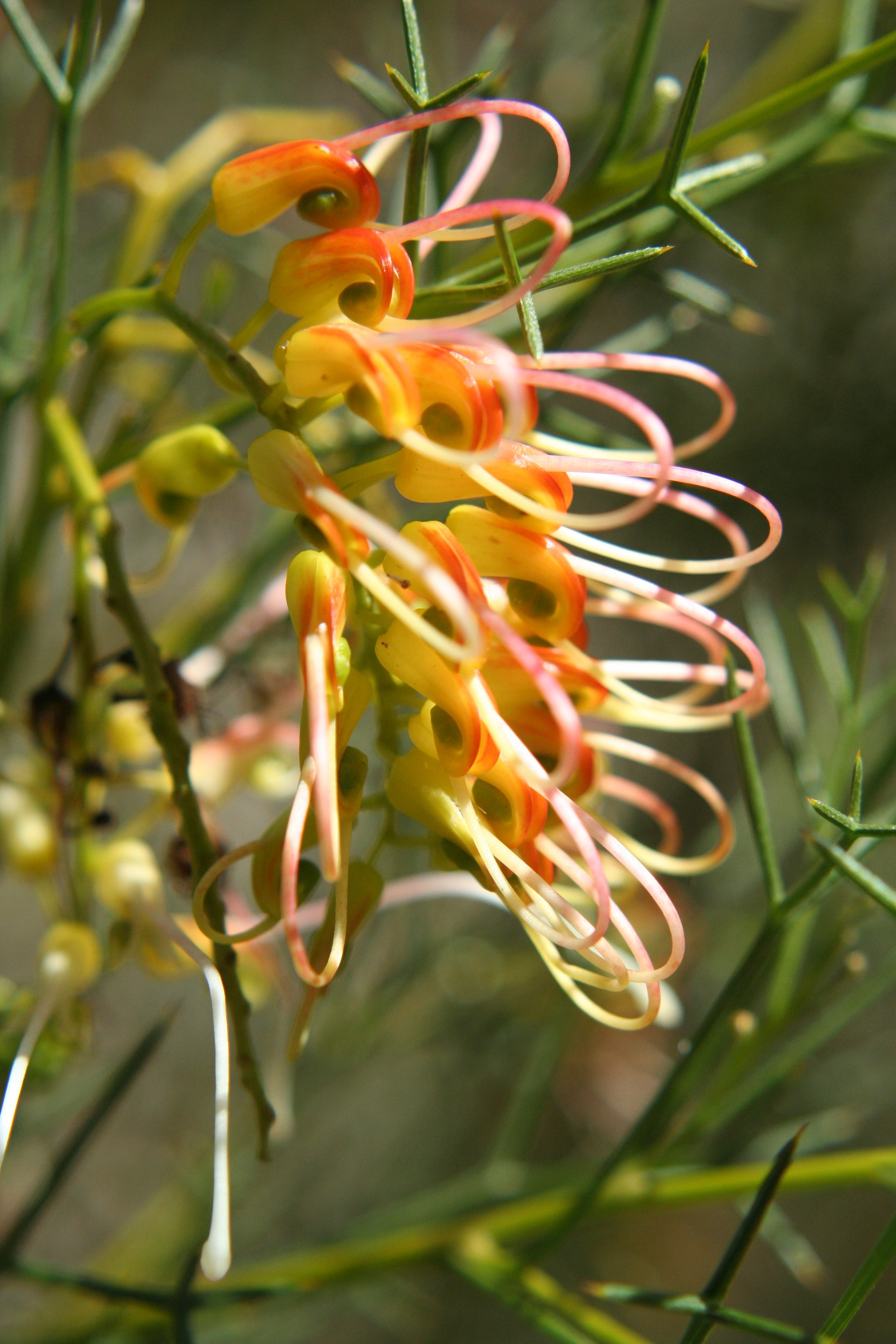

Conservation status
- Least Concern (IUCN 3.1)

Scientific classification
- Kingdom: Plantae
- Clade: Embryophytes
- Clade: Tracheophytes
- Clade: Spermatophytes
- Clade: Angiosperms
- Clade: Eudicots
- Order: Proteales
- Family: Proteaceae
- Genus: Grevillea
- Species: G. dielsiana

Binomial name
- Grevillea dielsiana C.A.Gardner

= Grevillea dielsiana =

Species of shrub native to Western Australia

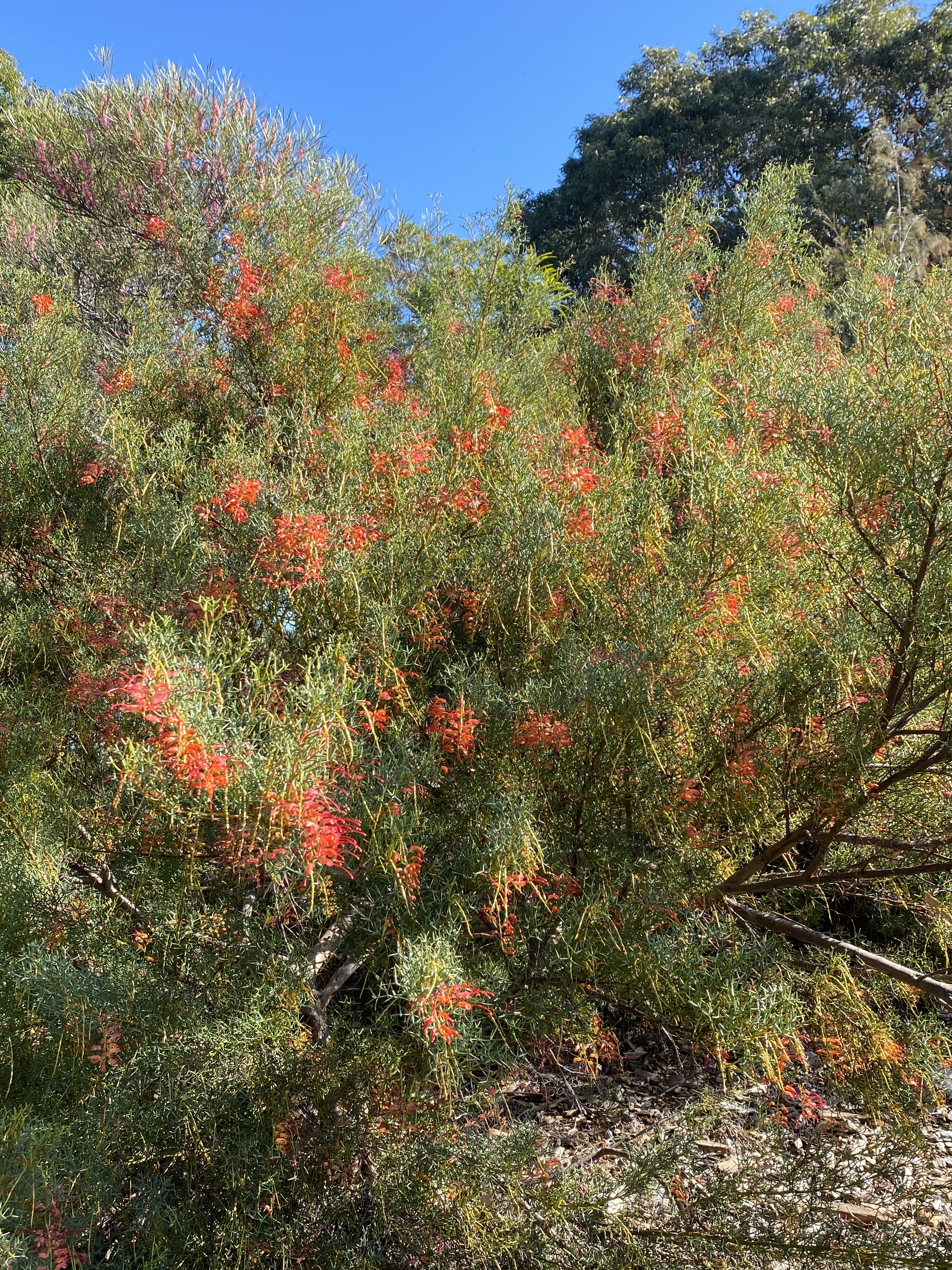
Habit

Grevillea dielsiana, commonly known as Diels grevillea, is a species of flowering plant in the family Proteaceae and is endemic to the south-west of Western Australia. It is a spreading shrub with divided leaves, the end lobes linear and tapering, and groups of red or orange flowers, often with streaks of pink or cream.

== Description ==
Grevillea dielsiana is a spreading shrub that typically grows to a height of 0.6–2 m (2 ft 0 in – 6 ft 7 in) and has glaucous branchlets. The leaves are 30–80 mm (1.2–3.1 in) long and have three lobes, each usually with three further lobes, the end lobes linear and tapering, 2–25 mm (0.079–0.984 in) long and 0.8–1.3 mm (0.031–0.051 in) wide. The flowers are arranged in groups on a rachis 20–40 mm (0.79–1.57 in) long and are red to orange, often with streaks of pink or cream, the pistil 26.5–36 mm (1.04–1.42 in) long. The style is red or pink, pale pink or white near the tip. Flowering occurs from August to September and the fruit is oblong to elliptic follicle 10–15 mm (0.39–0.59 in) long.

== Taxonomy ==
Grevillea dielsiana was first formally described in 1943 by Charles Gardner in the Journal of the Royal Society of Western Australia from material he collected near the Murchison River. The specific epithet (dielsiana) honours Ludwig Diels.

== Distribution and habitat ==
Diels grevillea grows in heath or shrubland between Geraldton, Mullewa and Shark Bay in the Avon Wheatbelt, Geraldton Sandplains and Yalgoo biogeographic regions of south-western Western Australia.

== Conservation status ==
Grevillea dielsiana is listed as least concern on the IUCN Red List and not threatened by the Western Australian Government Department of Parks and Wildlife It has a stable population and does not currently face any major threats.
