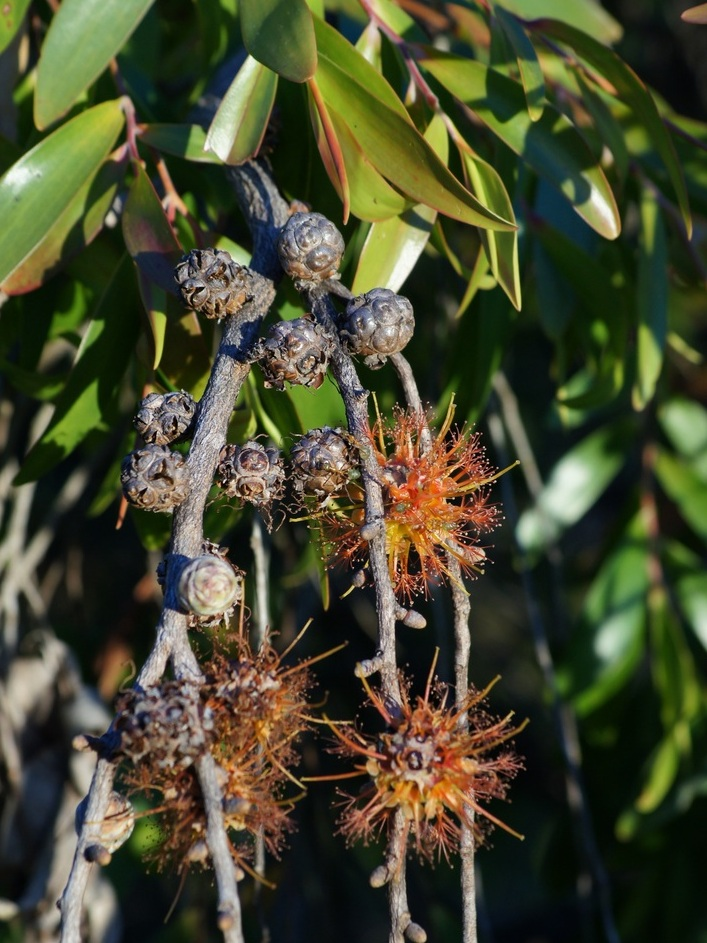
- Foliage, flowers and fruits of the Liniment Tree

Conservation status
- Least Concern (IUCN 3.1)

Scientific classification
- Kingdom: Plantae
- Clade: Tracheophytes
- Clade: Angiosperms
- Clade: Eudicots
- Clade: Rosids
- Order: Myrtales
- Family: Myrtaceae
- Genus: Asteromyrtus
- Species: A. symphyocarpa

Binomial name
- Asteromyrtus symphyocarpa (F.Muell.) Craven 1988 (1989)

Synonyms
- Melaleuca symphyocarpa F.Muell. 1859; Myrtoleucodendron symphyocarpum (F.Muell.) Kuntze 1891

= Asteromyrtus symphyocarpa =

Species of tree

Asteromyrtus symphyocarpa, also known as the liniment tree, is a species of plant in the myrtle family Myrtaceae that is native to New Guinea and northern Australia.

== Description ==
In Australia, the species grows as a multi-stemmed shrub or small tree, usually to a height of 3–12 m, but can exceed that in New Guinea. It has delicate weeping, aromatic foliage, bright yellow to orange flowers in globular inflorescences, and seed pods along the branches.

== Distribution and habitat ==
The species is adapted to infertile, acidic and waterlogged soils in the lowland tropics around the Gulf of Carpentaria. It is found in southern New Guinea in the Western Province of Papua New Guinea and in Papua Province in Western New Guinea. It also occurs across much of northern Australia from the Top End of the Northern Territory eastwards to the Cape York Peninsula of Far North Queensland.
