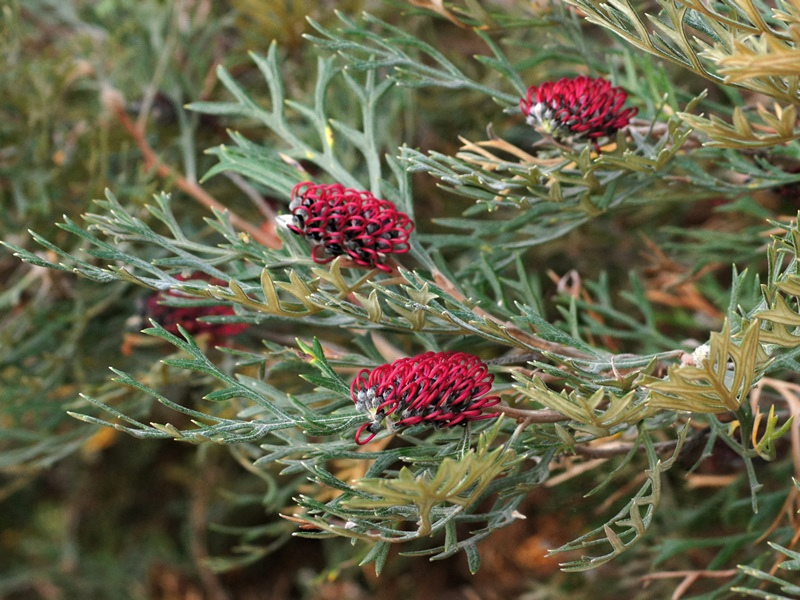
- In Brisbane Botanic Gardens

Conservation status
- Endangered (IUCN 3.1)

- Endangered (EPBC Act)

Scientific classification
- Kingdom: Plantae
- Clade: Embryophytes
- Clade: Tracheophytes
- Clade: Angiosperms
- Clade: Eudicots
- Order: Proteales
- Family: Proteaceae
- Genus: Grevillea
- Species: G. beadleana

Binomial name
- Grevillea beadleana McGill.

= Grevillea beadleana =

Beadle's grevillea

Species of shrub endemic to New South Wales, Australia

Grevillea beadleana, (/biːdlɑːrnɑː/) commonly known as Beadle's grevillea, is an endangered species of flowering plant in the family Proteaceae and is endemic to north-eastern New South Wales. It is a shrub with dissected leaves and grey to purplish flowers with a burgundy to scarlet style.

== Description ==
Grevillea beadleana is a shrub that typically grows to a height of 0.8–2.5 m (2 ft 7 in – 8 ft 2 in). Its leaves are mostly pinnatipartite, 80–165 mm (3.1–6.5 in) long and 50–105 mm (2.0–4.1 in) wide in outline, the ultimate lobes triangular and 20–110 mm (0.79–4.33 in) wide at the base. The lower surface of the leaves is densely covered with curled hairs.

The flowers are arranged in one-sided racemes in groups of twenty to ninety on the ends of branches, the rachis 35–50 mm (1.4–2.0 in) long. The flowers are grey to purplish with a burgundy to scarlet style, the pistil 15–18.5 mm (0.59–0.73 in) long. There are prominent bracts 5.7–6.2 mm (0.22–0.24 in) long at the base of the flowers, but that are lost as the flowers open. Flowering mainly occurs in late spring and summer.

The fruit is a woolly-hairy follicle 9.0–10.5 mm (0.35–0.41 in) long containing 1–2 ellipsoidal seeds measuring approximately 9 mm (0.35 in) long and 4 mm (0.16 in) wide. Seeds reach maturity at about four weeks where the follicle will split open and release the seeds into the soil below.

== Taxonomy ==
Grevillea beadleana was first collected in 1887 near Walcha. No further specimens were found since then and the species was thought to be extinct until it was rediscovered in 1981 by John Beaumont Williams near Chaelundi Falls in Guy Fawkes River National Park. The type specimen was collected in June 1992 and brought to the National Herbarium of NSW.

Donald McGillivray formally described it in 1986 in his book New Names in Grevillea (Proteaceae), based on the specimens collected by Williams in 1982 which had similar morphology to the initial specimen from 1887. The specific epithet (beadleana) honours botanist Professor Noel Beadle who was Emeritus Professor of Botany at the University of New England and co-author of Flora of the Sydney Region.

Beadle's grevillea is of the 'toothbrush' inflorescence type. Similar and closely related species include Caley's grevillea, (G. caleyi) Acanthus-leaved grevillea, (G. acanthifolia) G. aspleniifolia, G. longifolia and G. willsii, many of which are also threatened.

== Distribution and habitat ==
Beadle's grevillea grows in forest and woodland in shallow soil over granite, and occurs in four known populations. Most plants occur north of Torrington, the remainder in the Oxley Wild Rivers National Park, the Guy Fawkes River National Park and in the Orara River catchment.

The first recorded specimen was found near Walcha in 1887. Despite extensive searches, the species has not been rediscovered there and is presumed locally extinct. Another population was discovered in Enmore in November 1999 which is geographically the closest to and most resembles the specimen collected in 1887.

== Ecology ==
=== Fire ecology ===
Like many other related Grevillea species such as G. caleyi and G. barklyana, this species is largely reliant on low-intensity fires for seedling germination. While fire very often kills adult plants, it encourages the germination of seeds stored in the soil seed bank.

In 1988, a bush fire burned 1.5 (3.7 acres) hectares out of the 4.25 hectares (10.5 acres) of Guy Fawkes River National Park and killed approximately half (321 out of 647) of the area's G. beadleana population. The following year, 388 seedlings were found in the burnt area and only 21 in the unburnt area.

In 1994, a very intense bush fire occurred in the same area. In August 1995, 84 dead mature plants, 117 plants greater than 2 years old and 450 seedlings were found. The total population of plants (both seedlings and mature plants) in the Guy Fawkes River National Park was reduced from 735 to 567 as a result of fires occurring too frequently within the area. A fire interval of around 15 years between fires is optimal for regeneration to allow seedlings enough time to reach maturity and a sufficient soil seed bank to develop.

A study conducted in 1996 involved four samples of 23–29 wild-collected and soil-stored seeds being heated for 10 minutes at temperatures of 23 °C (73 °F), 50 °C (122 °F), 100 °C (212 °F) and 165 °C (329 °F). The seeds were then transferred to a growth cabinet and monitored for germination for 20 days. The seeds heated at 100 °C had the highest success rate with 72% of the seeds germinating. The seeds heated at 165 °C had the lowest, with only 14% of seeds germinating. Around half of the seeds heated at the lower temperatures (57% of 23 °C and 48% of 50 °C) successfully germinated.

=== Pollinators ===
Grevillea beadleana is able to self-pollinate though it is also likely pollinated by nectarivorous birds and bees. Potential bird pollinators include the spiny-cheeked honeyeater, yellow-tufted honeyeater, white-naped honeyeater, brown-headed honeyeater, fuscous honeyeater and the eastern spinebill, all of which belonging to the honeyeater family Meliphagidae. Both native bees and European honeybees collect nectar from the flowers, with the latter taking nectar from flowers that have not yet opened, potentially making the flowers less desirable to native pollinators.

== Conservation status ==
Grevillea beadleana is listed as 'Endangered' on the IUCN Red List of Threatened Species, under the Australian Government Environment Protection and Biodiversity Conservation Act 1999 and the New South Wales Government Threatened Species Conservation Act 1995. Under the IUCN's assessment published in 2020, the population of mature individuals is estimated between 3,000–12,000. The main threats to the species include inappropriate fire regimes, grazing by native animals and by livestock, and illegal collection.

In 2003, a NSW couple; Ms Catherine Wright and Mr Andrew Menzies bought a rural property south of Armidale where a large subpopulation (one of only four known subpopulations) of several hundred Beadle's grevillea was present. The previous owner had notified them of the presence of these grevilleas and the couple conserves half of the land in partnership with the NSW Biodiversity Conservation Trust (BCT), including the areas where the grevilleas are found.

In 2019, a drought struck the region and the plants were under threat as the species is intolerant of dry soils and extended drought. Mr Menzies bought a 1,000 litre water tank and watered the grevilleas during the drought, increasing their chance of survival. The plants persisted and in 2024 the plants bloomed heavily following La Nina rain events and caretaking activities.
