= Prickly grevillea =

Prickly grevillea may refer to:

- Grevillea aquifolium
- Grevillea halmaturina
