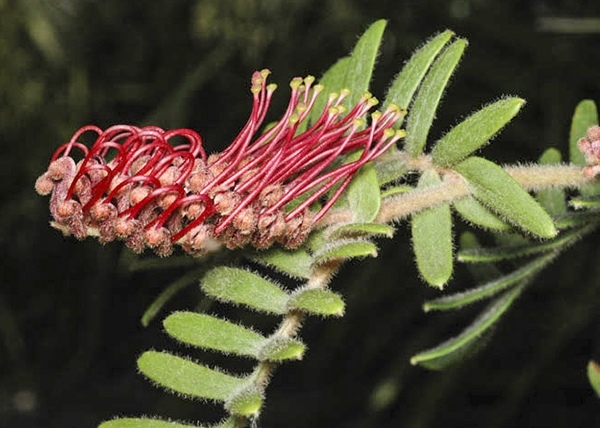
- In Australian National Botanic Gardens, Canberra

Conservation status
- Critically Endangered (IUCN 3.1)

- Critically endangered (EPBC Act)

Scientific classification
- Kingdom: Plantae
- Clade: Tracheophytes
- Clade: Angiosperms
- Clade: Eudicots
- Order: Proteales
- Family: Proteaceae
- Genus: Grevillea
- Species: G. caleyi

Binomial name
- Grevillea caleyi R.Br.

Synonyms
- Grevillea blechnifolia Hook. nom. inval., pro syn.; Stylurus caleyi (R.Br.) Pedro nom. rej.

= Grevillea caleyi =

Caley's grevillea

Species of shrub endemic to Australia

Grevillea caleyi, also known as Caley's grevillea, is a critically endangered species of flowering plant in the family Proteaceae, and is endemic to a restricted area around the Terrey Hills and Belrose area in New South Wales. It is an open, spreading shrub, growing up to 4 m (13 ft) tall with deeply divided leaves with linear lobes, and fawn flowers with a maroon to red style.

== Description ==
Grevillea caleyi is an open, spreading shrub that typically grows 1–4 m (3 ft 3 in – 13 ft 1 in) tall and up to 4 m (13 ft) wide. It has characteristic, deeply divided "herringbone" leaves that are comparatively large in size, 70–180 mm (2.8–7.1 in) long and 30–75 mm (1.2–3.0 in) wide with 19 to 36 linear to lance-shaped lobes, with the narrower end towards the base. The lobes are 15–35 mm (0.59–1.38 in) long, 2–6 mm (0.079–0.236 in) wide with the edges turned downwards, and hairy on the lower surface.

The flowers are arranged in toothbrush-like groups on a rachis 40–80 mm (1.6–3.1 in) long. The perianth is fawn with a villous outside. The pistil is 25–28 mm (0.98–1.10 in) long with a maroon-red style and a green pollen presenter at the tip. Flowering is sporadic and occurs throughout the year, mostly from August to December. Fruit is a woolly hairy follicle 17–21 mm (0.67–0.83 in) long with reddish brown stripes or blotches. A single, woody ellipsoidal seed 15–20 mm (0.59–0.79 in) long and 4–5 mm (0.16–0.20 in) wide is contained inside each follicle.

It is a distinctive and easily recognisable species, most closely related to G. aspleniifolia.

== Taxonomy ==
Grevillea caleyi was first formally described in 1830 by Robert Brown in Supplementum primum prodromi florae Novae Hollandiae. The specific epithet and common name honours George Caley, who collected the holotype specimens in 1805 near Port Jackson.

== Distribution and habitat ==
Caley's grevillea is restricted to an area of 64 km^{2} (25 sq mi) in the suburbs of Terrey Hills, Belrose and Ingleside, and the endangered ecological community of Duffys Forest. It grows in woodland on iron-rich laterite sandstone soils on ridgetops between elevations of 170 to 240 metres (560 to 790 ft) above sea level in open forest.

Species commonly associated with G. caleyi include the trees Corymbia gummifera, Eucalyptus sieberi, Eucalyptus haemastoma, Banksia serrata and Xylomelum pyriforme, the shrubs Acacia myrtifolia, Banksia spinulosa, Conospermum longifolium, Grevillea buxifolia, Hakea dactyloides, Lambertia formosa, Pimelea linifolia and Telopea speciosissima and herbaceous plants including Anisopogon avenaceus, Dampiera stricta, Lomandra glauca, Lomandra obliqua and Pteridium esculentum.

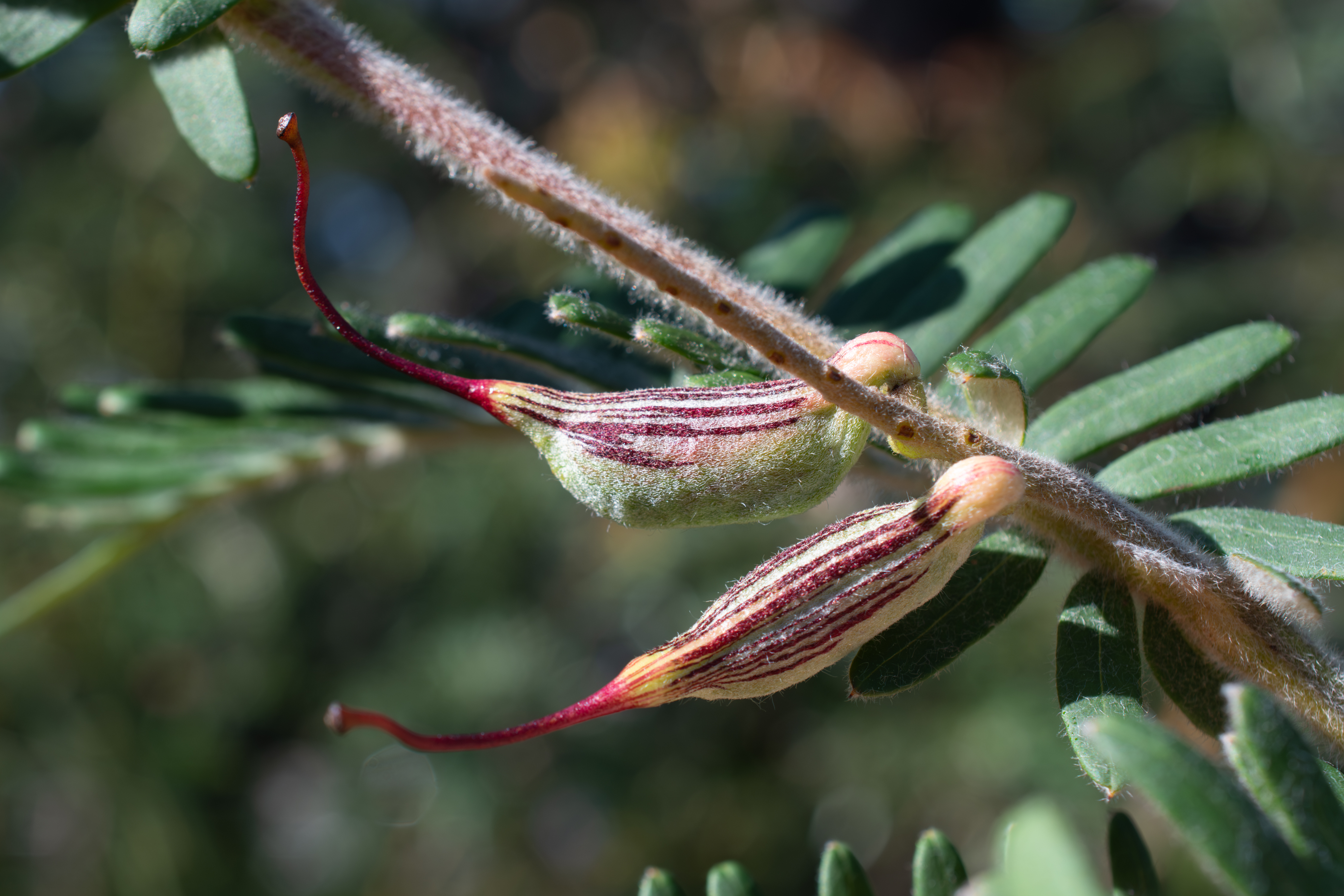
Close-up of mature follicles

== Ecology ==
=== Fire ecology ===
Unlike many other species of Australian Proteaceae, Grevillea caleyi does not form a lignotuber. Plants are killed by fire so this species entirely on seed that accumulates in the soil over time for regeneration. Although seedlings are not dependant on fire to germinate and can sprout in the total absence of bushfires, there is a preference for germination following low-intensity bushfires. Seedlings have been observed germinating in large numbers after recent bushfires and regenerative prescribed burns, suggesting that the seeds may remain dormant in the soil until growth is stimulated, perhaps by intense heat, smoke or exposure to bright sunlight.

=== Reproduction ===
This species is unusual among grevilleas in that it produces only one large seed per follicle, unlike the usual two seeds of most other Grevillea and related Proteaceae species. It has a low rate of fertility with approximately 3% of flowers resulting in seed and a low rate of seed dispersal. It is estimated that it takes 8–12 years for a sufficient seedbank (seed accumulating in the soil) to develop to be able to replace a population following a bushfire. Generally, seedlings are not able to produce flowers or seeds before 2–5 years of age. It is thought this species is self-compatible, meaning pollination can successfully occur in low population densities or even with individual plants.

=== Predation ===
The rate of seed predation for this species is very high. The fruits are predated on by parrots and insect larvae such as the weevil Cydmaea dorsalis while the seed is still developing in the follicle. Native mammals such as the bush rat (Rattus fuscipes) and the swamp wallaby (Wallabia bicolor) consume the seeds after they have matured and fallen to the ground. The eastern whipbird (Psophodes olivaceus) has been documented consuming the seeds by removing immature follicles from the plant and breaking them open to extract the unripe seeds.

=== Pollinators ===
This species is pollinated by birds. Through casual observations, the likely common pollinators for this species include honeyeaters such as New Holland honeyeater, white-eared honeyeater, white cheeked honeyeater and other birds such as the silvereye, little wattlebirds and Eastern spinebill.

== Conservation ==
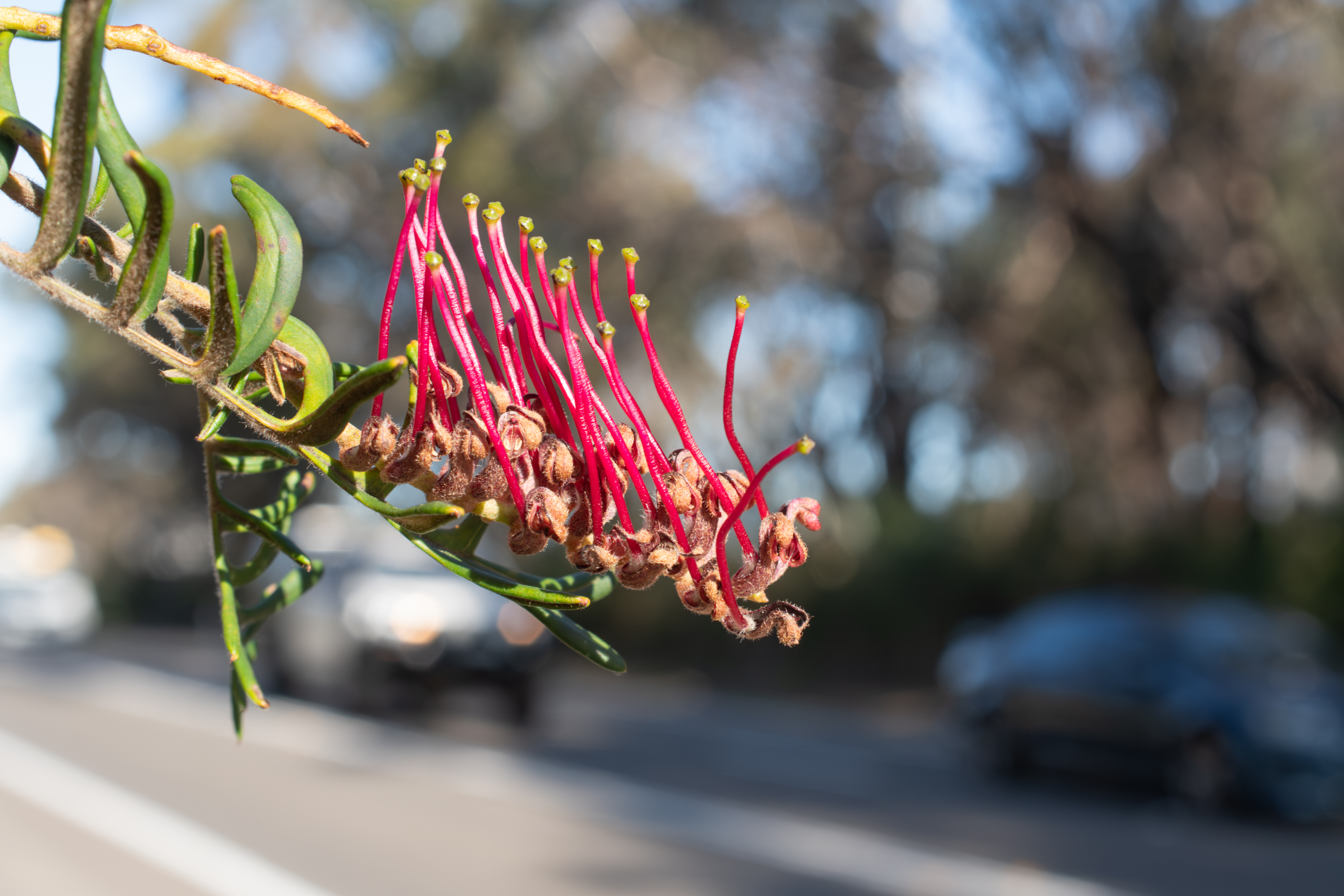
Growing on road verge in Terrey Hills

=== Conservation status ===
Caley's grevillea is listed as "critically endangered" on the IUCN Red List of Threatened Species. It is also listed as critically endangered and is protected under the Australian Government Environment Protection and Biodiversity Conservation Act 1999 and the New South Wales Government Biodiversity Conservation Act 2016.

=== Threats ===
The greatest threat to this species is habitat loss, mainly through residential and commercial development. Approximately 85% of this species' suitable habitat has been lost, with much of the habitat loss occurring in the 20th century. Additional clearing for the widening of Mona Vale Road is resulting in further loss of habitat and is likely to result in the loss of individual plants. The current population is severely fragmented and both the population and quality of its habitat is are in continuous decline. The most recent population estimates suggest the number of mature individual plants may be as low as 500–1000. In 2020, the IUCN estimated the current extent of occurrence (EOO) of this species to be 37 km^{2} (14 sq mi) and the area of occupancy at only 8 km^{2} (3.1 sq mi).

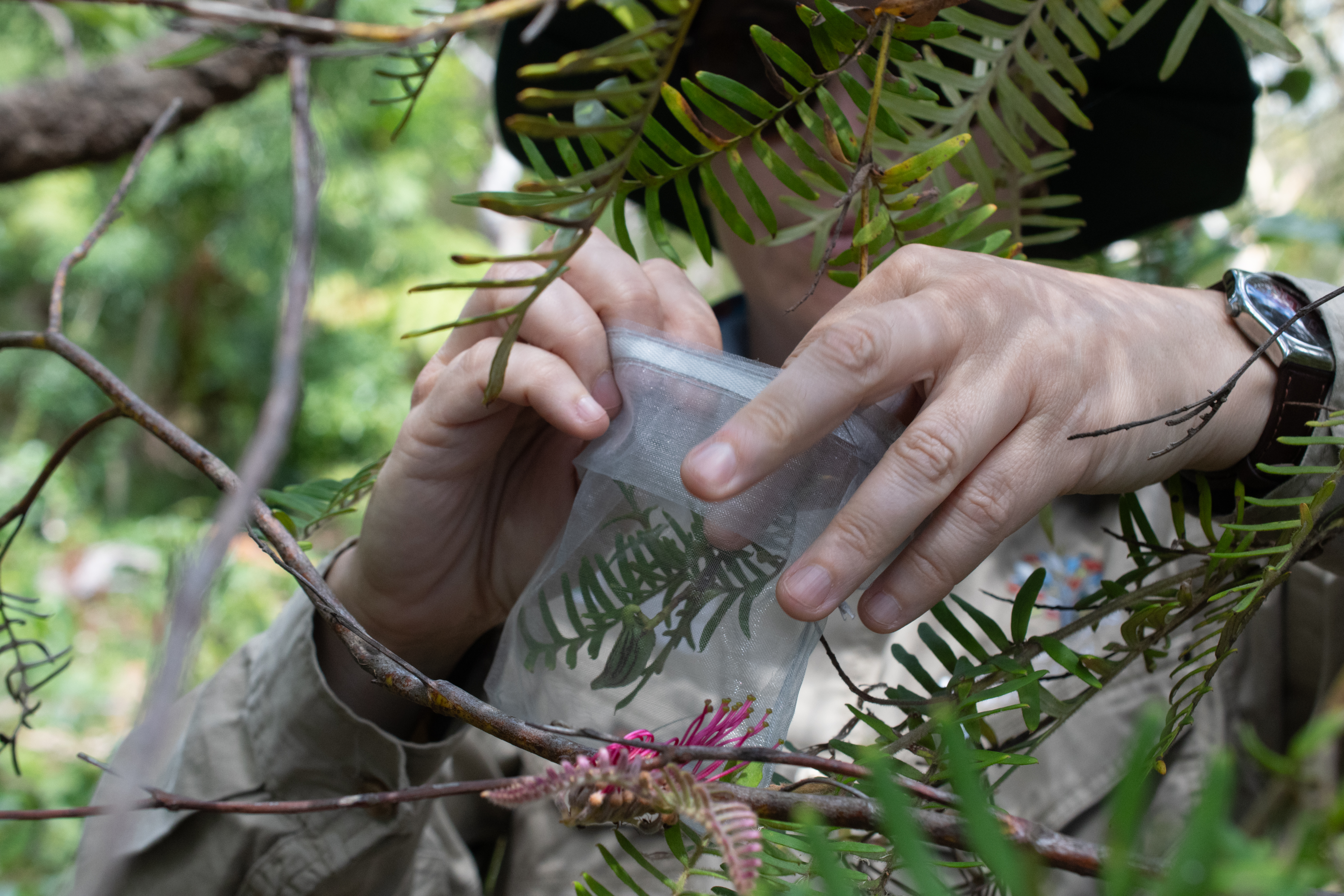
A worker from the Mount Annan Botanical Garden places a bag over the follicle or seed pod of a Grevillea caleyi to collect the seed inside.

It became locally extinct in one area in 2011 and a quantitive analysis by the Threatened Species Scientific Committee suggests the likelihood of another local extinction is greater than 50% in the next three generations due to habitat loss in one particular area.

Inappropriate fire regimes are another significant threat to the species. Fire is believed to play an important role in the recruitment process, as mature plants are uncommon in sites which have remained unburned for 15–20 years and seedlings sprout prolifically following bushfire events. Since individual plants take 2–5 years to reach maturity and 8–12 years are required to produce a sufficient number of seeds to regenerate a population after fire events, too frequent or too infrequent wildfires pose a major threat. Fires that occur too frequently would prevent plants from reaching maturity and producing a sufficient seedbank. Many populations are at risk of being heavily impacted or lost through too frequent fires.

Other significant, known threats to this species include weed invasion, particularly by Lantana (Lantana camara), Privet (Ligustrum sp.), Crofton weed (Ageratina adenophora) Blackberry (Rubus anglocandicans), Pampas Grass (Cortaderia selloana), Cotoneaster sp. and Acacia saligna, pathogens such as Phytophthora cinnamomi, habitat disturbance through recreational activities (eg. bike trails, horse riding) and illegal rubbish dumping.

== Use in horticulture ==
Caley's grevillea is occasionally grown as an ornamental plant, and has been grown in a variety of gardens across Australia. Like most grevilleas, it grows best in well-drained, acidic, gravelly or sandy loam soil in a sunny position for optimal flowering, though it will also grow in some shade. It tolerates frosts to at least −6 °C (21 °F) and can tolerate extended dry periods, but not drought. It is usually propagated from seed and will self-sow in the garden, but it may also be readily propagated from cuttings or grafted onto rootstock, usually G. robusta, which allows it to grow in a wider variety of soils. Grafted G. caleyi tend to be hardier and live longer than plants grown from seed.

It hybridises easily with other related grevillea species, such as with G. aspleniifolia and G. longifolia, which has resulted in a large variety of hybrids and cultivars becoming available, including several 'Poorinda' varieties such as 'Poorinda Empress' and 'Poorinda Emblem'. The cultivar Grevillea 'Ivanhoe' is said to be a hybrid between G. caleyi and G. longifolia.
