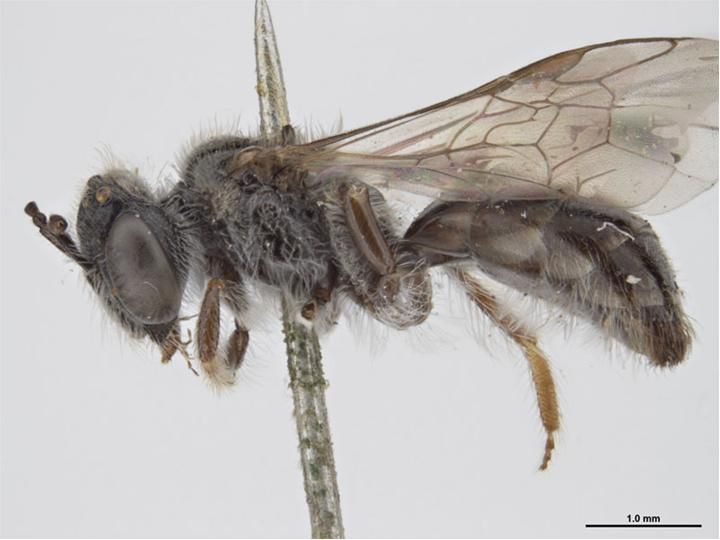
- Female

Scientific classification
- Kingdom: Animalia
- Phylum: Arthropoda
- Clade: Pancrustacea
- Class: Insecta
- Order: Hymenoptera
- Family: Colletidae
- Genus: Leioproctus
- Species: L. striatulus

Binomial name
- Leioproctus striatulus (Rayment, 1959)

Synonyms
- Filiglossa striatula Rayment, 1959; Filiglossa proxima Rayment, 1959

= Leioproctus striatulus =

Species of bee

Leioproctus striatulus, or Leioproctus (Euryglossidia) striatulus, is a species of bee in the family Colletidae and subfamily Colletinae. It is endemic to Australia. It was described by Australian entomologist Tarlton Rayment in 1959.

== Description ==
Female body length about 5 mm. Integumental colouration mainly black with reddish markings on the legs, hair white.

== Distribution and habitat ==
The species occurs in south-eastern Australia. The type locality is Patonga, New South Wales.

== Behaviour ==
The adults are solitary flying mellivores that nest gregariously in the ground. Flowering plants visited by the bees include Grevillea floribunda, Grevillea laurifolia, Grevillea speciosa and Boronia ledifolia.
