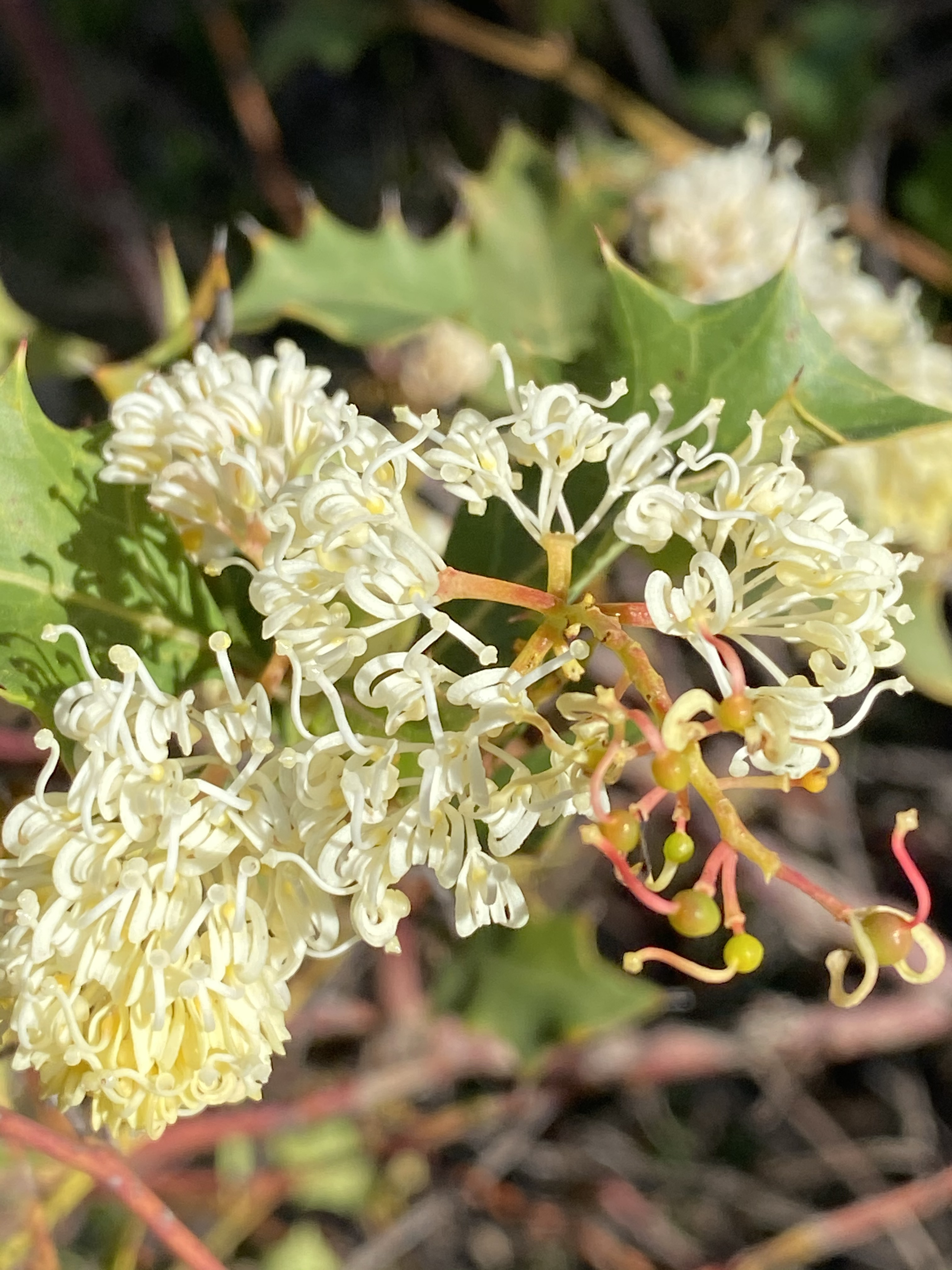
- In the Australian National Botanic Gardens

Conservation status
- Least Concern (IUCN 3.1)

Scientific classification
- Kingdom: Plantae
- Clade: Tracheophytes
- Clade: Angiosperms
- Clade: Eudicots
- Order: Proteales
- Family: Proteaceae
- Genus: Grevillea
- Species: G. monticola

Binomial name
- Grevillea monticola Meisn.

= Grevillea monticola =

Species of shrub endemic to Western Australia

Grevillea monticola is a species of flowering plant in the family Proteaceae and is endemic to the south-west of Western Australia. It is a spreading to erect shrub with toothed to pinnatifid leaves with sometimes branched clusters of pale cream-coloured to yellowish-cream flowers.

== Description ==
Grevillea monticola is a spreading to erect shrub that typically grows to a height of 0.3–1.6 m (1 ft 0 in – 5 ft 3 in) and has branchlets sometimes covered with silky hairs. The leaves are 25–65 mm (0.98–2.56 in) long, 15–40 mm (0.59–1.57 in) wide in outline, and toothed to pinnatisect with 5 to 13 teeth or shallow lobes on the edges. The lower surface of the leaves is sometimes silky-hairy. The flowers are arranged in sometimes branched clusters, each branch on a glabrous rachis 15–40 mm (0.59–1.57 in) long. The flowers are pale cream-coloured to yellowish-cream, the pistil 6.5–8.5 mm (0.26–0.33 in) long. Flowering occurs from June to October and the fruit is an oval to elliptic follicle 8–12 mm (0.31–0.47 in) long.

== Taxonomy ==
This species was first formally described in 1839 by John Lindley, who gave it the name Anadenia aquifolium in A Sketch of the Vegetation of the Swan River Colony. In 1848, Carl Meissner moved it to the Grevillea genus, but since the name Grevillea aquifolium was unavailable, having been used for a different species, changed the name to Grevillea monticola in Johann Georg Christian Lehmann's Plantae Preissianae. The specific epithet (monticola) means "a dweller in mountains".

== Distribution and habitat ==
Grevillea monticola grows in forest and woodland with jarrah and wandoo on sandy or loamy soils over laterite, granite and ironstone and is found mainly in the Darling Range between Kelmscott, Beverley, Pingelly and Wandering, in the Avon Wheatbelt and Jarrah Forest bioregions of south-western Western Australia.

== Ecology ==
This grevillea regenerates from seed only.

== See also ==
- List of Grevillea species
