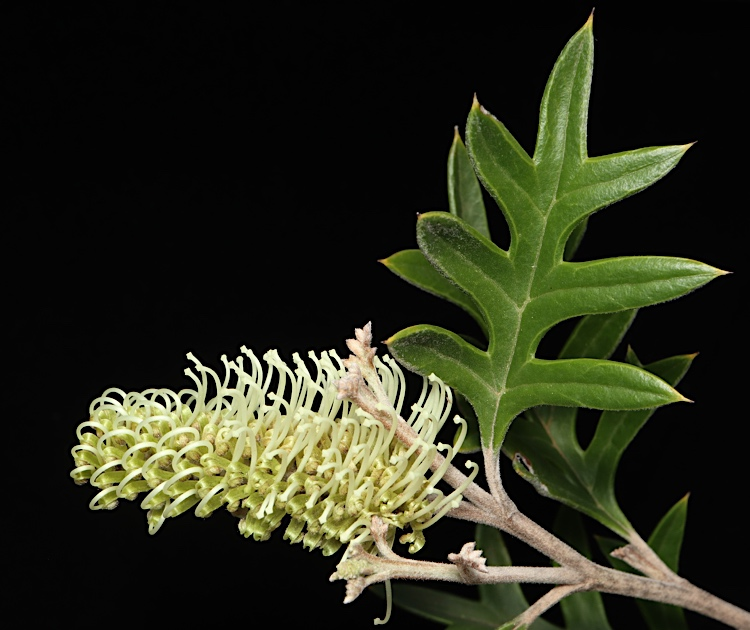
- In the Australian National Botanic Gardens

Scientific classification
- Kingdom: Plantae
- Clade: Tracheophytes
- Clade: Angiosperms
- Clade: Eudicots
- Order: Proteales
- Family: Proteaceae
- Genus: Grevillea
- Species: G. willisii

Binomial name
- Grevillea willisii R.V.Sm. & McGill.

Synonyms
- Grevillea sp. (Rock Grevillea) p.p.; Grevillea willisii R.V.Sm. & McGill. subsp. willisii; Grevillea ramosissima auct. non Meisn.: Stirling, J. (1883)

= Grevillea willisii =

Species of shrub endemic to Victoria, Australia

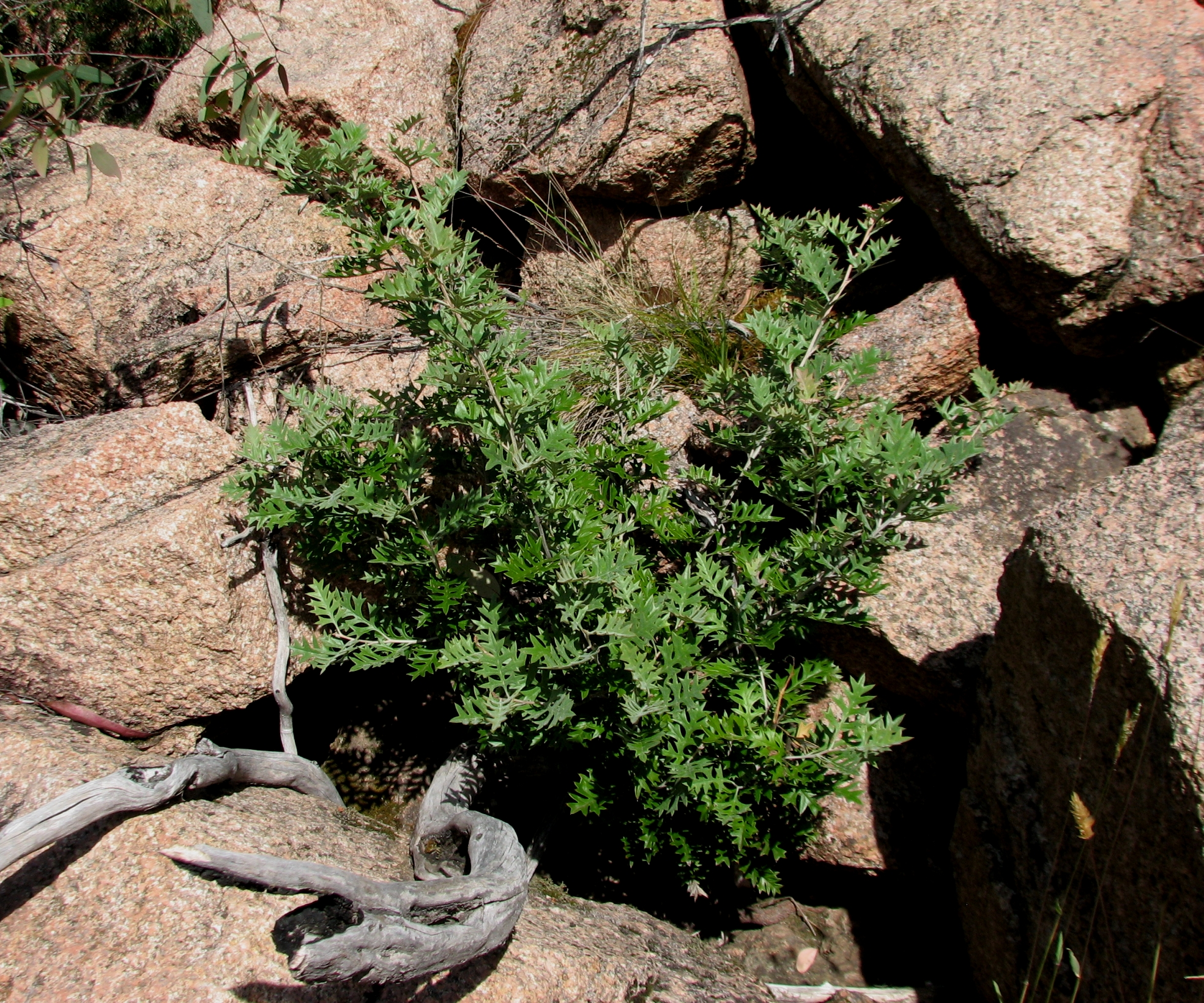
Habit near the Bundara River

Grevillea willisii, commonly known as Omeo grevillea or rock grevillea, is species of flowering plant in the family Proteaceae, and is endemic to the eastern highlands of Victoria, Australia. It is a spreading to erect shrub with pinnatipartite leaves, the end lobes broadly triangular to oblong and sometimes sharply pointed, and dense clusters of greenish-white to fawn-coloured flowers with a white to cream-coloured style.

== Description ==
Grevillea willisii is a spreading to erect shrub that typically grows to 2.0–4.5 m (6 ft 7 in – 14 ft 9 in) high, up to 3 m (9.8 ft) wide and has a generally greyish-green appearance. Its leaves are pinnatipartite, 25–135 mm (0.98–5.31 in) long and 20–65 mm (0.79–2.56 in) wide with 5 to 19 lobes that are sometimes divided up to a further 5 times. The end lobes are triangular to oblong, 5–25 mm (0.20–0.98 in) long and 3–17 mm (0.12–0.67 in) wide and sometimes sharply pointed, the lower surface densely covered with light-coloured, woolly hairs. The flowers are arranged on the ends of branches in erect clusters on one side of a woolly-hairy rachis 30–85 mm (1.2–3.3 in) long, the pistil 11–18 mm (0.43–0.71 in) long. The flowers are greenish-white to fawn-coloured with a white to cream-coloured style. Flowering occurs from September to January and the fruit is a softly-hairy follicle 8–11 mm (0.31–0.43 in) long.

== Taxonomy ==
Grevillea willisii first formally described in 1975 by Raymond Vaughan Smith and Donald McGillivray in the journal Muelleria, that was dedicated to commemorate the retirement of James Hamlyn Willis from the "National Herbarium, Melbourne" in 1972. The type specimens were collected by Smith near the bridge over the Bundara River on the Omeo Highway in 1966. The specific epithet honours James Hamlyn Willis, the Government Botanist of Victoria.

Buchan River grevillea, (G. pachylostyla) formerly known as G. willisii subsp. pachylostyla, from the upper reaches of the Buchan River, is similar to G. willisii, but was promoted to species status in 1994.

== Distribution and habitat ==
Omeo grevillea grows on rocky granite outcrops near streams in the eastern highlands of Victoria, the shorter-leaved form near Omeo in the vicinity of the Mitta Mitta River and its tributaries, and the longer-leaved form near Nariel Creek and Wheelers Creek in the Corryong district.

== Conservation status ==
Grevillea willisii is listed as "endangered" under the Victorian Government Flora and Fauna Guarantee Act 1988 and as "rare" in the Department of Environment and Primary Industries 2014 Advisory List of Rare Or Threatened Plants In Victoria.

== Use in horticulture ==
Plants may be grown to attract birds to a garden, providing both protection for nests and a source of nectar. Plants are occasionally affected by leaf miners or chlorosis of the leaves. The species may be propagated by semi-mature cuttings, which may take up to 5 months to produce roots.

The hybrid cultivar Grevillea 'Poorinda Anticipation' is a cross between G. longifolia and G. willisii. Grevillea 'Poorinda Royal Mantle' is a vigorous cultivar that was bred by Victorian plantsman Leo Hodge and registered in 1978; it is thought to be a hybrid between G. willisii and G. laurifolia.
