= Holly grevillea =

Holly grevillea is a common name for several plants and may refer to:

- Grevillea aquifolium, endemic to South Australia and Victoria
- Grevillea ilicifolia, native to Australia
