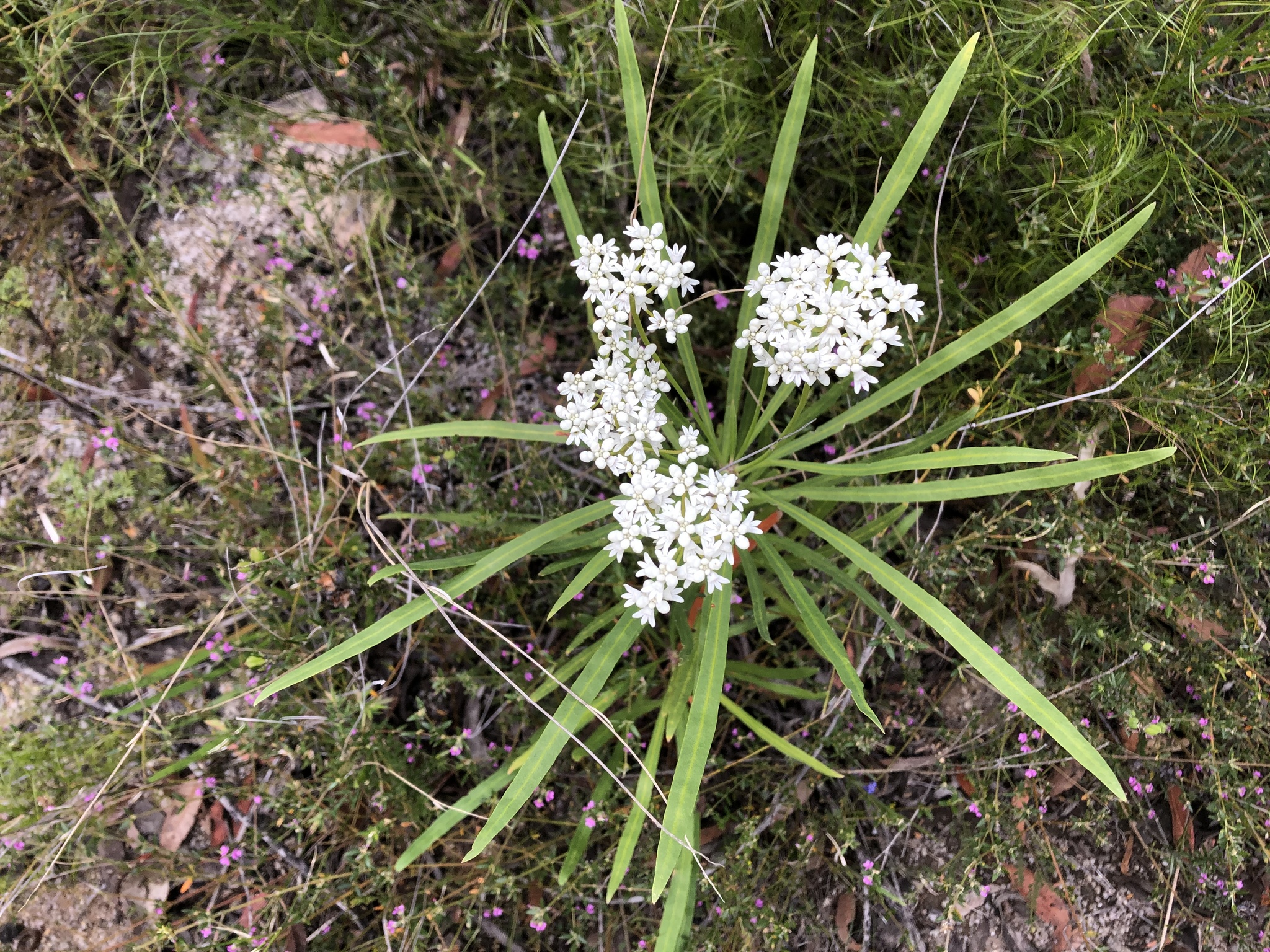
- In the Gibraltar Range National Park

Scientific classification
- Kingdom: Plantae
- Clade: Tracheophytes
- Clade: Angiosperms
- Clade: Eudicots
- Order: Proteales
- Family: Proteaceae
- Genus: Conospermum
- Species: C. burgessiorum

Binomial name
- Conospermum burgessiorum L.A.S.Johnson & McGill.

= Conospermum burgessiorum =

Species of shrub native to Australia

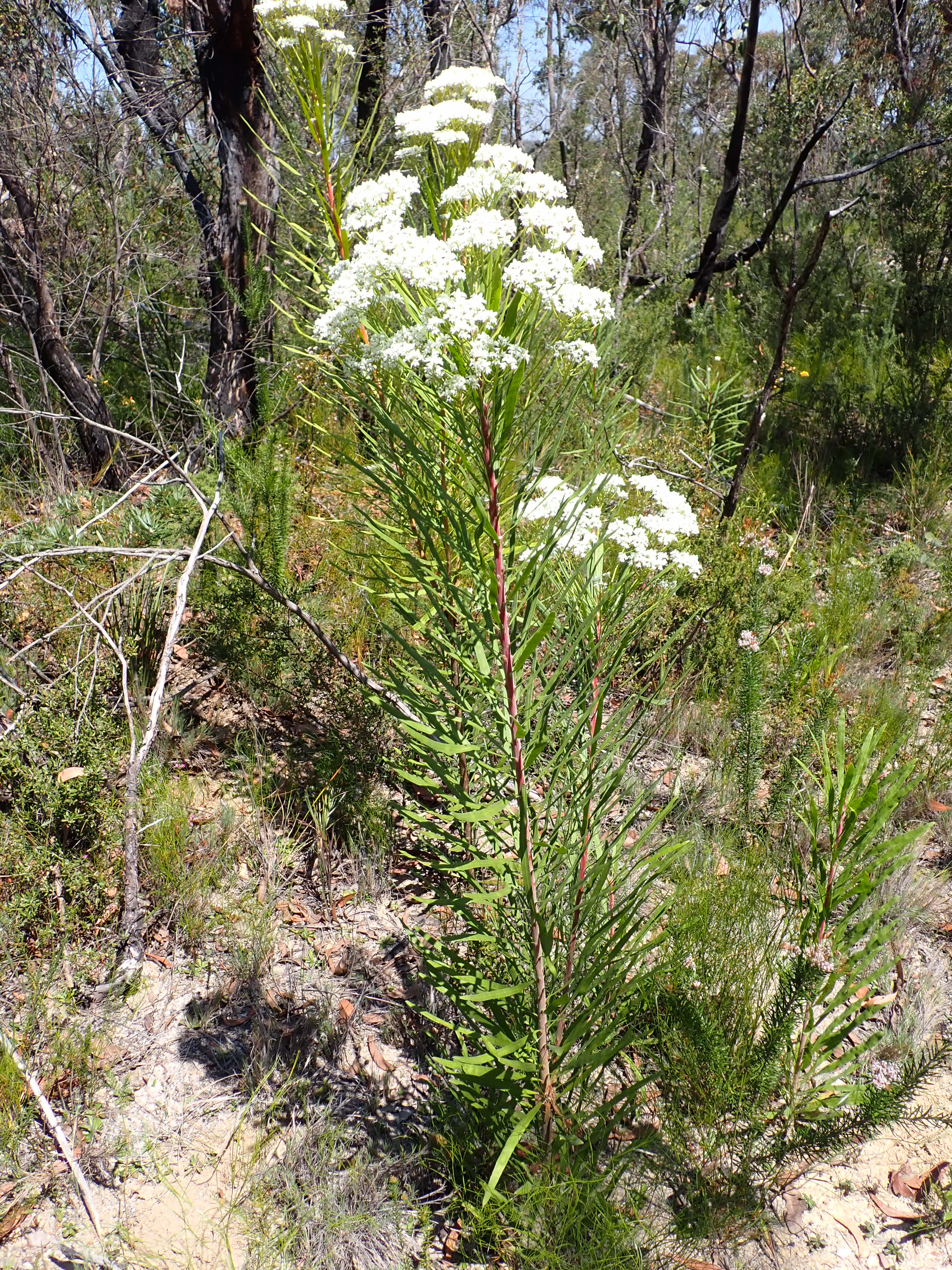
Habit in the Gibraltar Range National Park

Conospermum burgessiorum is a species of flowering plant in family Proteaceae and is endemic to eastern Australia. It is an erect to spreading shrub with linear leaves, panicles of cream-coloured to white flowers and reddish brown nuts.

== Description ==
Conospermum burgessiorum is an erect to spreading shrub that typically grows to a height of 1.5–3 m (4 ft 11 in – 9 ft 10 in) and has many branches, the new growth with fine hairs. The leaves are linear, mostly 120–200 mm (4.7–7.9 in) long and 4–10 mm (0.16–0.39 in) wide and slightly curved. Veins are visible on both surfaces of the leaves. The flowers are arranged in panicles in upper leaf axils on peduncles up to 10 mm (0.39 in) long. The bracts are 1.8–3 mm (0.071–0.118 in) long and blue, the perianth cream-coloured to white forming a tube 1.8–2.5 mm (0.071–0.098 in) long. The upper lip is 2.8–4 mm (0.11–0.16 in) long and 2.0–2.6 mm (0.079–0.102 in) wide, the lower lip joined for 1.7–2.5 mm (0.067–0.098 in) with lobes 1.5–2.0 mm (0.059–0.079 in) long and 0.9–2 mm (0.035–0.079 in) wide. Flowering occurs from September to December, and the fruit is a nut about 2.2 mm (0.087 in) long and wide with reddish-brown hairs.

== Taxonomy ==
Conospermum burgessiorum was first formally described in 1975 by Lawrie Johnson and Donald McGillivray in the journal Telopea from specimens they collected in the Gibraltar Range in 1966. The specific epithet (burgessiorum) honours Colin Burgess and his son Peter Burgess, who recognised this species as distinct from Conospermum longifolium.

== Distribution and habitat ==
This species of Conospermum usually grows in forest and woodland on soils derived from granite, in the Gibraltar Range National Park in northern New South Wales, and near Stanthorpe in south-eastern Queensland.
