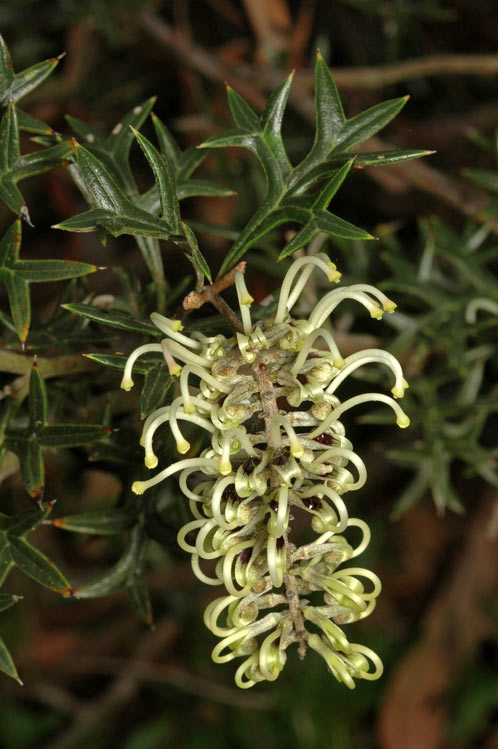
- In the Australian National Botanic Gardens

Scientific classification
- Kingdom: Plantae
- Clade: Tracheophytes
- Clade: Angiosperms
- Clade: Eudicots
- Order: Proteales
- Family: Proteaceae
- Genus: Grevillea
- Species: G. pachylostyla

Binomial name
- Grevillea pachylostyla (McGill.) Olde & Marriott

Synonyms
- Grevillea sp. (Rock Grevillea) p.p.; Grevillea willisii subsp. pachylostyla McGill.

= Grevillea pachylostyla =

Species of shrub endemic to Victoria, Australia

Grevillea pachylostyla, commonly known as Buchan River grevillea, is a species of flowering plant in the family Proteaceae and is endemic to Victoria in Australia. It is a mounded to almost prostrate shrub with divided leaves, the end lobes triangular, and usually down-curved, more or less toothbrush-like clusters of cream-coloured flowers that turn` pink to red after opening.

== Description ==
Grevillea pachylostyla is a mounded to almost prostrate shrub that typically grows to a height of up to 1.5 m (4 ft 11 in), its branchlets silky- or woolly-hairy. The leaves are 20–40 mm (0.79–1.57 in) long and 20–30 mm (0.79–1.18 in) wide in outline and divided with 5 to 11 lobes that are usually divided again, the end-lobes triangular, 5–12 mm (0.20–0.47 in) long and 2–3 mm (0.079–0.118 in) wide. The edges of the leaves curve downwards and the lower surface is densely hairy. The flowers are arranged down-curved clusters, mostly on one side of a rachis 30–50 mm (1.2–2.0 in) long. The flowers are cream-coloured at first, but soon turn pink then red with a black base, the pistil 16–18.5 mm (0.63–0.73 in) long. Flowering occurs from October to February and the fruit is a silky-hairy follicle about 12 mm (0.47 in) long.

== Taxonomy ==
Buchan River grevillea was first formally described in 1985 by Donald McGillivray who gave it the name Grevillea willisii subsp. pachylostyla in his book New Names in Grevillea (Proteaceae) from specimens collected by James Hamlyn Willis in 1964. In 1994, Peter Olde and Neil Marriott raised the subspecies to species status as Grevillea pachylostyla in The Grevillea Book. The specific epithet (pachylostyla) means "thick pillar", referring to the thickened style.

== Distribution and habitat ==
Grevillea pachylostyla grows on rocky granite outcrops near streams in the upper catchment of the Buchan River in north-eastern Victoria.

== Conservation status ==
This grevillea is listed as "critically endangered" under the Victorian Government Flora and Fauna Guarantee Act 1988 and as "Rare in Victoria" on the Department of Sustainability and Environment's Advisory List of Rare Or Threatened Plants In Victoria.
