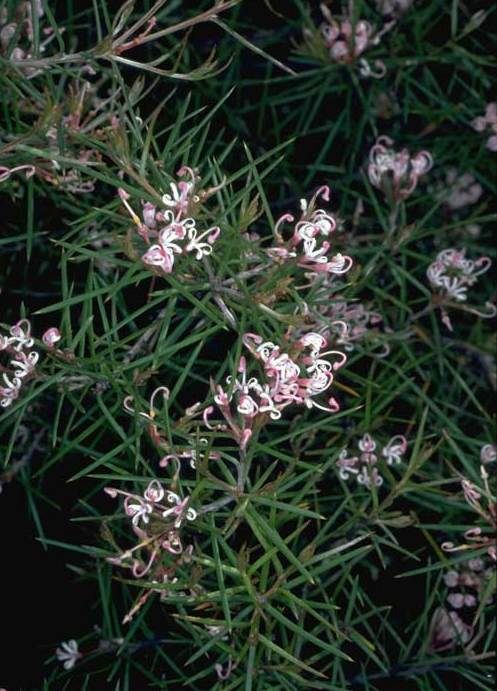

Conservation status
- Vulnerable (IUCN 3.1)

Scientific classification
- Kingdom: Plantae
- Clade: Embryophytes
- Clade: Tracheophytes
- Clade: Angiosperms
- Clade: Eudicots
- Order: Proteales
- Family: Proteaceae
- Genus: Grevillea
- Species: G. halmaturina

Binomial name
- Grevillea halmaturina Tate

Subspecies
- G. halmaturina Tate subsp. halmaturina; G. halmaturina subsp. laevis Makinson

Synonyms
- Grevillea parviflora var. acuaria F.Muell. ex Benth.; Hakea halmaturina F.Muell. nom. inval., nom. nud.

= Grevillea halmaturina =

Species of plant endemic to Australia

Grevillea halmaturina is a species of flowering plant in the family Proteaceae and is endemic to South Australia. It is a prickly, spreading to erect shrub with sharply-pointed, linear to more or less-cylindrical leaves and large groups of white to pale pink flowers.

== Description ==
Grevillea halmaturina is a prickly, spreading to erect shrub that typically grows to a height of 0.3–1.5 m (1 ft 0 in – 4 ft 11 in) and has ridged branchlets. Its leaves are sharply-pointed linear to more or less cylindrical or tapering, 10–30 mm (0.39–1.18 in) long and 0.8–1.2 mm (0.031–0.047 in) wide with the edges rolled under, enclosing most of the lower surface. The flowers are white to pale pink and are arranged in large, sessile groups on the ends of branches or in leaf axils, the pistil 6–8.5 mm (0.24–0.33 in) long. Flowering occurs from July to November and the fruit is a smooth, narrowly oval follicle 10–14 mm (0.39–0.55 in) long.

== Taxonomy ==
Grevillea halmaturina was first formally described in 1890 by Ralph Tate in his book A Handbook of the Flora of Extratropical South Australia. The specific epithet (halmaturina) is derived from Halmaturus, a name once applied to a genus of kangaroos, and commonly used for species from Kangaroo Island.

In 2000, Robert Owen Makinson described two subspecies of G. halmaturina in the Flora of Australia and the names are accepted by the Australian Plant Census:

- Grevillea halmaturina Tate subsp. halmaturina has leaves with conspicuous longitudinal ridges;
- Grevillea halmaturina subsp. laevis Makinson has smooth leaves, lacking the ridges of the autonym.

== Distribution and habitat ==
Both subspecies mostly grow in shrubby woodland, often in moister places. Subspecies halmaturina is endemic to Kangaroo Island and subspecies laevis is endemic to the southern part of the Eyre Peninsula.

== Conservation status ==
Grevillea halmaturina is listed as vulnerable on the IUCN Red List of Threatened Species. Much of its distribution has been cleared for agriculture, leaving it with a severely fragmented population and an estimated extent of occurrence of 14,393 km^{2} (5,557 sq mi). There is a continuing decline in both the number of mature individuals and the quality of habitat due to land clearing for agriculture. There are currently no conservation measures in place for this species, however, it is known to occur within protected areas, including national parks such as Flinders Chase National Park.
