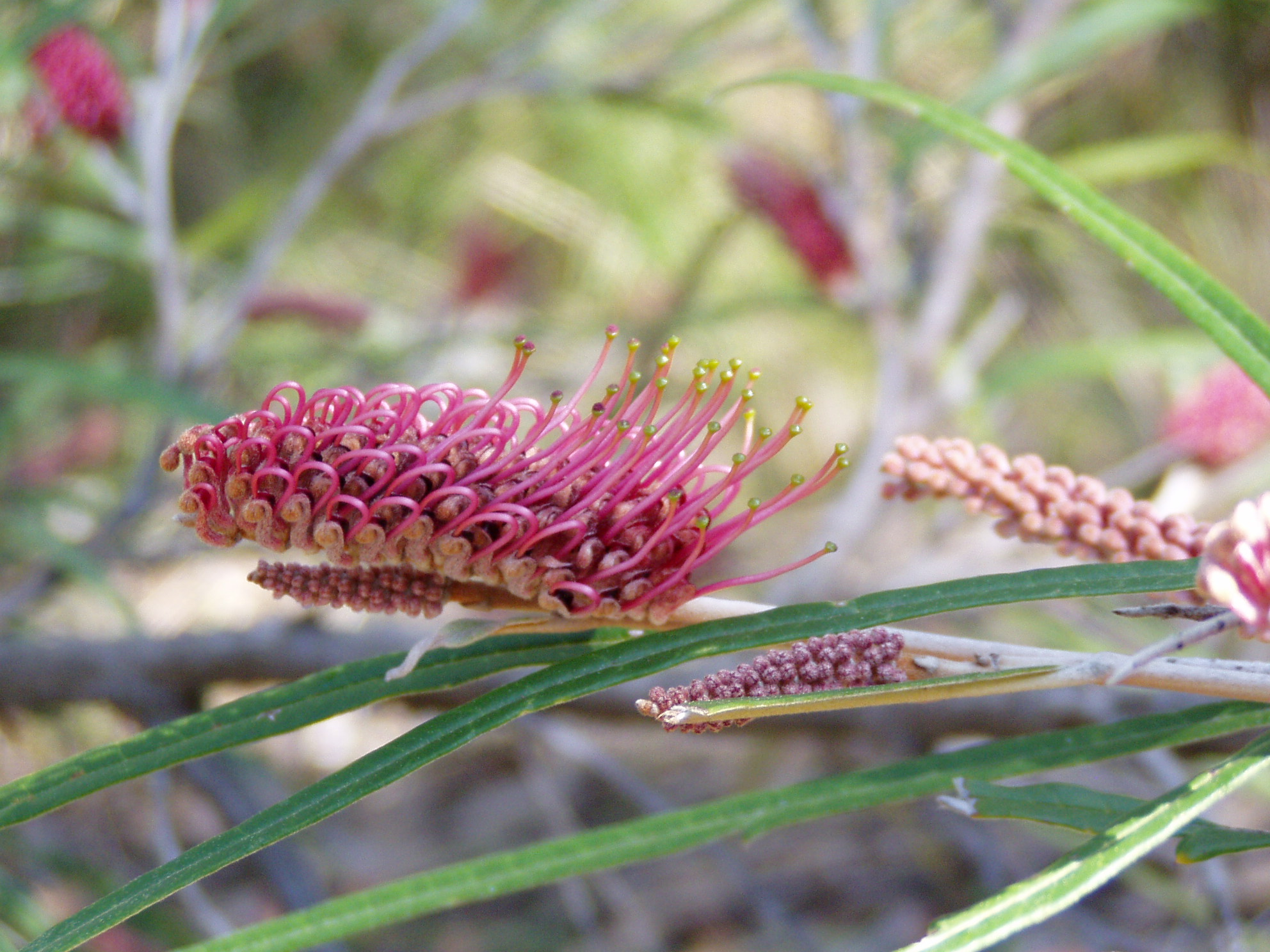
- In the Australian National Botanic Gardens

Conservation status
- Near Threatened (IUCN 3.1)

Scientific classification
- Kingdom: Plantae
- Clade: Embryophytes
- Clade: Tracheophytes
- Clade: Spermatophytes
- Clade: Angiosperms
- Clade: Eudicots
- Order: Proteales
- Family: Proteaceae
- Genus: Grevillea
- Species: G. aspleniifolia

Binomial name
- Grevillea aspleniifolia Knight

Synonyms
- Grevillea aspleniifolia R.Br. nom. illeg.; Grevillea aspleniifolia Knight var. aspleniifolia; Grevillea aspleniifolia var. shepherdiana F.Muell.; Grevillea aspleniifolia var. shepherdii Maiden & Betche nom. illeg.; Grevillea aspleniifolia var. typica Domin nom. inval.; Grevillea shepherdii Maiden & Betche nom. inval.; Grevillea van-houtteana Hook.f. nom. inval., pro syn.

= Grevillea aspleniifolia =

Species of plant endemic to New South Wales, Australia

Grevillea aspleniifolia, also known as fern leaf grevillea, is a species of flowering plant in the family Proteaceae and is endemic to eastern New South Wales. It is a spreading shrub with linear to narrowly egg-shaped leaves and purplish flowers.

== Description ==
Grevillea aspleniifolia is a spreading shrub that typically grows to 1–5 m (3 ft 3 in – 16 ft 5 in) high and up to 5 m (16 ft) wide. The leaves are linear to narrowly egg-shaped, 150–250 mm (5.9–9.8 in) long and 3–15 mm (0.12–0.59 in) wide with irregular serrations and a woolly-hairy lower surface, the edges turned down or rolled under. The flowers are arranged in toothbrush-like racemes along a rachis usually 30–50 mm (1.2–2.0 in) long, and are purplish with grey or white hairs. The pistil is mostly 15–25 mm (0.59–0.98 in) long and the style has a green tip. Flowering mainly occurs from July to November and the fruits is a hairy follicle 11–12 mm (0.43–0.47 in) long.

=== Similar species ===
G. aspleniifolia closely resembles its relative, G. longifolia but differs in that its branchlets are rounded and covered in short, grey wooly hairs, whereas the branchlets of G. longifolia are ruddy brown and covered in brownish, appressed hairs. G. aspleniifolia is also distinguishable from G. longifolia by its leaves, the former having greyish, wooly hairs on the underside of leaves that may be entire or irregularly toothed, the latter having greyish to brownish appressed hairs on the underside of the leaves. Both species may have entire leaves, though these are usually more numerous on G. aspleniifolia.

== Taxonomy ==
Grevillea aspleniifolia was first formally described in 1809 by Joseph Knight in On the cultivation of the plants belonging to the natural order of Proteeae. The specific epithet (aspleniifolia) means ''Asplenium-leaved".

== Distribution and habitat ==
This grevillea grows in woodland on sandstone or shale in the catchments of the Warragamba Dam and Woronora River, and near Bungonia Caves, in eastern New South Wales.

== Use in horticulture ==
Grevillea aspleniifolia is reported to be a hardy, fast-growing plant that tolerates heavy soil as long as the soil is well-drained. A sunny position is preferred.

== Conservation status ==
This species is listed as near threatened on the IUCN Red List of Threatened Species. It has a restricted distribution and a naturally severely fragmented population, where it occurs in several small, isolated subpopulations. Threats to this species include damage and/or grazing by introduced deer and changed fire regimes.
