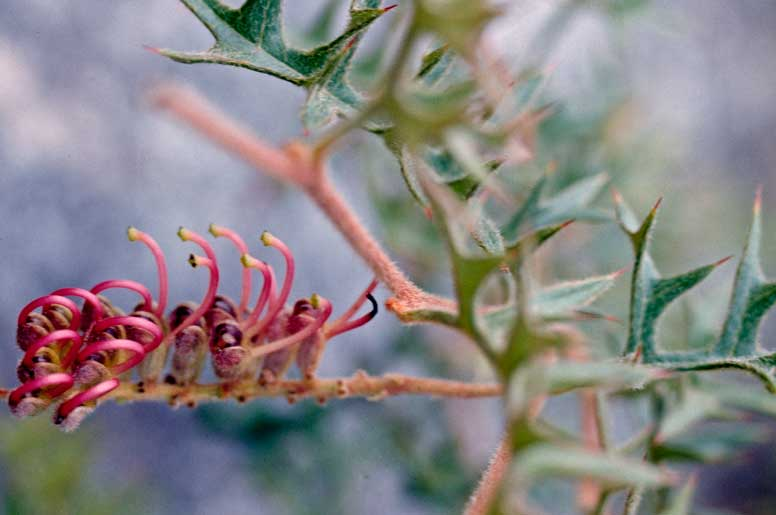
- in the Grampians

Scientific classification
- Kingdom: Plantae
- Clade: Tracheophytes
- Clade: Angiosperms
- Clade: Eudicots
- Order: Proteales
- Family: Proteaceae
- Genus: Grevillea
- Species: G. microstegia

Binomial name
- Grevillea microstegia Molyneux

= Grevillea microstegia =

Mount Cassell grevillea

Species of shrub endemic to Victoria, Australia

Grevillea microstegia, commonly known as Mount Cassell grevillea, is a species of flowering plant in the family Proteaceae and is endemic to Victoria in Australia. It is a prostrate to low-lying or straggling shrub with deeply divided leaves, the end lobes triangular, and toothbrush-shaped clusters of reddish-brown flowers with a red style.

== Description ==
Grevillea microstegia is a prostrate to low-lying or straggling shrub that typically grows to 0.3–1 m (1 ft 0 in – 3 ft 3 in) high 2–4 m (6 ft 7 in – 13 ft 1 in) wide. Its leaves are 20–60 mm (0.79–2.36 in) long and 15–50 mm (0.59–1.97 in) wide and oblong in outline, but deeply pinnatisect with five to 13 lobes, each sometimes further divided. The end lobes of the leaves are more or less triangular, 2–25 mm (0.079–0.984 in) long and 0.5–2 mm (0.020–0.079 in) wide. The end lobes or teeth are usually sharply pointed and the edges of the leaves curve downwards. The flowers are arranged in toothbrush-like clusters on a rachis 35–50 mm (1.4–2.0 in) long and are reddish-brown with a glabrous red style, the pistil 13.5–15.5 mm (0.53–0.61 in) long. Flowering occurs from November to December and the fruit is a silky-hairy follicle 9.5–11.5 mm (0.37–0.45 in) long.

== Taxonomy ==
Grevillea microstegia was first formally described in 1975 by Bill Molyneux in the journal Muelleria from specimens collected in 1970 on Mount Cassell in the central eastern ranges of the Grampians National Park. The specific epithet (microstegia) refers to the small floral bracts.

== Distribution and habitat ==
Mount Cassell grevillea grows on sandy or rocky soil in forest and scrub in the William Range area of the Grampians National Park.

== Conservation status ==
This species is listed as threatened in Victoria under the Flora and Fauna Guarantee Act 1988 and vulnerable in Victoria on the Department of Sustainability and Environment's Advisory List of Rare Or Threatened Plants In Victoria.
