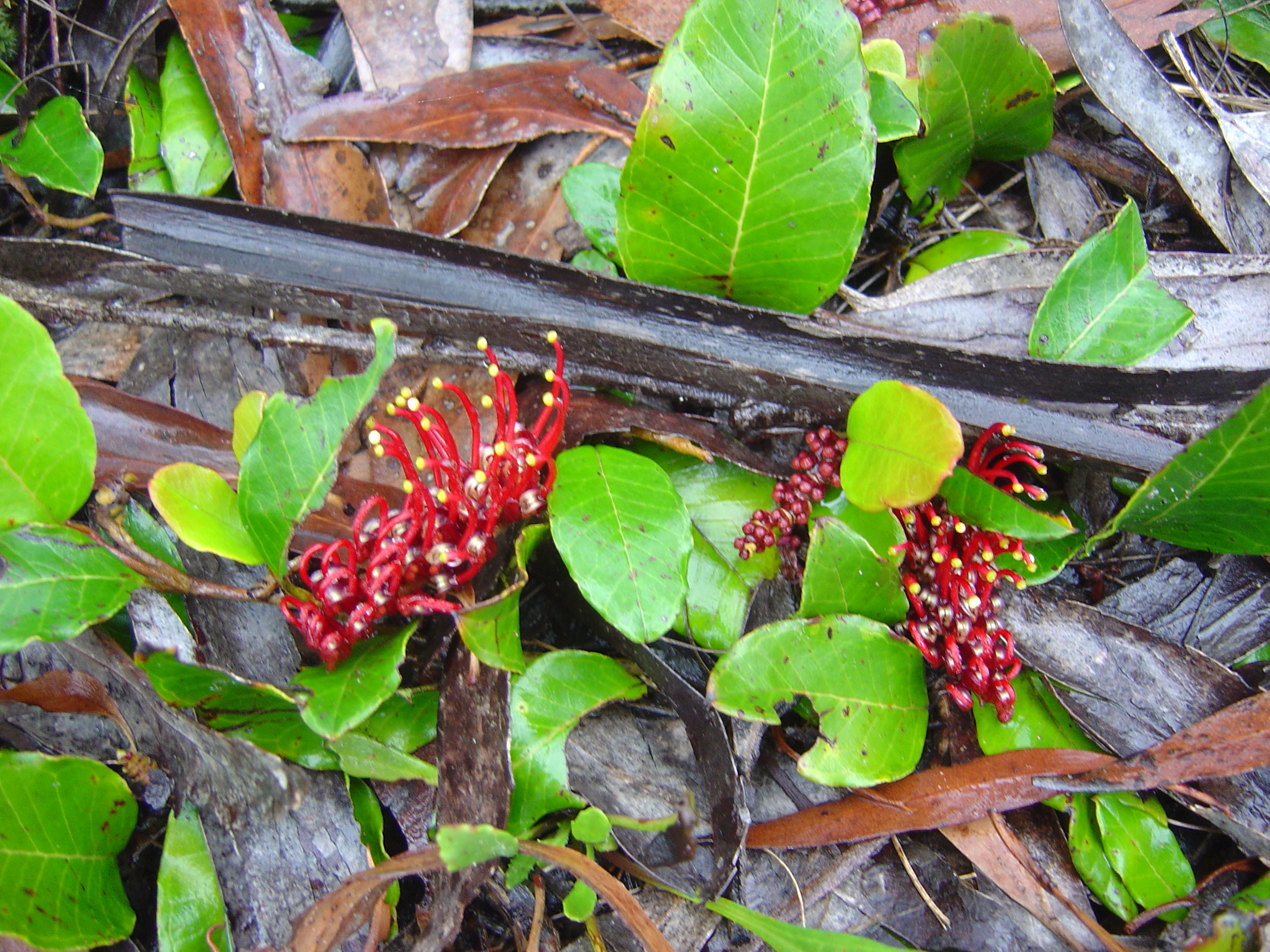

Conservation status
- Least Concern (IUCN 3.1)

Scientific classification
- Kingdom: Plantae
- Clade: Embryophytes
- Clade: Tracheophytes
- Clade: Angiosperms
- Clade: Eudicots
- Order: Proteales
- Family: Proteaceae
- Genus: Grevillea
- Species: G. laurifolia

Binomial name
- Grevillea laurifolia Sieber ex Spreng.

= Grevillea laurifolia =

Species of shrub endemic to eastern Australia

Grevillea laurifolia, commonly known as laurel-leaf grevillea, is a species of flowering plant in the family Proteaceae and is endemic to New South Wales. It is a prostrate, trailing shrub with egg-shaped, heart-shaped or round leaves, and clusters of reddish to deep maroon flowers.

== Description ==
Grevillea laurifolia is a prostrate, trailing shrub that can attain a diameter of 4.5 m (15 ft). Its leaves are egg-shaped to elliptic, sometimes heart-shaped or round, 25–160 mm (0.98–6.30 in) long and 25–60 mm (0.98–2.36 in) wide on a petiole 6–28 mm (0.24–1.10 in) long. The leaves sometimes have wavy edges, and the lower surface is silky-hairy. The flowers are arranged on one side of a rachis 20–80 mm (0.79–3.15 in) long and are reddish to deep maroon, the style with a green to yellow tip, and the pistil 13–25 mm (0.51–0.98 in) long. Flowering mainly occurs from September to January with a peak in November, and the fruit is a woolly-hairy follicle 9.0–9.5 mm (0.35–0.37 in) long.

== Taxonomy ==
Grevillea laurifolia was first formally described in 1827 by Kurt Polycarp Joachim Sprengel in Systema Vegetabilium from an unpublished manuscript by Franz Sieber. The specific epithet (laurifolia) means having leaves similar to species of Laurus.

In 2015, Peter M. Olde described two subspecies of G. laurifolia in the journal Telopea, and the names are accepted by the Australian Plant Census:

- Grevillea laurifolia subsp. caleyana Olde has leaves with an average blade length to width ratio more than 2.2:1, the pistils 9.5–14 mm (0.37–0.55 in) long.
- Grevillea laurifolia Sieber ex Spreng. subsp. laurifolia has leaves with an average blade length to width ratio less than 2.2:1, the pistils 17–25 mm (0.67–0.98 in) long.

== Distribution and habitat ==
Subspecies laurifolia occurs in the Blue Mountains between Valley Heights and Wentworth Falls at altitudes between 250 and 835 m (820 and 2,740 ft). Subspecies caleyana is found mainly in the upper Blue Mountains between Wentworth Falls, Lithgow, Mount Werong, Wombeyan Caves and Mittagong between about 500 and 1,000 m (1,600 and 3,300 ft) above sea level. It grows in low-nutrient clay-, shale- and sand-based soils, either on ridges and slopes or in the vicinity of swampy areas. The habitat is open sclerophyll forest under such trees as silvertop ash (Eucalyptus sieberi), Sydney peppermint (E. piperita), broad-leaved peppermint (E. dives, brittle gum (E. mannifera, red stringybark (E. macrorhyncha), brown barrel (E. fastigata) and alongside shrubs such as Mirbelia platyloboides, dense phyllota (Phyllota squarrosa), mountain geebung (Persoonia chamaepitys), myrtle geebung (P. myrtilloides) and stiff-leaf wattle (Acacia obtusifolia), or in more open woodland or heath associated with Faulconbridge mallee ash (Eucalyptus burgessiana), Blue Mountains mallee ash (E. stricta), scribbly gum (E. sclerophylla), and silver banksia (Banksia marginata).

== Use in horticulture ==
Grevillea laurifolia adapts readily to cultivation provided it has good drainage and a sunny aspect. It can have difficulties at lower altitudes. Larger-leaved forms have been selected for horticulture and make attractive groundcover plants and can attract birds to the garden. Grevillea 'Poorinda Royal Mantle' is a vigorous cultivar that was bred by Victorian plantsman Leo Hodge and registered in 1978; it is thought to be a hybrid between G. laurifolia and G. willisii. The most commonly cultivated subspecies is subsp. caleyana, because of its larger flowers.
