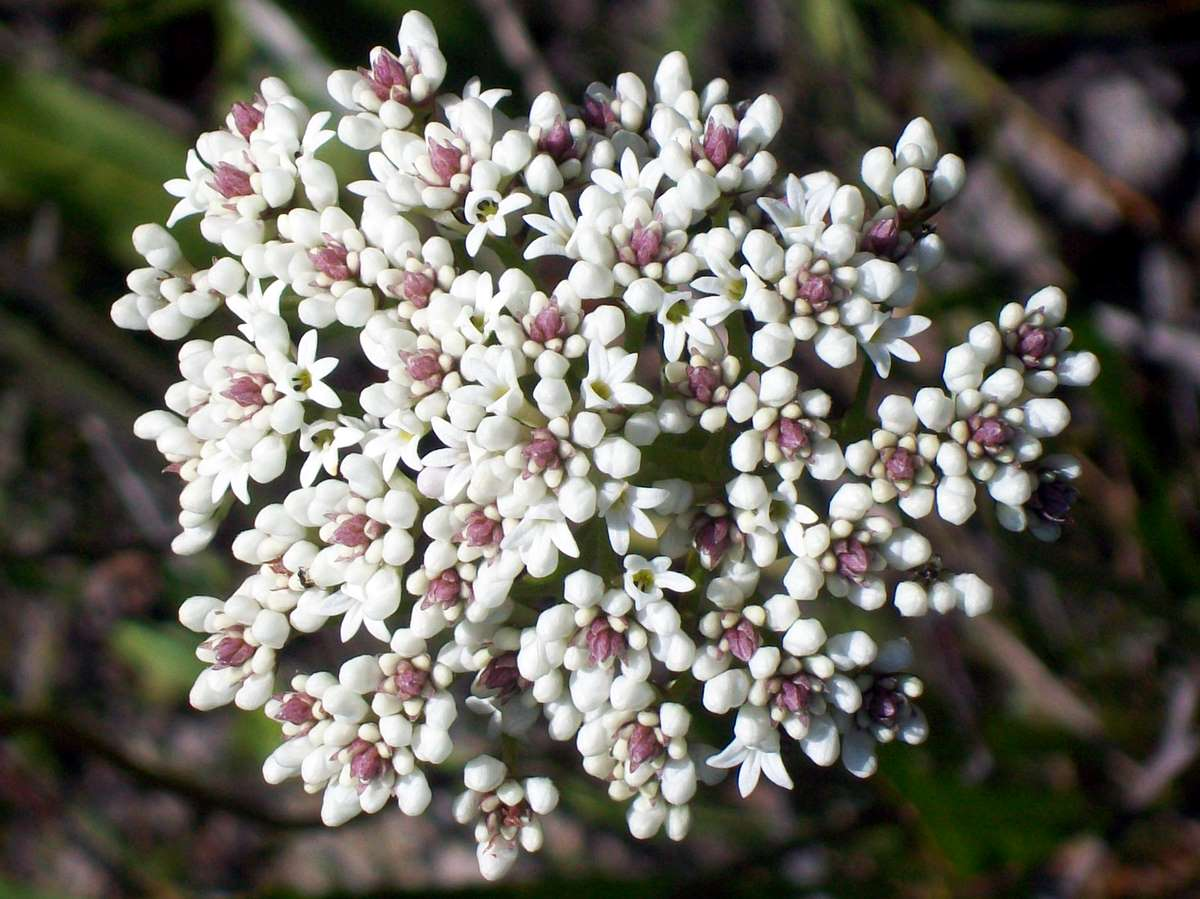
- In Ku-ring-gai Chase National Park

Scientific classification
- Kingdom: Plantae
- Clade: Tracheophytes
- Clade: Angiosperms
- Clade: Eudicots
- Order: Proteales
- Family: Proteaceae
- Genus: Conospermum
- Species: C. longifolium

Binomial name
- Conospermum longifolium Sm.

Synonyms
- Conospermum longifolium var. intermedium Meisn. nom. illeg., nom. superfl.; Conospermum scolopendrinum Gand.; Conospermum smithii Pers. nom. inval.

= Conospermum longifolium =

Long leaf smokebush

Species of Australian shrub

Conospermum longifolium, commonly known as the long leaf smokebush, is a species of flowering plant of the family Proteaceae and is endemic to New South Wales. It is a dense shrub or undershrub with linear to narrowly lance-shaped leaves, panicles of white flowers and velvety, cream-coloured to dark brown nuts.

== Description ==
Conospermum longifolium is a dense shrub or undershrub that typically grows to a height of up to 2.5 m (8 ft 2 in) and is covered with fine hairs. The leaves are linear to narrowly lance-shaped with the narrower end towards the base, 35–190 mm (1.4–7.5 in) long and 1–27 mm (0.039–1.063 in) wide, glabrous and sessile. The flowers are arranged in panicles of up to 4 flowers on a peduncle 100–250 mm (3.9–9.8 in) long with glabrous, egg-shaped bracteoles 1.6–3.8 mm (0.063–0.150 in) long and 1.0–2.5 mm (0.039–0.098 in) wide. The perianth is white, forming a tube 1.7–6 mm (0.067–0.236 in) long. The upper lip is egg-shaped, 1.5–3.5 mm (0.059–0.138 in) long and 1.8–2.5 mm (0.071–0.098 in) wide, the lower lip joined for 1.2–2.5 mm (0.047–0.098 in) with elliptic lobes 1.5–2.6 mm (0.059–0.102 in) long and 0.8–1 mm (0.031–0.039 in) wide. Flowering occurs in spring, and the fruit is a hairy cream-coloured to dark brown nut 2–3 mm (0.079–0.118 in) long with golden hairs.

== Taxonomy ==
Conospermum longifolium was first formally described in 1806 by James Edward Smith in his book, Exotic Botany, from a specimen collected from Port Jackson. The specific epithet (longifolium) means 'long-flowered'.

In 1975, Lawrie Johnson and Donald McGillivray described 3 subspecies of C. longifolium in the journal Telopea, and the names are accepted by the Australian Plant Census:

- Conospermum longifolium subsp. angustifolium (Meisn.) Lawrie Johnson & McGill. has linear to narrowly egg-shaped leaves less than 4 mm (0.16 in) wide.
- Conospermum longifolium Sm. subsp. longifolium has spatula-shaped to narrowly egg-shaped leaves more than 8 mm (0.31 in) wide.
- Conospermum longifolium subsp. mediale L.A.S.Johnson & McGill. has linear to narrowly egg-shaped leaves more than 4 mm (0.16 in) wide.

== Distribution and habitat ==
Long leaf smokebush grows in forest, woodland and heath on sandy soils on the coast and ranges of New South Wales between Newcastle, New South Wales and Ulladulla. Subspecies angustifolium is restricted to an area between Waterfall and Appin, subsp. longifolium mainly in coastal area between Port Jackson and Lake Conjola and subp. mediale mainly in the Blue Mountains between Putty and Moss Vale.
