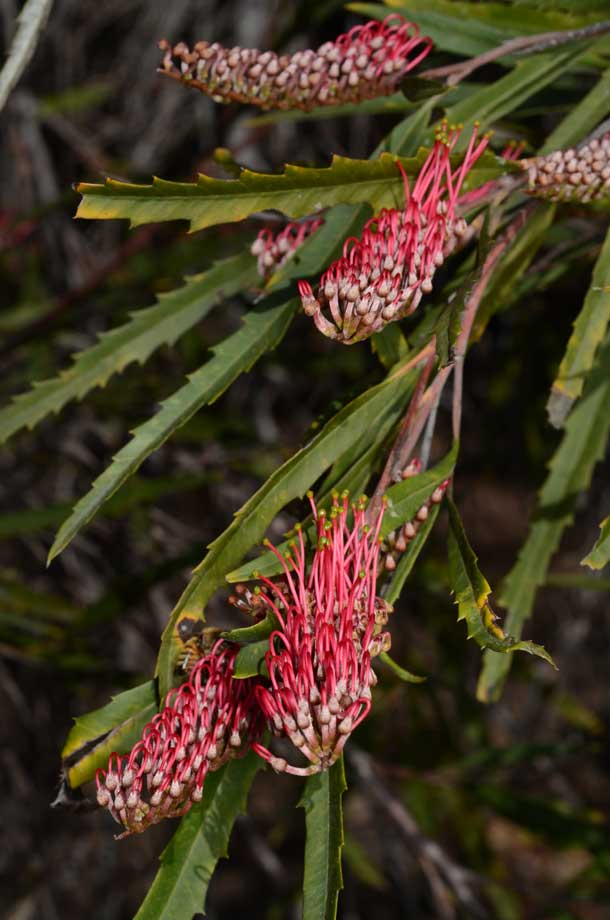
- In the Hunter Region Botanic Gardens

Conservation status
- Near Threatened (IUCN 3.1)

Scientific classification
- Kingdom: Plantae
- Clade: Embryophytes
- Clade: Tracheophytes
- Clade: Angiosperms
- Clade: Eudicots
- Order: Proteales
- Family: Proteaceae
- Genus: Grevillea
- Species: G. longifolia

Binomial name
- Grevillea longifolia R.Br.

Synonyms
- Grevillea aspleniifolia Knight p.p.; Grevillea aspleniifolia var. longifolia (R.Br.) Domin

= Grevillea longifolia =

Species of shrub endemic to Australia

Grevillea longifolia, commonly known as fern-leaf spider flower, is a species of flowering plant in the family Proteaceae and is endemic to the Sydney Basin in New South Wales. It is an erect to spreading shrub with narrowly egg-shaped to almost linear leaves, and toothbrush-like groups of pinkish-fawn flowers with a pink to red style. It is fairly readily grown in gardens.

== Description ==
Grevillea longifolia is an erect to spreading shrub that typically grows to a height of 1.5–6 m (4 ft 11 in – 19 ft 8 in). Its leaves are narrowly egg-shaped to narrowly elliptic or linear, 75–220 mm (3.0–8.7 in) long and 5–25 mm (0.20–0.98 in) wide, usually with coarsely toothed edges or sometimes pinnatifid. The lower surface of the leaves is covered with silky hairs and, when present, the teeth are 3–6 mm (0.12–0.24 in) long. The flowers are arranged in toothbrush-like groups on a rachis 45–75 mm (1.8–3.0 in) long and are pinkish-fawn with a pink to red style, the pistil 21–24 mm (0.83–0.94 in) long. Flowering occurs from July to January, peaking in September, and the fruit is a silky-hairy follicle 13–16 mm (0.51–0.63 in) long.

== Taxonomy ==
Grevillea longifolia was first formally described in 1830 by Robert Brown in his Supplementum primum Prodromi florae Novae Hollandiae, from specimens collected by George Caley near Port Jackson in July 1807. The specific epithet (longifolia) means "long-leaved".

== Distribution and habitat ==
Grevillea longifolia is restricted to the Sydney Basin, particularly the southern areas and Woronora Plateau. It is found in the Heathcote and Royal National Parks, but has vanished from the Burwood and Carlton districts where it once grew. It grows on Hawkesbury Sandstone and yellow clay soils, often along riverbanks and streams. It grows in shaded or part-shaded situations in woodland or forest, under such trees as blue leaved stringybark (Eucalyptus agglomerata), Sydney peppermint (E. piperita), stringybark (E. oblonga), smooth-barked apple (Angophora costata) and red bloodwood (Corymbia gummifera), and shrubs such as gymea lily (Doryanthes excelsa), and near creeks with such shrubs as Lomatia myricoides, watergum Tristania neriifolia, kanooka (Tristaniopsis laurina) and trees blackbutt (Eucalyptus pilularis) and coachwood (Ceratopetalum apetalum).

== Ecology ==
This grevillea is killed by fire, but regenerates from seed. The seed are sometimes eaten by insects, or by native mammals such as the bush rat (Rattus fuscipes) and swamp wallaby (Wallabia bicolor).

== Use in horticulture ==
Grevillea longifolia adapts readily to cultivation, and can be propagated vegetatively by cutting as plants have a tendency to hybridise, making seed parentage unclear. It is grown commercially in the south of France for its foliage. It is sometimes sold mistakenly labelled as G. aspleniifolia.
