= List of Grevillea species =

List of plant species in the genus Grevillea

This is a list of Grevillea species and subspecies accepted by Plants of the World Online as of June 2024:

Included in this list are the common and scientific names of the species, scientific names of the subspecies, the name of the country, state or territory where the species is distributed, the species' IUCN Red List status, other conservation statuses and an image of the species.

Other conservation statuses are at the regional level and include the Environment Protection and Biodiversity Conservation Act 1999 Act (EPBC) List of Threatened Flora of Australia, the Declared Rare and Priority Flora List (DEC) of Western Australia, the Biodiversity Conservation Act 2016 (BC) of New South Wales and the Flora and Fauna Guarantee Act 1988 Threatened List (FFG) of Victoria.

384 Grevillea species are endemic to Australia, with 241 of these being found in Western Australia and 132 in New South Wales. 10 species are endemic to New Caledonia and 4 species are endemic to Papua New Guinea. Only one species is endemic to Indonesia (G. elbertii)

== A-C ==
Common and scientific names	Subspecies	Distribution	IUCN status	Other statuses	Image
Grevillea acacioides C.A.Gardner ex McGill.		W.A.			
Acanthus-leaved grevillea Grevillea acanthifolia A.Cunn.	subsp. acanthifolia; subsp. paludosa A.Cunn.; subsp. stenomera (F.Muell. ex Benth.) McGill.	N.S.W.		Endangered (subsp. paludosa) (EPBC) (BC)	
Grevillea acerata McGill.		N.S.W.			
Grevillea acrobotrya Meisn.		W.A.			
Grevillea acropogon Makinson		W.A.		Endangered (EPBC) Threatened (Declared Rare Flora) – Extant Taxa (DEC)	
Grevillea acuaria F.Muell. ex Benth.		W.A.			
Grevillea adenotricha McGill.		W.A.		Priority Four — Rare Taxa (DEC)	
Blue grevillea Grevillea agrifolia A.Cunn. ex R.Br.	subsp. agrifolia; subsp. microcarpa (Olde & Marriott) Makinson	W.A, N.T.			
White spider flower Grevillea albiflora C.T.White		N.S.W, QLD, S.A, N.T.			
Alpine grevillea Grevillea alpina Lindl.		N.S.W, A.C.T, VIC.			
Buffalo grevillea Grevillea alpivaga Gand.		VIC.		Critically endangered (FFG)	
Split-leaved grevillea Grevillea althoferorum Olde & Marriott	subsp. althoferorum; subsp. fragilis Olde & Marriott	W.A.		Endangered (EPBC) Threatened (Declared Rare Flora) – Extant Taxa (both subsp.) (DEC)	
Grevillea amplexans F.Muell. ex Benth.	subsp. adpressa (Olde & Marriott) Makinson; subsp. amplexans; subsp. semivestita Makinson	W.A.		Priority One (subsp. adpressa) (DEC) Priority Two (subsp. semivestita) (DEC)	
Spiny cream spider flower Grevillea anethifolia R.Br.		W.A.			
Red Lake grevillea Grevillea aneura McGill.		W.A.		Priority Four — Rare Taxa (DEC)	
Grevillea angulata R.Br.		N.T.			
Dissected holly-leaf grevillea Grevillea angustiloba (F.Muell.) Downing	subsp. angustiloba; subsp. wirregaensis Downing	S.A, VIC.		Endangered (subsp. angustiloba) (FFG) Critically endangered ( subsp. wirregaensis) (FFG)	
Prickly plume grevillea Grevillea annulifera F.Muell.		W.A.		Priority Three – Poorly Known Taxa (DEC)	
Holly grevillea Grevillea aquifolium Lindl.		S.A, VIC.			
Sand grevillea Grevillea arenaria R.Br.	subsp. arenaria; subsp. canescens (R.Br.) Olde & Marriott	N.S.W.			
Silvery-leaved grevillea Grevillea argyrophylla Meisn.		W.A.			
Prickly toothbrushes Grevillea armigera Meisn.		W.A.			
Grevillea asparagoides Meisn.		W.A.		Priority Three — Poorly Known Taxa (DEC)	
Rough grevillea Grevillea aspera R.Br.		S.A, W.A.		Priority One — Poorly Known Taxa (DEC)	
Fern leaf grevillea Grevillea aspleniifolia Knight		N.S.W.			
Star-leaf grevillea Grevillea asteriscosa Diels		W.A.		Priority Four — Rare Taxa (DEC)	
Golden grevillea Grevillea aurea Olde & Marriott		N.T.			
Alpine grevillea Grevillea australis R.Br.		N.S.W, A.C.T, VIC, TAS.			
Banks' grevillea Grevillea banksii R.Br.		QLD.			
Banyabba grevillea Grevillea banyabba Olde & Marriott		N.S.W.		Vulnerable (EPBC) (BC)	
Gully grevillea Grevillea barklyana F.Muell. ex Benth.		VIC.		Critically endangered (FFG)	(Hybrid)
Mount Lesueur grevillea Grevillea batrachioides F.Muell. ex McGill.		W.A.		Endangered (EPBC) Threatened (Declared Rare Flora) – Extant Taxa (DEC)	
Bauer's grevillea Grevillea baueri R.Br.	subsp. asperula McGill.; subsp. baueri	N.S.W.			
Cape Arid grevillea Grevillea baxteri R.Br.		W.A.		Priority Four — Rare Taxa (DEC)	
Beadle's grevillea Grevillea beadleana McGill.		N.S.W.		Endangered (EPBC) (BC)	
Red combs Grevillea beardiana McGill.		W.A.			
Enfield grevillea Grevillea bedggoodiana J.H.Willis ex McGill.		VIC.		Vulnerable (EPBC) Endangered (FFG)	
Grevillea bemboka Stajsic & Molyneux		N.S.W.			
Grevillea benthamiana McGill.		N.T.			
Grevillea berryana Ewart & Jean White		W.A.			
Grevillea biformis Meisn.	subsp. biformis; subsp. cymbiformis Olde & Marriott	W.A.		Priority Two – Poorly Known Taxa (subsp. cymbiformis) (DEC)	
Fuchsia grevillea Grevillea bipinnatifida R.Br.	subsp. bipinnatifida; subsp. pagna Cranfield	W.A.		Priority One – Poorly Known Taxa (subsp. pagna) (DEC)	
Grevillea biternata Meisn.		W.A.			
Grevillea brachystachya Meisn.		W.A.			
Short-styled grevillea Grevillea brachystylis Meisn.	subsp. australis Keighery; subsp. brachystylis; subsp. grandis Keighery	W.A.		Critically endangered (subsp. grandis) (EPBC) Vulnerable (subsp. australis) (EPBC) Threatened (Declared Rare Flora) – Extant Taxa (Subsp. australis) (DEC) Priority Three (DEC) (subsp. brachystylis)	
Bracted grevillea Grevillea bracteosa Meisn.	subsp. bracteosa; subsp. howatharra Olde & Marriott	W.A.		Critically endangered (subsp. howatharra) (EPBC) Threatened (Declared Rare Flora) – Extant Taxa (both subsp.) (DEC)	
Cobberas grevillea Grevillea brevifolia F.Muell. ex Benth.		N.S.W, VIC.		Endangered (FFG)	
Grevillea brevis Olde & Marriott		N.T.			
Grevillea bronweniae Keighery		W.A.		Priority Two — Poorly Known Taxa (DEC)	
Burrowa grevillea Grevillea burrowa Molyneux & Forrester		VIC.		Critically endangered (FFG) (EPBC)	
Grey spider flower Grevillea buxifolia (Sm.) R.Br.	subsp. buxifolia; subsp. ecorniculata Olde & Marriott	N.S.W.			
Grevillea byrnesii McGill.		W.A, N.T.			
Red toothbrushes Grevillea cagiana McGill.		W.A.			
Grevillea calcicola A.S.George		W.A.		Priority Three — Poorly Known Taxa (DEC)	
Caley's Grevillea Grevillea caleyi R.Br.		N.S.W.		Critically endangered (EPBC) (BC)	
Foote's grevillea Grevillea calliantha Makinson & Olde		W.A.		Endangered (EPBC) Threatened (Declared Rare Flora) – Extant Taxa (DEC)	
Mt. Benambra grevillea Grevillea callichlaena Molyneux & Stajsic		VIC.		Critically endangered (FFG)	
Grevillea candelabroides C.A.Gardner		W.A.			
Grevillea candicans C.A.Gardner		W.A.		Priority Three — Poorly Known Taxa (DEC)	
Toodyay grevillea Grevillea candolleana Meisn.		W.A.		Priority Two — Poorly Known Taxa (DEC)	
Grevillea capitellata Meisn.		N.S.W.			
Nowa Nowa grevillea, Colquhoun grevillea Grevillea celata Molyneux		VIC.		Vulnerable (EPBC) Critically endangered (FFG)	
Grevillea centristigma (McGill.) Keighery		W.A.			
Grevillea ceratocarpa Diels		W.A.			
Grevillea cheilocarpa Makinson		W.A.			
Christine's grevillea Grevillea christineae McGill.		W.A.		Endangered (EPBC) Threatened (Declared Rare Flora) – Extant Taxa (DEC)	
Golden grevillea Grevillea chrysophaea F.Muell. ex Meisn		VIC.		Vulnerable (FFG)	
Varied-leaf grevillea Grevillea cirsiifolia Meisn.		W.A.			
Grevillea coccinea Meisn.	subsp. coccinea; subsp. lanata Olde & Marriott	W.A.		Priority Three — Poorly Known Taxa (DEC) (Subsp. lanata)	
Grevillea commutata F.Muell.	subsp. pinnatisecta Makinson; subsp. commutata	W.A.			
Red combs, elegant grevillea Grevillea concinna R.Br.	subsp. concinna; subsp. lemanniana (Meisn.) McGill.	W.A.			
Grampians grevillea, dense-leaf grevillea Grevillea confertifolia F.Muell.		VIC.		Endangered (FFG)	
Grevillea corrugata Olde & Marriott		W.A.		Endangered (EPBC) Priority One – Poorly Known Taxa (DEC)	
Grevillea costata A.S.George		W.A.		Priority Three — Poorly Known Taxa (DEC)	
Grevillea crassifolia Domin		W.A.			
Grevillea cravenii Makinson		W.A.		Priority Two — Poorly Known Taxa (DEC)	
Grevillea crithmifolia R.Br.		W.A.			
Grevillea crowleyae Olde & Marriott		W.A.		Priority Two — Poorly Known Taxa (DEC)	
Grevillea cunninghamii R.Br.		W.A.			
Grevillea curviloba McGill.	McGill. subsp. curviloba; subsp. incurva Olde & Marriott	W.A.		Endangered (Both subsp.) (EPBC) Threatened (Declared Rare Flora) – Extant Taxa (both subsp.) (DEC)	
Carnarvon grevillea, green grevillea Grevillea cyranostigma McGill.		QLD.			

== D-F ==
Common and scientific names	Subspecies	Distribution	IUCN status	Other statuses	Image
Grevillea decipiens McGill.		W.A			
Grevillea decora Domin	subsp. decora; subsp. telfordii Makinson	QLD			
Clothes-peg tree Grevillea decurrens Ewart		W.A, N.T			
Grevillea deflexa F.Muell.		W.A			
Grevillea delta (McGill.) Olde & Marriott		W.A		Priority Two — Poorly Known Taxa (DEC)	
Grevillea depauperata R.Br.		W.A			
Grevillea deplanchei Brongn. & Gris		New Caledonia			
Grevillea didymobotrya Meisn.	subsp. didymobotrya; subsp. involuta McGill.	W.A			
Grevillea dielsiana C.A.Gardner		W.A			
Grevillea diffusa Sieber ex Spreng.	subsp. constablei Makinson; subsp. diffusa; subsp. filipendula McGill.	N.S.W			
Grevillea dilatata (R.Br.) Downing		S.A			
Caustic bush, willings tree Grevillea dimidiata F.Muell.		W.A			
Grevillea diminuta L.A.S.Johnson		A.C.T, N.S.W			
Flame grevillea, olive grevillea Grevillea dimorpha F.Muell.		VIC		Endangered (FFG)	
Grevillea disjuncta F.Muell.		W.A			
Grevillea divaricata R.Br.		N.S.W	(possibly extinct)	Endangered (BC)	
Variable-leaved grevillea Grevillea diversifolia Meisn	subsp. diversifolia; subsp. subtersericata McGill.	W.A			
Grevillea dolichopoda (McGill.) Olde & Marriott		W.A			
Grevillea donaldiana Kenneally		W.A		Priority Two — Poorly Known Taxa (DEC)	
Drummond's grevillea Grevillea drummondii Meisn.		W.A		Priority Four — Rare Taxa (DEC)	
Grevillea dryandri R.Br.	subsp. dasycarpa McGill.; subsp. dryandri	W.A, N.T, QLD			
Phalanx grevillea Grevillea dryandroides C.A.Gardner	subsp. dryandroides; subsp. hirsuta Olde & Marriott	W.A		Endangered (Both subsp.) (EPBC) Threatened (Declared Rare Flora) – Extant Taxa (both subsp.) (DEC)	
Goldfields grevillea Grevillea dryophylla N.A.Wakef.		VIC		Endangered (FFG)	
Grevillea dunlopii Makinson		N.T			
White oak Grevillea edelfeltii F.Muell.		QLD, Papua New Guinea			
Grevillea elbertii Sleumer		Indonesia			
Ironstone grevillea Grevillea elongata Olde & Marriott		W.A		Vulnerable (EPBC) Threatened (Declared Rare Flora) – Extant Taxa (DEC)	
Spindly grevillea Grevillea endlicheriana Meisn.		W.A		Threatened (Declared Rare Flora) – Extant Taxa (subsp. Wongan Hills) (DEC)	
Grevillea epicroca Stajsic & Molyneux		N.S.W			
Grevillea erectiloba F.Muell.		W.A		Priority Four — Rare Taxa (DEC)	
Grevillea eremophila (Diels) Olde & Marriott		W.A			
Grevillea erinacea Meisn.		W.A		Priority Three — Poorly Known Taxa (DEC)	
Woolly cluster grevillea Grevillea eriobotrya F.Muell.		W.A		Priority Three — Poorly Known Taxa (DEC)	
Flame grevillea, orange grevillea, honey grevillea Grevillea eriostachya Lindl		W.A, S.A, N.T			
Curly grevillea Grevillea eryngioides Benth.		W.A			
Needle-leaf grevillea Grevillea erythroclada W.Fitzg		W.A, N.T, QLD			
Grevillea evanescens Olde & Marriott		W.A		Priority One — Poorly Known Taxa (DEC)	
Evans grevillea Grevillea evansiana MacKee		N.S.W		Vulnerable (EPBC) (BC)	
Flame grevillea Grevillea excelsior Diels		W.A			
Grevillea exposita Olde & Marriott		W.A			
Grevillea extorris S.Moore		W.A			
Grevillea exul Lindley		New Caledonia			
Grevillea fasciculata R.Br.		W.A			
Grevillea fastigiata Olde & Marriot		W.A		Priority Three — Rare Taxa (DEC)	
Grevillea fililoba (McGill.) Olde & Marriot		W.A		Priority One — Poorly Known Taxa (DEC)	
Grevillea fistulosa A.S.George		W.A		Priority Four – Rare Taxa (DEC)	
Zigzag grevillea, tangled grevillea Grevillea flexuosa (Lindl.) Meisn		W.A		Vulnerable (EPBC) Threatened (Declared Rare Flora) – Extant Taxa (DEC)	
Seven dwarfs grevillea Grevillea floribunda R.Br.	subsp. floribunda; subsp. tenella Olde & Marriott	N.S.W, QLD			
Grevillea florida (McGill.) Makinson		W.A		Priority Three — Poorly Known Taxa (DEC)	
Ben Major grevillea, drooping grevillea Grevillea floripendula R.V.Sm.		VIC		Vulnerable (EPBC) Critically endangered (FFG)	
Mount Brockman grevillea Grevillea formosa McGill.		N.T			
Grevillea fulgens C.A.Gardner		W.A		Priority Three — Poorly Known Taxa (DEC)	
Grevillea fuscolutea Keighery		W.A		Priority Four – Rare Taxa (DEC)	

== G-I ==
Common and scientific names	Subspecies	Distribution	IUCN status	Other statuses	Image
Grevillea gariwerdensis Makinson		VIC			
Grevillea × gaudichaudii R.Br. ex Gaudich.		N.S.W			
Grevillea georgeana McGill.		W.A		Priority Three — Poorly Known Taxa (DEC)	
Grevillea gillivrayi Hook. & Arn.		New Caledonia			
Grevillea glabrescens Olde & Marriott		N.T			
Bushman's clothes-peg Grevillea glauca Banks & Sol. ex Knight		Q.L.D, Papua New Guinea			
Grevillea globosa C.A.Gardner		W.A		Priority Three — Poorly Known Taxa (DEC)	
Grevillea glossadenia McGill.		QLD		Vulnerable (EPBC)	
Grevillea goodii R.Br.		N.T			
Grevillea gordoniana C.A.Gardner		W.A			
Grevillea granulifera (McGill.) Olde & Marriott		N.S.W			
Grevillea granulosa McGill.		W.A		Priority Three — Poorly Known Taxa (DEC)	
Grevillea guthrieana Olde & Marriott		N.S.W		Endangered (EPBC) (BC)	
Grevillea hakeoides Meisn	subsp. hakeoides; subsp. stenophylla (W.Fitzg.) McGill.	W.A			
Grevillea halmaturina Tate	subsp. halmaturina; subsp. laevis Makinson	S.A			
Grevillea haplantha F.Muell. ex Benth	subsp. haplantha; subsp. recedens Olde & Marriott	W.A		Priority Three — Poorly Known Taxa (subsp. recedens) (DEC)	Subsp. haplantha
Rock grevillea Grevillea heliosperma R.Br.		W.A, N.T, QLD			
Grevillea helmsiae F.M.Bailey		QLD			
White silky oak, white yiel yiel, Hill's sikly oak, grey oak Grevillea hilliana F.Muell.		QLD, N.S.W		Endangered (BC)	
Grevillea hirtella (Benth.) Olde & Marriott		W.A		Priority Three — Poorly Known Taxa (DEC)	
Grevillea hislopii Olde & Marriott		W.A			
Grevillea hockingsii Molyneux & Olde		QLD			
Coochin Hills Grevillea Grevillea hodgei Olde & Marriott		QLD		Critically endangered (EPBC)	
Red toothrbrushes, Hooker's grevillea Grevillea hookeriana Meisn.	subsp. apiciloba (F.Muell.) Makinson; subsp. digitata (F.Muell.) Makinson; subsp. hookeriana	W.A			
Grevillea hortiorum Olde		W.A			
Comb spider flower, comb grevillea Grevillea huegelii Meisn.		W.A, S.A, VIC, N.S.W			
Spreading grevillea Grevillea humifusa Olde & Marriott		W.A		Endangered (EPBC) Priority Four – Rare Taxa (DEC)	
Grevillea humilis Makinson	subsp. humilis; subsp. lucens Makinson; subsp. maritima Makinson	QLD, N.S.W			Subsp. lucens
Porcupine grevillea Grevillea hystrix R.W.Davis		W.A			
Wee Jasper Grevillea Grevillea iaspicula McGill.		N.S.W		Endangered (EPBC)Critically endangered (BC)	
Holly grevillea, holly bush Grevillea ilicifolia (R.Br.) R.Br	subsp. ilicifolia; subsp. lobata (F.Muell.) Downing	S.A, VIC, N.S.W		Critically endangered (subsp. ilicifolia) (BC)	
Grevillea imberbis Makinson		N.S.W			
Cue grevillea Grevillea inconspicua Diels		W.A		Priority Four — Rare Taxa (DEC)	
Grevillea incrassata Diels		W.A			
Grevillea incurva (Diels) Olde & Marriott		W.A			
Anglesea grevillea Grevillea infecunda McGill		VIC.		Vulnerable (EPBC) Endangered (FFG)	
Fan-leaf grevillea Grevillea infundibularis A.S.George		W.A		Endangered (EPBC) Threatened (Declared Rare Flora) – Extant Taxa (DEC)	
Wax grevillea Grevillea insignis Kippist ex Meisn.	subsp. elliotii Olde & Marriott.; subsp. insignis	W.A		Priority Three – Poorly Known Taxa (subsp. elliotii) (DEC)	Subsp. insignis
Entire-leaved grevillea Grevillea integrifolia (Endl.) Meisn.		W.A			
Grevillea intricata Meisn.		W.A			
Lake Varley Grevillea Grevillea involucrata A.S.George		W.A		Endangered (EPBC) Threatened (Declared Rare Flora) – Extant Taxa (DEC)	
Grevillea irrasa Makinson	subsp. didymochiton Makinson; subsp. irrasa Makinson	N.S.W			Subsp. didymochiton

== J-L ==
Common and scientific names	Subspecies	Distribution	IUCN status	Other statuses	Image
Grevillea jephcottii J.H.Willis		VIC.		Endangered (EPBC) (FFG)	
Grevillea johnsonii McGill.		N.S.W			
Grevillea juncifolia R.Br.	subsp. juncifolia; subsp. temulenta Olde & Marriott	W.A, N.T, S.A. QLD, N.S.W			
Grevillea juniperina Hook.	subsp. allojohnsonii Makinson; subsp. amphitricha Makinson; subsp. fortis Makinson; subsp. juniperina; subsp. sulphurea (A.Cunn.) Makinson; subsp. trinervis (R.Br.) Makinson; subsp. villosa Makinson	N.S.W, QLD.		Vulnerable (subsp. juniperina) (BC)	
Grevillea kedumbensis (McGill.) Olde & Marriott		N.S.W			
Grevillea kenneallyi McGill.		W.A		Priority Two — Poorly Known Taxa (DEC)	
Grevillea kennedyana F.Muell.		N.S.W, QLD.		Vulnerable (EPBC) (BC)	
Grevillea kirkalocka Olde & Marriott		W.A		Priority One — Poorly Known Taxa (DEC)	
Grevillea lanigera A.Cunn. ex R.Br.					
Grevillea latifolia C.A.Gardner		W.A		Priority Two – Poorly Known Taxa (DEC)	
Grevillea laurifolia Sieber ex Spreng.	subsp. caleyana Olde; subsp. laurifolia	N.S.W.			
Grevillea lavandulacea Schltdl.	subsp. lavandulacea; subsp. rogersii (Maiden) Makinson	S.A, VIC.			
Grevillea lawrenceana Bosse	subsp. lawrenceana	W.A			
Grevillea leiophylla F.Muell. ex Benth.		QLD.			
Grevillea leptobotrys Meisn.		W.A			
Grevillea leptopoda McGill.		W.A		Priority Three – Poorly Known Taxa (DEC)	
Grevillea leucoclada McGill.		W.A			
Grevillea leucopteris Meisn		W.A			
Grevillea levis Olde & Marriott		W.A			
Grevillea linearifolia (Cav.) Druce		N.S.W.			
Grevillea linsmithii McGill.		N.S.W, QLD.			
Grevillea lissopleura McGill.		W.A		Priority One — Poorly Known Taxa (DEC)	
Grevillea longicuspis McGill.		N.T.			
Grevillea longifolia R.Br.		N.S.W.			
Grevillea longistyla Hook.		QLD.			
Grevillea lullfitzii McGill.		W.A		Priority One – Poorly Known Taxa (DEC)	

== M-O ==
Common and scientific names	Subspecies	Distribution	IUCN status	Other statuses	Image
Grevillea maccutcheonii Keighery & Cranfield		W.A		Endangered (EPBC) Threatened (Declared Rare Flora) – Extant Taxa (DEC)	
Grevillea macleayana (McGill.) Olde & Marriott		N.S.W.			
Grevillea macmillanii Guillaumin		New Caledonia			
Grevillea maherae Makinson & M.D.Barrett		W.A.			
Grevillea makinsonii McGill.		W.A.		Priority Three – Poorly Known Taxa (DEC)	
Grevillea manglesii Pépin	subsp. manglesii; subsp. ornithopoda (Meisn.) McGill.	W.A.		Priority Three – Poorly Known Taxa (subsp. dissectifolia) (DEC) Priority Two – Poorly Known Taxa (subsp. ornithopoda) (DEC)	
Grevillea manglesioides Meisn.	subsp. ferricola Keighery; subsp. manglesioides; subsp. metaxa Makinson.	W.A.		Priority Two – Poorly Known Taxa (subsp. ferricola) (DEC)	
Grevillea marriottii Olde		W.A.		Priority One — Poorly Known Taxa (DEC)	
Grevillea masonii Olde & Marriott		N.S.W.		Endangered (EPBC) (BC)	
Grevillea maxwellii McGill.		W.A.		Endangered (EPBC) Threatened (Declared Rare Flora) – Extant Taxa (DEC)	
Grevillea mcgillivrayi I.M.Turner		QLD.			
Grevillea meisneri Montrouz.	var. argyrophylla Guillaumin; var. meisneri	New Caledonia			
Grevillea merceri Olde & Marriott		W.A.			
Grevillea metamorpha Makinson		W.A.		Priority One — Poorly Known Taxa (DEC)	
Grevillea micrantha Meisn.		VIC.		Critically endangered (FFG)	
Grevillea microstegia Molyneux		VIC.		Critically endangered (FFG)	
Grevillea microstyla M.D.Barrett & Makinson		W.A.			
Grevillea milleriana Olde		N.S.W.			
Grevillea mimosoides R.Br.		W.A., N.T., QLD.			
Grevillea miniata W.Fitzg.		W.A.		Priority Four — Rare Taxa (DEC)	
Grevillea minutiflora McGill.		W.A.		Priority One — Poorly Known Taxa (DEC)	
Grevillea miqueliana F.Muell.	subsp. cincta Molyneux & Stajsic; subsp. miqueliana; subsp. moroka Molyneux & Stajsic	VIC.		Critically endangered (subsp. cincta) (FFG) Endangered (subsp. miqueliana and moroka) (FFG)	(Subsp. cincta)
Soft grevillea Grevillea mollis Olde & Molyneux		N.S.W.		Endangered (EPBC) (BC)	
Wingello grevillea Grevillea molyneuxii McGill.		N.S.W.		Endangered (EPBC)Vulnerable (BC)	
Grevillea mondorensis Majourau & Pillon		New Caledonia			
Lake Mountain grevillea Grevillea monslacana Molyneux & Stajsic		VIC.		Critically endangered (FFG)	
Grevillea montana R.Br		N.S.W.			
Grevillea monticola Meisn.		W.A.			
Mount Cole grevillea Grevillea montis-cole R.V.Sm.	R.V.Sm. subsp. brevistyla; subsp. montis-cole R.V.Sm.	VIC.		Critically endangered (both subsp.) (FFG) Vulnerable (subsp. brevistyla) (EPBC)	(Subsp. montis-cole)
Green spider flower Grevillea mucronulata R.Br.		N.S.W			
Grevillea muelleri Benth.		W.A.			
Grevillea murex McGill.		W.A.		Endangered (EPBC) Threatened (Declared Rare Flora) – Extant Taxa (DEC)	
Grevillea muricata J.M.Black		W.A.			
Grevillea myosodes McGill.		W.A., N.T.			
Grevillea nana C.A.Gardner	subsp. abbreviata McGill.; subsp. nana	W.A.		Priority Two – Poorly Known Taxa (subsp. abbreviata) (DEC)	
Grevillea nematophylla F.Muell.	Makinson subsp. nematophylla; subsp. planicosta Makinson; C.A.Gardner subsp. supraplana	W.A., N.T., S.A., N.S.W.			
Grevillea neodissecta I.M.Turner		W.A.		Priority Four — Rare Taxa (DEC)	
Grevillea neorigida I.M.Turner	subsp. distans (Olde & Marriott) I.M.Turner; subsp. neorigida	W.A.			
Grevillea nepwiensis Majourau & Pillon		New Caledonia			
Grevillea neurophylla Gand.	subsp. fluviatilis Makinson; subsp. neurophylla	N.S.W., VIC.		Endangered (Both subsp.) (FFG)	
Grevillea newbeyi McGill.		W.A.		Priority Three — Poorly Known Taxa (DEC)	
Grevillea nivea Olde & Marriott		W.A.			
Grevillea nudiflora Meisn.		W.A			
Grevillea obliquistigma C.A.Gardner	subsp. cullenii Olde & Marriott; subsp. funicularis Olde & Marriott; subsp. obliquistigma	W.A			
Fryerstown grevillea, Elphinstone grevillea, Taradale grevillea Grevillea obtecta Molyneux		VIC.		Endangered (FFG)	
Grevillea obtusiflora R.Br.	subsp. fecunda Makinson; subsp. obtusiflora	N.S.W.		Endangered (EPBC) (BC)	
Grevillea obtusifolia Meisn.		W.A.			
Grevillea occidentalis R.Br.		W.A.			
Grevillea oldei McGill.		N.S.W.			
Red spider flower Grevillea oleoides Sieber		N.S.W.			
Grevillea oligantha F.Muell.		W.A.			
Grevillea oligomera (McGill.) Olde & Marriott		W.A			
Grevillea olivacea A.S.George		W.A.		Priority Four — Rare Taxa (DEC)	
Grevillea oncogyne Diels		W.A.			
Grevillea oxyantha Makinson	subsp. ecarinata Makinson; subsp. oxyantha	N.S.W.			

== P-R ==
Common and scientific names	Subspecies	Distribution	IUCN status	Other statuses	Image
Grevillea pachylostyla (McGill.) Olde & Marriott		VIC.		Critically endangered (FFG)	
Grevillea paniculata Meisn.		W.A.			
Grevillea papillosa (McGill.) Olde & Marriott		W.A		Priority Three – Poorly Known Taxa (DEC)	
Grevillea papuana Diels		Papua New Guinea			
Grevillea paradoxa F.Muell.		W.A.			
Grevillea parallela Knight		W.A, N.T, QLD.			
Grevillea parallelinervis Carrick		S.A.			
Grevillea parviflora R.Br.	subsp. parviflora Makinson; subsp. supplicans	N.S.W.		Vulnerable (subsp. parviflora) (EPBC) (BC) Endangred (subsp. supplicans) (BC)	
Grevillea parvula Molyneux & Stajsic		N.S.W, VIC.		Endangered (FFG)	
Grevillea patentiloba F.Muell.	subsp. patentiloba; subsp. platypoda (F.Muell.) Olde & Marriott	W.A.			
Grevillea patulifolia Gand.		N.S.W, VIC.		Critically Endangered (FFG)	
Grevillea pauciflora R.Br.	subsp. leptophylla W.R.Barker; subsp. pauciflora; subsp. psilophylla McGill.; subsp. saxatilis McGill.	W.A, S.A.			
Grevillea pectinata R.Br.		W.A.			
Pink pokers, rock grevillea, poker grevillea Grevillea petrophiloides Meisn.	subsp. magnifica McGill.; subsp. petrophiloides McGill.; (Olde & Marriott) Makinson subsp. remota McGill.	W.A.			
Grevillea phanerophlebia Diels		W.A.		Threatened (Declared Rare Flora) – Extant Taxa (DEC)	
Grevillea phillipsiana McGill.		W.A.		Priority One — Poorly Known Taxa (DEC)	
Grevillea phylicoides R.Br.		N.S.W.			
Grevillea pieroniae Olde		W.A.			
Grevillea pilosa A.S.George	subsp. pilosa; subsp. redacta Olde & Marriott	W.A.		Priority Three – Poorly Known Taxa (subsp. redacta) (DEC)	(subsp. pilosa)
Grevillea pilulifera (Lindl.) Druce		W.A.			
Grevillea pimeleoides W.Fitzg.		W.A.		Priority Four — Rare Taxa (DEC)	
Grevillea pinaster Meisn.		W.A.			
Grevillea pinifolia Meisn.		W.A.		Priority One — Poorly Known Taxa (DEC)	
Grevillea pityophylla F.Muell.		W.A.			
Grevillea pluricaulis (McGill.) Olde & Marriott		N.T.			
Grevillea plurijuga F.Muell.	subsp. plurijuga; subsp. superba (Olde & Marriott) Makinson	W.A.			
Grevillea polyacida McGill.		N.T.			
Grevillea polybotrya Meisn.		W.A.			
Grevillea polybractea H.B.Will.		N.S.W, VIC.		Endangered (FFG)	
Grevillea polychroma (Molyneux & Stajsic) Molyneux & Stajsic		VIC.		Endangered (FFG)	
Grevillea prasina McGill.		W.A, N.T.			
Grevillea preissii Meisn.		W.A.			(subsp. preissii)
Grevillea prominens Olde & Marriott		W.A.		Priority Three – Poorly Known Taxa (DEC)	
Grevillea prostrata C.A.Gardner & A.S.George		W.A.		Priority Four – Rare Taxa (DEC)	
Grevillea psilantha McGill.		W.A.		Priority Two – Poorly Known Taxa (DEC)	
Grevillea pteridifolia Knight		W.A, N.T, QLD.			
Grevillea pterosperma F.Muell.		W.A, N.T, S.A, N.S.W, VIC.			
Grevillea pulchella (R.Br.) Meisn.	subsp. pulchella; subsp. ascendens Olde & Marriott	W.A.			
Grevillea punctata Olde & Marriott		W.A.			
Flame grevillea Grevillea pungens R.Br.		N.T.			
Grevillea punicea R.Br.		N.T			
Caustic bush Grevillea pyramidalis A.Cunn. ex R.Br.	subsp. leucadendron (A.Cunn. ex R.Br.) Makinson; subsp. longiloba (F.Muell.) Olde & Marriott; subsp. pyramidalis	W.A, N.T.			
Grevillea pythara Olde & Marriott		W.A.		Endangered (EPBC) Threatened (Declared Rare Flora) – Extant Taxa (DEC)	
Grevillea quadricauda Olde & Marriott		QLD, N.S.W.		Vulnerable (EPBC) (BC)	
Grevillea quercifolia R.Br.		W.A.			
Grevillea quinquenervis J.M.Black		S.A.			
Grevillea ramosissima Meisn.	subsp. hypargyrea (F.Muell.) Olde & Marriott; subsp. ramosissima	N.S.W, VIC.		Endangered (subsp. hypargyrea) (FFG)	
Rare grevillea Grevillea rara Olde & Marriott		W.A.		Endangered (EPBC) Threatened (Declared Rare Flora) – Extant Taxa (DEC)	
Grevillea raybrownii Olde & Marriott		N.S.W.		Vulnerable (EPBC) (BC)	
Silver-leaf grevillea Grevillea refracta R.Br.	subsp. glandulifera Olde & Marriott; subsp. refracta	W.A, N.T, QLD.			
Grevillea renwickiana F.Muell.		N.S.W.		Endangered (BC)	
Creeping grevillea Grevillea repens F.Muell. ex Meisn.		VIC.		Endangered (FFG)	
Tin Can Bay grevillea Grevillea reptans Makinson		QLD.			
Grevillea rhizomatosa Olde & Marriott		N.S.W.		Vulnerable (EPBC) (BC)	
Grevillea rhyolitica Makinson	subsp. rhyolitica; subsp. semivestita Makinson	N.S.W.			('Deua Flame' cultivar)
Grevillea ripicola A.S.George		W.A.		Priority Four – Rare Taxa (DEC)	
Carrington Falls grevillea Grevillea rivularis L.A.S.Johnson & McGill.		N.S.W.		Critically endangered (EPBC) (BC)	
Silky oak Grevillea robusta A.Cunn. ex R.Br.		QLD, N.S.W. (Introduced worldwide)			
Rogerson's grevillea Grevillea rogersoniana C.A.Gardner		W.A.		Priority Three – Poorly Known Taxa (DEC)	
Grevillea rosieri McGill.		W.A.		Priority Two – Poorly Known Taxa (DEC)	
Grevillea rosmarinifolia A.Cunn.	subsp. glabella (R.Br.) Makinson; subsp. rosmarinifolia	N.S.W, VIC.		Endangered (subsp. glabella) (FFG)	(subsp. glabella)
Grevillea roycei McGill.		W.A.		Priority Three – Poorly Known Taxa (DEC)	
Grevillea rubicunda S.Moore		N.T.			
Grevillea rubiginosa Brongn. & Gris		New Caledonia			
Grevillea rudis Meisn.		W.A.		Priority Four – Rare Taxa (DEC)	

== S-U ==
Common and scientific names	Subspecies	Distribution	IUCN status	Other statuses	Image
Pouched grevillea Grevillea saccata Benth.		W.A.		Priority Four – Rare Taxa (DEC)	
Wheel grevillea Grevillea sarissa S.Moore	subsp. anfractifolia McGill.; subsp. bicolor McGill.; subsp. rectitepala McGill.; subsp. sarissa; subsp. succincta McGill.; subsp. umbellifera (J.M.Black) McGill.	W.A, S.A.			(subsp. sarissa)
Grevillea saxicola S.J.Dillon		W.A.			
Rough-leaved grevillea Grevillea scabra Meisn.		W.A.			
Grevillea scabrida C.A.Gardner		W.A.		Priority Three – Poorly Known Taxa (DEC)	
Corrigin grevillea Grevillea scapigera A.S.George		W.A.		Endangered (EPBC) Threatened (Declared Rare Flora) – Extant Taxa (DEC)	
Black grevillea Grevillea scortechinii (F.Muell. ex Scort.) F.Muell.	subsp. sarmentosa (Blakely & McKie) McGill.; subsp. scortechinii	QLD, N.S.W.		Critically endangered (subsp. scortechinii) (EPBC) Vulnerable (subsp. sarmentosa) (BC)	(subsp. scortechinii)
Grevillea secunda McGill.		W.A.		Priority Two – Poorly Known Taxa (DEC)	
Pink spider flower Grevillea sericea (Sm.) R.Br.	subsp. riparia (R.Br.) Olde & Marriott; subsp. sericea	N.S.W			
Grevillea sessilis C.T.White & W.D.Francis		QLD.			
Grevillea shiressii Blakely		N.S.W.		Vulnerable (EPBC) (BC)	
Grevillea shuttleworthiana Meisn.	subsp. canarina Olde & Marriott; subsp. obovata (Benth.) Olde & Marriott; subsp. shuttleworthiana	W.A.			(subsp. canarina)
Grevillea singuliflora F.Muell.		QLD.			(Foliage)
Grevillea sinuata Brongn. & Gris		New Caledonia			
Grevillea sparsiflora F.Muell.		W.A.			
Red spider flower Grevillea speciosa (Knight) McGill.		N.S.W.			
Grevillea speckiana Olde		W.A.			
Grevillea sphacelata R.Br.		N.S.W.			
Grevillea spinosa McGill.		W.A.			
Grevillea spinosissima McGill.		W.A.			
Grevillea squiresiae Olde & Marriott		W.A.		Priority One – Poorly Known Taxa (DEC)	
Brisbane Ranges grevillea Grevillea steiglitziana N.A.Wakef.		VIC.		Endangered (FFG)	
Grevillea stenobotrya F.Muell.		W.A, N.T, S.A, QLD, N.S.W.			
Grevillea stenogyne (Benth.) Makinson		W.A.		Priority One – Poorly Known Taxa (DEC)	
Lace net grevillea Grevillea stenomera F.Muell.		W.A.		Priority Two – Poorly Known Taxa (DEC)	
Grevillea stenostachya C.A.Gardner		W.A.		Priority Three – Poorly Known Taxa (DEC)	
Beefwood, western beefwood, beef silky oak, silver honeysuckle Grevillea striata R.Br.		W.A, N.T, S.A, QLD, N.S.W.			(Habit)
Grevillea subterlineata Makinson		W.A.		Priority Three – Poorly Known Taxa (DEC)	
Grevillea subtiliflora McGill.		W.A.		Priority One – Poorly Known Taxa (DEC)	
Grevillea sulcata C.A.Gardner ex Olde & Marriott		W.A.		Priority One – Poorly Known Taxa (DEC)	
Grevillea synapheae R.Br.	subsp. latiloba (Meisn.) Makinson; subsp. minyulo Makinson; subsp. pachyphylla Olde & Marriott; subsp. synapheae	W.A.		Priority One – Poorly Known Taxa (subsp. minyulo) (DEC)	
Grevillea tenuiflora Meisn.		W.A.			
Grevillea tenuiloba C.A.Gardner		W.A.		Priority Three – Poorly Known Taxa (DEC)	
Grevillea teretifolia Meisn.		W.A.			
Grevillea tesselata Olde		W.A.			
Grevillea tetragonoloba Meisn.		W.A.			
Grevillea tetrapleura McGill.		W.A.		Priority Four – Rare Taxa (DEC)	
Grevillea thelemanniana Hügel ex Lindl.		W.A.		Critically endangered (EPBC) Priority Four – Rare Taxa (DEC)	
Grevillea thyrsoides Meisn.	subsp. pustulata Olde & Marriott; subsp. thyrsoides	W.A.		Priority Three – Poorly Known Taxa (both subsp.) (DEC)	
Grevillea trachytheca F.Muell.		W.A.			
Grevillea treueriana F.Muell.		S.A.		Vulnerable (EPBC)	
Grevillea trichantha Olde		W.A.			
Grevillea trifida (R.Br.) Meisn.		W.A.			
Grevillea triloba Meisn.		W.A.		Priority Three – Poorly Known Taxa (DEC)	
Grevillea tripartita Meisn.	subsp. macrostylis (F.Muell.) Makinson; subsp. tripartita	W.A.			(subsp. tripartita)
Grevillea triternata R.Br.		N.S.W.			
Grevillea umbellulata Meisn.		W.A.			
Grevillea uncinulata Diels		W.A.			
Grevillea uniformis (McGill.) Olde & Marriott		W.A		Priority Three – Poorly Known Taxa (DEC)	

== V-Z ==
Common and scientific names	Subspecies	Distribution	IUCN status	Other statuses	Image
Cape Range grevillea Grevillea variifolia C.A.Gardner & A.S.George		W.A.			
Grevillea velutinella McGill.		W.A.			
Byfield spider flower Grevillea venusta R.Br.		QLD.			
Grevillea versicolor McGill.		N.T.			
Grevillea vestita (Endl.) Meisn.	subsp. isopogoides McGill.; subsp. vestita	W.A.			
Royal grevillea, mountain grevillea Grevillea victoriae F.Muell.	subsp. brindabella Stajsic; subsp. nivalis Stajsic & Molyneux; subsp. victoriae	N.S.W, VIC.		Endangered (subsp. nilavis and victoriae) (FFG)	(subsp. victoriae)
Nerong grevillea Grevillea virgata Makinson		N.S.W.			
Linear-leaf grevillea Grevillea viridiflava Makinson		QLD, N.S.W.			
Grevillea vuniana Pillon		New Caledonia			
Mundubbera grevillea Grevillea whiteana McGill.		QLD.			
Wickham's grevillea Grevillea wickhamii Meisn.	subsp. aprica McGill.; subsp. cratista Makinson; subsp. hispidula Makinson; subsp. macrodonta Makinson; subsp. pallida Makinson; subsp. wickhamii	W.A, N.T, QLD.			(subsp. aprica)
Tumut grevillea Grevillea wilkinsonii Makinson		N.S.W.		Critically endangered (EPBC) (BC)	
Grevillea williamsoni F.Muell.		VIC.			
Omeo grevillea, Rock grevillea Grevillea willisii R.V.Sm. & McGill.		VIC.		Endangered (FFG)	
Wilson's Grevillea, Native fuchsia Grevillea wilsonii A.Cunn.		W.A.			
Grevillea wiradjuri Makinson		N.S.W.			
Grevillea wittweri McGill.		W.A.			
Grevillea xiphoidea Olde & Marriott		W.A.			
Grevillea yorkrakinensis C.A.Gardner		W.A.			
Grevillea zygoloba Olde & Marriott		W.A.			

== See also ==
- Category:Grevillea taxa by common name
- List of Grevillea cultivars
