= Grevillea xiphoidea =

Scientific classification
- Kingdom: Plantae
- Clade: Tracheophytes
- Clade: Angiosperms
- Clade: Eudicots
- Order: Proteales
- Family: Proteaceae
- Genus: Grevillea
- Species: G. xiphoidea

Binomial name
- Grevillea xiphoidea Olde & Marriott

Synonyms
- Grevillea paniculata population (p)

Species of shrub endemic to Western Australia

Grevillea xiphoidea is a species of flowering plant in the family Proteaceae and is endemic to a restricted part of inland areas of Western Australia. It is a dense shrub with divided leaves, the end lobes linear and sharply-pointed, and loose clusters of white to cream-coloured flowers.

== Description ==
Grevillea xiphoidea is a dense shrub that typically grows to a height of 1–3 m (3 ft 3 in – 9 ft 10 in) and has glabrous branchlets. Its leaves are 15–27 mm (0.59–1.06 in) long and divided with 2 or 3 lobes usually divided again, the end lobes linear, 10–25 mm (0.39–0.98 in) long, 0.8–1.4 mm (0.031–0.055 in) wide and sharply pointed. The edges of the leaves are rolled under, concealing most of the lower surface apart from the mid-vein. The flowers well-spaced in a more or less cylindrical group along a thread-like, more or less glabrous rachis. The flowers are white to cream-coloured and glabrous, the pistil 3.0–3.5 mm (0.12–0.14 in) long. Flowering occurs from June to September and the fruit is an oblong to elliptic follicle 7–9 mm (0.28–0.35 in) long.

== Taxonomy ==
Grevillea xiphoidea was first formally described by the botanists, Peter Olde and Neil Marriott in 1994 in the Grevillea Book. The specific epithet (xiphoidea) means "sword-like", referring to the shape of the leaf lobes.

== Distribution ==
This grevillea grows in shrubland in granitic soils, often around granite outcrops in the Muntadgin-Tandegin area of the Avon Wheatbelt and Mallee bioregions in southern inland Western Australia.

== Conservation status ==
Grevillea xiphoidea is listed as "not threatened" by the Government of Western Australia Department of Biodiversity, Conservation and Attractions.

== See also ==
- List of Grevillea species
