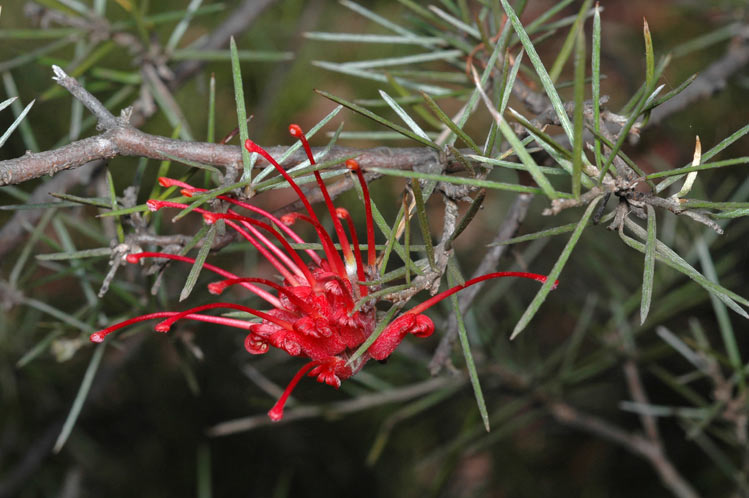
- In the Australian National Botanic Gardens

Conservation status
- Priority One — Poorly Known Taxa (DEC)

Scientific classification
- Kingdom: Plantae
- Clade: Tracheophytes
- Clade: Angiosperms
- Clade: Eudicots
- Order: Proteales
- Family: Proteaceae
- Genus: Grevillea
- Species: G. phillipsiana

Binomial name
- Grevillea phillipsiana McGill.

= Grevillea phillipsiana =

Species of shrub endemic to Western Australia

Grevillea phillipsiana is a species of flowering plant in the family Proteaceae and is endemic to the south of Western Australia. It is a prickly, spreading to erect shrub with linear leaves, and clusters of red flowers.

== Description ==
Grevillea phillipsiana is a prickly, spreading to erect shrub that typically grows to a height of 0.8–1.5 m (2 ft 7 in – 4 ft 11 in) and has linear or tapering leaves, 10–35 mm (0.39–1.38 in) long and 0.8–1.4 mm (0.031–0.055 in) wide. The edges of the leaves are rolled under enclosing most of the lower surface and the upper surface has ridges along its length. The flowers are usually arranged on the ends of branches in clusters of 2 to 14 on a silky-hairy rachis 1–4 mm (0.039–0.157 in) long. The flowers are red, the pistil 22–28 mm (0.87–1.10 in) long. Flowering occurs from July to September and the fruit is a narrowly oval follicle about 15 mm (0.59 in) long.

== Taxonomy ==
Grevillea phillipsiana was first formally described in 1986 by Donald McGillivray in his book New Names in Grevillea (Proteaceae) from specimens collected by Marie Elizabeth Phillips near Norseman in 1968. The specific epithet (phillipsiana) honours the collector of the type specimens.

== Distribution and habitat ==
This grevillea grows in shrubland, woodland and mallee scrub on rocky soil derived from granite, between Norseman and the Zanthus in the Coolgardie and Nullarbor bioregions of southern Western Australia.

== Conservation status ==
This grevillea is listed as "Priority One" by the Government of Western Australia Department of Biodiversity, Conservation and Attractions, meaning that it is known from only one or a few locations which are potentially at risk.

== See also ==
- List of Grevillea species
