= Grevillea microstyla =

Conservation status
- Priority Two — Poorly Known Taxa (DEC)

Scientific classification
- Kingdom: Plantae
- Clade: Tracheophytes
- Clade: Angiosperms
- Clade: Eudicots
- Order: Proteales
- Family: Proteaceae
- Genus: Grevillea
- Species: G. microstyla

Binomial name
- Grevillea microstyla M.D.Barrett & Makinson

Species of shrub endemic to Western Australia

Grevillea microstyla is a species of flowering plant in the family Proteaceae and is endemic to the Kimberley region of Western Australia. It is a small shrub with divided or toothed leaves with dense clusters of crimson flowers that have a dull orange style.

== Description ==
Grevillea microstyla is shrub that typically grows to a height of 30–80 cm (12–31 in) and forms a lignotuber. Its leaves are egg-shaped to broadly oblong, 30–83 mm (1.2–3.3 in) long and 20–43 mm (0.79–1.69 in) wide in outline, but with 7 to 15 triangular teeth or lobes. The flowers are arranged in dense, more or less spherical clusters on a rachis 5–8 mm (0.20–0.31 in) long and are crimson with a dull orange style, the pistil 5.5–7 mm (0.22–0.28 in) long. Flowering occurs from December to June, and the fruit is an oblong follicle 11–16 mm (0.43–0.63 in) long.

== Taxonomy ==
Grevillea microstyla was first formally described in 2000 by Matthew Barrett and Robert Makinson in the Flora of Australia from specimens collected in 1998. The specific epithet (microstyla) means "having a small style".

== Distribution and habitat ==
This grevillea grows in grassy woodland in shallow valleys and below ridges in the western Kimberley region of northern Western Australia.

== Conservation status ==
Grevillea microstyla is listed as priority two by the Western Australian Government Department of Biodiversity, Conservation and Attractions, meaning that it is poorly known and from only one or a few locations.

== See also ==
- List of Grevillea species
