= Grevillea stenogyne =

Conservation status
- Priority One — Poorly Known Taxa (DEC)

Scientific classification
- Kingdom: Plantae
- Clade: Tracheophytes
- Clade: Angiosperms
- Clade: Eudicots
- Order: Proteales
- Family: Proteaceae
- Genus: Grevillea
- Species: G. stenogyne

Binomial name
- Grevillea stenogyne (Benth.) Makinson

Synonyms
- Grevillea vestita var. stenogyne Benth.

Species of shrub endemic to Western Australia

Grevillea stenogyne is a species of flowering plant in the family Proteaceae and is only known from the type collection, made in the southwest of Western Australia. It is a shrub with divided leaves, the end lobes triangular and sharply-pointed, and clusters of white flowers.

== Description ==
Grevillea stenogyne is a shrub with woolly-hairy branchlets. The leaves are 15–20 mm (0.59–0.79 in) long and 13–20 mm (0.51–0.79 in) wide with 3 lobes that are further divided into 3, the end lobes triangular, mostly 3–7 mm (0.12–0.28 in) long, 1–3 mm (0.039–0.118 in) wide and sharply pointed. The edges of the leaves are rolled under, but the lower surface is mostly exposed and woolly-hairy. The flowers are arranged in more or less spherical to conical clusters on a glabrous rachis, the flowers at the base of the clusters opening first. The flowers are probably whitish and glabrous on the outside, the pistil about 4 mm (0.157 in) long.

== Taxonomy and naming ==
This grevillea was first formally described in 1870 by George Bentham who gave it the name Grevillea vestita var. stenogyne in Flora Australiensis from specimens collected by James Drummond. In 2000, Robert Owen Makinson raised the variety to species status as Grevillea stenogyne in the Flora of Australia. The specific epithet (stenogyne) means "narrow pistil".

== Distribution ==
Grevillea stenogyne occurs in the south-west of Western Australia. The range and habitat of the species is not known.

== Conservation status ==
Grevillea stenogyne is listed as "Priority One" by the Government of Western Australia Department of Biodiversity, Conservation and Attractions, meaning that it is known from only one or a few locations that are potentially at risk.

== See also ==
- List of Grevillea species
