= Grevillea vuniana =

Conservation status
- Critically Endangered (IUCN 3.1)

Scientific classification
- Kingdom: Plantae
- Clade: Tracheophytes
- Clade: Angiosperms
- Clade: Eudicots
- Order: Proteales
- Family: Proteaceae
- Genus: Grevillea
- Species: G. vuniana

Binomial name
- Grevillea vuniana Pillon (2020)

Species of flowering plant

Grevillea vuniana, commonly known as Lanterne rouge d’Unia, is a species of flowering plant in the family Proteaceae endemic to New Caledonia's Southern province. It is a small tree with elliptic leaves and clusters of twenty to forty reddish flowers.

== Description ==
Grevillea vuniana is a shrub or small tree that typically grows to a height of up to 6 m (20 ft). Its leaves are egg-shaped, elliptic, spatula-shaped to wedge-shaped mostly 130–200 mm (5.1–7.9 in) long, 40–62 mm (1.6–2.4 in) wide on a petiole 7–12 mm (0.28–0.47 in) long. The flowers are borne in groups of 20 to 40 on the ends of branches, on a peduncle 18–25 mm (0.71–0.98 in) long, each flower on a pedicel 7–10 mm (0.28–0.39 in) long and reddish. The fruit is flattened, ridged and glabrous with the remain of the style attached.

== Taxonomy ==
Grevillea vuniana was first formally described in 2020 by Yohan Pillon in the journal Phytotaxa . The specific epithet (vuniana) is from the name of the nearby tribe of Unia ("Vunia" in the local language), where the plant was located.

== Distribution and habitat ==
Grevillea vuniana has only been seen in the vicinity of Lake Chakeke. It is found in a low wet forest and along the forest edge, where it is in proximity to a temporary lake and a temporary river. The species occurs 100–500 m (330–1,640 ft) above sea level. Its population size is assumed to be very small and the area it occupies is assumed to be about 4 km^{2} (1.5 sq mi).

== See also ==
- List of Grevillea species
