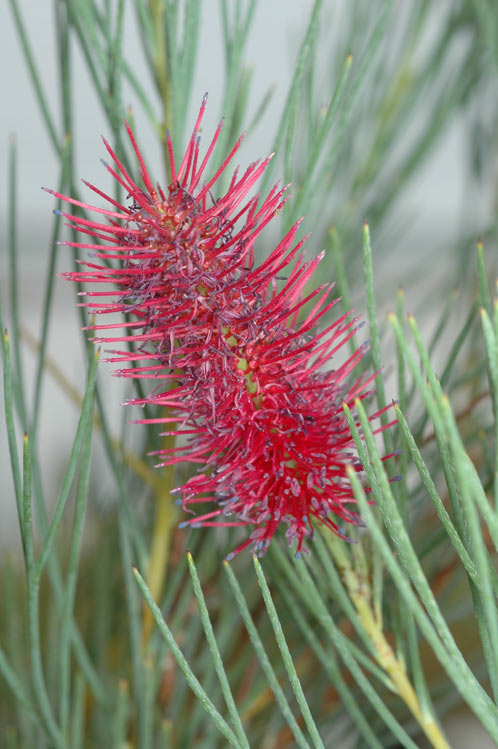
- In the Australian National Botanic Gardens

Scientific classification
- Kingdom: Plantae
- Clade: Tracheophytes
- Clade: Angiosperms
- Clade: Eudicots
- Order: Proteales
- Family: Proteaceae
- Genus: Grevillea
- Species: G. oligomera

Binomial name
- Grevillea oligomera (McGill.) Olde & Marriott

= Grevillea oligomera =

Species of shrub endemic to Western Australia

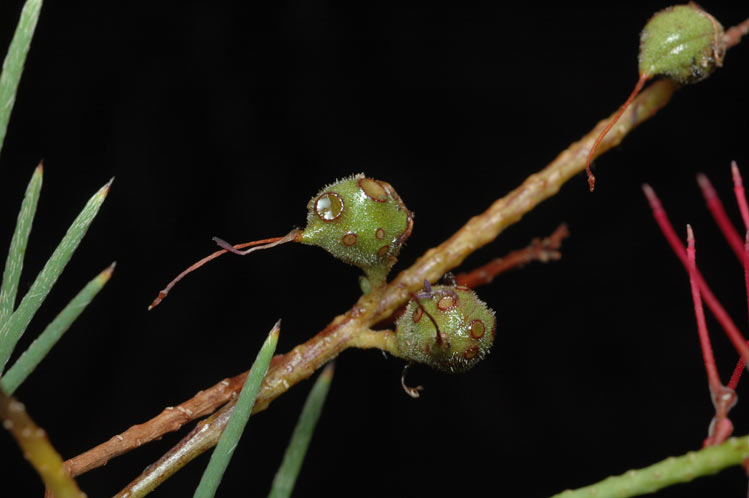
Fruit

Grevillea oligomera is a species of flowering plant in the family Proteaceae and is endemic to inland areas of Western Australia. It is an erect shrub with sometimes-divided leaves, the leaves or lobes linear, and reddish-pink and blue-grey flowers with a reddish-pink style.

== Description ==
Grevillea oligomera is an erect shrub that typically grows to a height of 1–2 m (3 ft 3 in – 6 ft 7 in), the branchlets usually on one side of the stems. Its leaves are 30–160 mm (1.2–6.3 in) long in outline and sometimes divided, the leaves and end lobes linear to more or less cylindrical, and 1.0–1.3 mm (0.039–0.051 in) wide. Divided leaves have up to ten lobes 25–90 mm (0.98–3.54 in) long. The flowers are arranged on the end of branches in more or less cylindrical groups, mostly within the foliage, on a glabrous rachis 30–75 mm (1.2–3.0 in) long. The flowers are reddish pink and bluish-grey with a pinkish-red style, the pistil 14–15 mm (0.55–0.59 in) long. Flowering mainly occurs from July to December and the fruit is an oval to spherical follicle about 7 mm (0.28 in) long, usually with sticky craters.

== Taxonomy ==
This grevillea was first formally described in 1986 by Donald McGillivray who gave it the name Grevillea petrophiloides subsp. oligomera, in his book New Names in Grevillea (Proteaceae) from specimens collected about 59 mi (95 km) north of Kalgoorlie. In 1994, Peter M. Olde and Neil R. Marriott raised the subspecies to species status as G. oligomera in The Grevillea Book. The specific epithet (oligomera) means "few parts", in this case, the leaf lobes.

== Distribution and habitat ==
Grevillea oligomera grows in shrubland on sandplains and ironstone hills between Merredin, Coolgardie and Menzies in the Coolgardie and Murchison bioregions of inland Western Australia.

== See also ==
- List of Grevillea species
