= Grevillea brevis =

Conservation status
- Least Concern (IUCN 3.1)

Scientific classification
- Kingdom: Plantae
- Clade: Embryophytes
- Clade: Tracheophytes
- Clade: Spermatophytes
- Clade: Angiosperms
- Clade: Eudicots
- Order: Proteales
- Family: Proteaceae
- Genus: Grevillea
- Species: G. brevis

Binomial name
- Grevillea brevis Olde & Marriott

Species of shrub native to Australia

Grevillea brevis is a species of flowering plant in the family Proteaceae and is endemic to the Northern Territory. It is an erect, open shrub with elliptic leaves and white to yellow or creamy-green flowers.

== Description ==
Grevillea brevis is an erect, open shrub that typically grows to a height of 1–2.5 m (3 ft 3 in – 8 ft 2 in). Its leaves are elliptic, sometime with up to three short teeth or lobes, more or less glabrous, 70–150 mm (2.8–5.9 in) long and 6–15 mm (0.24–0.59 in) wide. The flowers are arranged in cylindrical to oval or more or less spherical groups near the ends of branches, on a rachis 10–30 mm (0.39–1.18 in) long, and are white to yellow or creamy-green, the style pale green to cream-coloured. The pistil is 8.0–12.5 mm (0.31–0.49 in) long and the ovary and style are glabrous. Flowering occurs from March to July and the fruit is a glabrous, elliptic follicle 13–15 mm (0.51–0.59 in) long.

== Taxonomy ==
Grevillea brevis was first formally described in 1993 by Peter M. Olde and Neil R. Marriott in the journal Telopea, based on plant material collected in Kakadu National Park in 1990. The specific epithet (brevis) means "short", referring to the length of the pistil, compared to similar grevilleas, especially G. glabrescens.

== Distribution and habitat ==
This grevillea usually grows in heathland on sandstone plateaux and is confined to a few areas on the Marawal Plateau in Kakadu National Park.

== Conservation status ==
Grevillea brevis is listed as least concern on the IUCN Red List of Threatened Species. Although it has a restricted distribution, it is relatively common within its range, it occurs within a protected area, its population is presumed to be stable and there are no known major threats, either current or in the near future.
