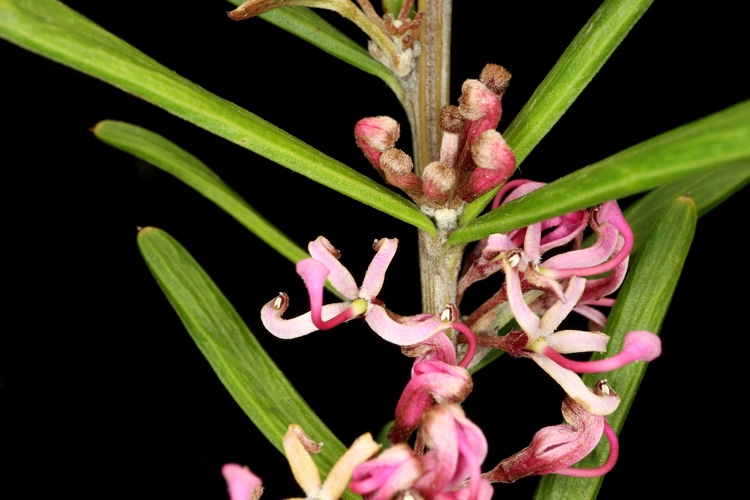

Scientific classification
- Kingdom: Plantae
- Clade: Tracheophytes
- Clade: Angiosperms
- Clade: Eudicots
- Order: Proteales
- Family: Proteaceae
- Genus: Grevillea
- Species: G. quinquenervis

Binomial name
- Grevillea quinquenervis J.M.Black

= Grevillea quinquenervis =

Species of shrub endemic to South Australia

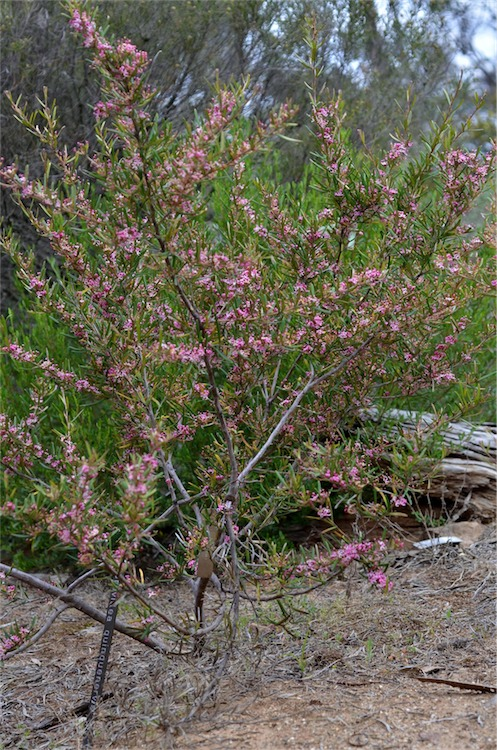
Habit in the Australian National Botanic Gardens

Grevillea quinquenervis, also known as the five-nerved grevillea, is a species of flowering plant in the family Proteaceae and is endemic to the western end of Kangaroo Island in South Australia. It is an erect, dense shrub with more or less linear to oblong or narrowly egg-shaped leaves and clusters of pale to deep pink flowers.

== Description ==
Grevillea quinquenervis is an erect, dense shrub that typically grows to a height of 1.0–1.5 m (3 ft 3 in – 4 ft 11 in) high and has angular, hairy branchlets. Its leaves are more or less linear to oblong or narrowly egg-shaped with the narrower end towards the base, 15–60 mm (0.59–2.36 in) long and 1.5–8 mm (0.059–0.315 in) wide with the edges strongly curved downwards or rolled under. The upper surface of the leaves usually has 5 prominent, longitudinal veins. The flowers are arranged on the ends of branches or short side-branchlets in groups of 6 to 20 and are pale to deep pink, the pistil 9.5–12 mm (0.37–0.47 in) long. Flowering mainly occurs from October to December and the fruit is an oval to oblong follicle 13–15 mm (0.51–0.59 in) long.

== Taxonomy ==
Grevillea quinquenervis was first formally described in 1909 by John McConnell Black in Transactions, proceedings and report, Royal Society of South Australia from specimens collected in 1908. The specific epithet (quinquenervis) refers to the five-veined leaves.

== Distribution and habitat ==
Five-nerved grevillea grows in heath, shrubland and forest on the western half of Kangaroo Island in South Australia.

== See also ==
- List of Grevillea species
