= Grevillea maherae =

Conservation status
- Vulnerable (IUCN 3.1)

- Priority One — Poorly Known Taxa (DEC)

Scientific classification
- Kingdom: Plantae
- Clade: Tracheophytes
- Clade: Angiosperms
- Clade: Eudicots
- Order: Proteales
- Family: Proteaceae
- Genus: Grevillea
- Species: G. maherae

Binomial name
- Grevillea maherae Makinson & M.D.Barrett

Species of shrub endemic to Western Australia

Grevillea maherae is a species of flowering plant in the family Proteaceae and is endemic to the Kimberley region of Western Australia. It is a densely-branched shrub with divided leaves with sharply pointed lobes, and clusters of pinkish red to maroon flowers with a red style.

== Description ==
Grevillea maherae is a low, spreading or weakly erect shrub that typically gros to a height of 15–50 cm (5.9–19.7 in) and has many stems. The leaves are 40–65 mm (1.6–2.6 in) long and 20–34 mm (0.79–1.34 in) wide in outline, with 9 to 13 sharply-pointed, more or less triangular teeth 2–6 mm (0.079–0.236 in) long and 3–5 mm (0.12–0.20 in) wide on the edges. The flowers are arranged on one side of a rachis mostly 10–20 mm (0.39–0.79 in) long and are pinkish red to maroon, the pistil 29–30 mm (1.1–1.2 in) long. Flowering occurs from December to March, and the fruit is a woolly-hairy follicle 11–13 mm (0.43–0.51 in) long.

== Taxonomy ==
Grevillea maherae was first formally described in 2000 by Robert Makinson and Matthew Barrett in the Flora of Australia from specimens collected by Barrett on Mount Elizabeth Homestead in 1998. The specific epithet (maherae) honours Robyn Maher, who discovered the plant.

== Distribution and habitat ==
This grevillea is only known from Mount Elizabeth Station where it grows in grassy woodland.

== Conservation status ==
Grevillea maherae is listed as 'Priority One' by the Government of Western Australia Department of Biodiversity, Conservation and Attractions, meaning that it is known from only one or a few locations which are potentially at risk, but as 'Vulnerable' by the IUCN Red List.

== See also ==
- List of Grevillea species
