= Grevillea lissopleura =

Conservation status
- Priority One — Poorly Known Taxa (DEC)

Scientific classification
- Kingdom: Plantae
- Clade: Embryophytes
- Clade: Tracheophytes
- Clade: Angiosperms
- Clade: Eudicots
- Order: Proteales
- Family: Proteaceae
- Genus: Grevillea
- Species: G. lissopleura

Binomial name
- Grevillea lissopleura McGill.

Species of shrub endemic to Western Australia

Grevillea lissopleura is a species of flowering plant in the family Proteaceae and is endemic to a relatively small area of inland Western Australia. It is an erect shrub with linear leaves and clusters of white to cream-coloured flowers.

== Description ==
Grevillea lissopleura is an erect shrub that typically grows to a height of 0.5–1.2 m (1 ft 8 in – 3 ft 11 in). Its leaves are linear, 10–35 mm (0.39–1.38 in) long and 1.0–1.2 mm (0.039–0.047 in) wide, the edges rolled under almost to the midvein. The flowers are arranged in erect, sessile clusters on the ends of branches or in upper leaf axils on a woolly-hairy rachis 1–2 mm (0.039–0.079 in) long. The flowers are white to cream-coloured, silky- to woolly-hairy on the outside, the pistil 7–8 mm (0.28–0.31 in) long. Flowering has been recorded in August and the fruit is an oval follicle 6–9 mm (0.24–0.35 in) long.

== Taxonomy ==
Grevillea lissopleura was first formally described in 1986 by Donald McGillivray in his book, New Names in Grevillea (Proteaceae) from specimens collected in 1979. The specific epithet, (lissopleura), means "smooth rib", referring to the leaf veins.

== Distribution and habitat ==
This grevillea grows on rocky ridges in shrubland between Southern Cross and Mount Holland in the Avon Wheatbelt, Coolgardie and Mallee bioregions of inland Western Australia.

== Conservation status ==
Grevillea lissopleura is listed as 'Priority One' by the Government of Western Australia Department of Biodiversity, Conservation and Attractions, meaning that it is known from only one or a few locations which are potentially at risk.

== See also ==
- List of Grevillea species
