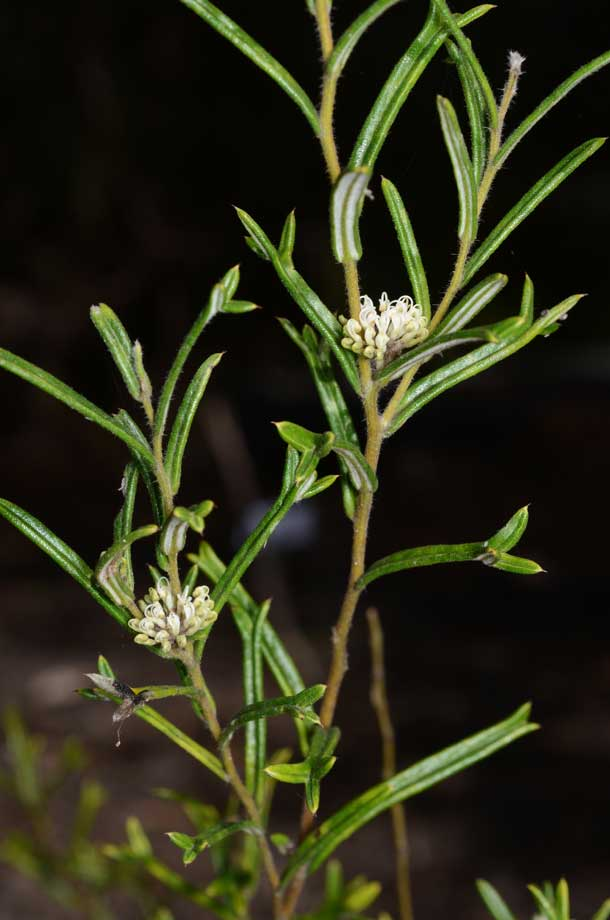
- In the Hunter Region Botanic Gardens

Conservation status
- Critically Endangered (IUCN 3.1)

- Priority One — Poorly Known Taxa (DEC)

Scientific classification
- Kingdom: Plantae
- Clade: Embryophytes
- Clade: Tracheophytes
- Clade: Angiosperms
- Clade: Eudicots
- Order: Proteales
- Family: Proteaceae
- Genus: Grevillea
- Species: G. marriottii

Binomial name
- Grevillea marriottii Olde

= Grevillea marriottii =

Species of shrub endemic to Western Australia

Grevillea marriottii is a species of flowering plant in the family Proteaceae and is endemic to a restricted area of inland Western Australia. It is an open shrub with both simple linear, and divided leaves with linear lobes, and clusters of whitish flowers with a white style sometimes tinged with pink.

== Description ==
Grevillea marriottii is an open shrub that typically grows to a height of 0.8–1.2 m (2 ft 7 in – 3 ft 11 in), has many stems and forms a lignotuber. The leaves are a mixture of linear leaves 10–50 mm (0.39–1.97 in) long and 15–35 mm (0.59–1.38 in) wide and divided leaves with two or three lobes up to 10 mm (0.39 in) long and 2.5 mm (0.098 in) wide. The edges of the leaves are rolled under, the partly-exposed lower surface shaggy-hairy. The flowers are arranged in small clusters on a shaggy-hairy rachis 3–5 mm (0.12–0.20 in) long and are whitish with a white style sometimes tinged with pink, the pistil 8–12 mm (0.31–0.47 in) long. Flowering occurs from July to October and the fruit is an oblong follicle 10–14 mm (0.39–0.55 in) long.

== Taxonomy ==
Grevillea marriottii was first formally described in 1990 by Peter M. Olde in The Western Australian Naturalist from specimens collected near Mount Holland in 1988. The specific epithet (marriottii) honours Neil R. Marriott.

== Distribution and habitat ==
This grevillea grows in sand on hills or laterite and is only known from near Mount Holland, south of Southern Cross in the Coolgardie bioregion of inland Western Australia.

== Conservation status ==
Grevillea marriottii is listed as priority one by the Government of Western Australia Department of Biodiversity, Conservation and Attractions, meaning that it is known from only one or a few locations which are potentially at risk.

== See also ==
- List of Grevillea species
