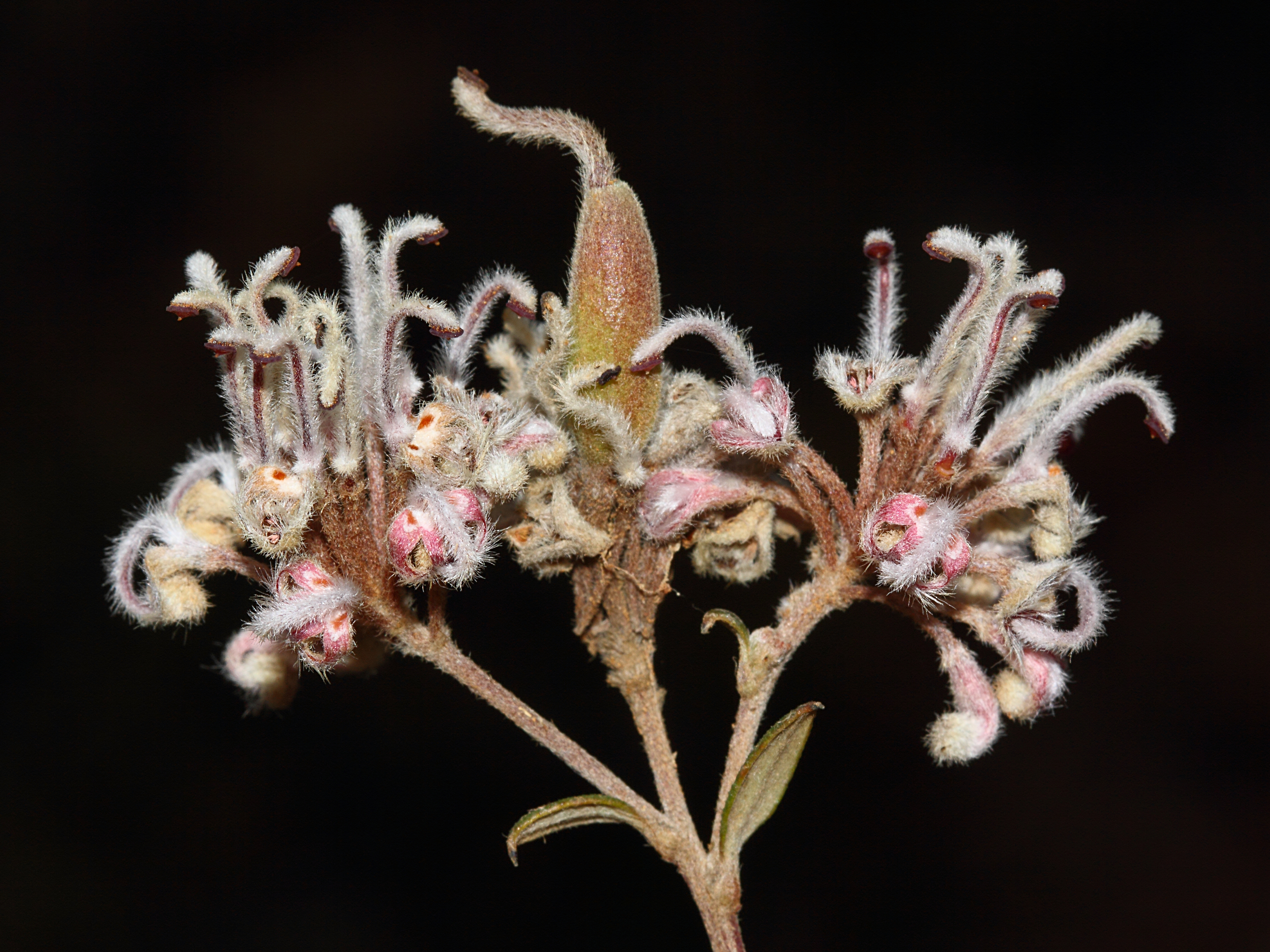

Scientific classification
- Kingdom: Plantae
- Clade: Tracheophytes
- Clade: Angiosperms
- Clade: Eudicots
- Order: Proteales
- Family: Proteaceae
- Genus: Grevillea
- Species: G. occidentalis

Binomial name
- Grevillea occidentalis R.Br.

= Grevillea occidentalis =

Species of shrub endemic to Western Australia

Grevillea occidentalis is a species of flowering plant in the family Proteaceae and is endemic to the south of Western Australia. It is a spreading to erect shrub with linear to narrowly egg-shaped or narrowly elliptic leaves and grey or off-white flowers.

== Description ==
Grevillea occidentalis is a spreading to erect shrub that typically grows to a height of 0.4–1 m (1 ft 4 in – 3 ft 3 in) or more. Its leaves are linear to narrowly elliptic or narrowly egg-shaped, sometimes with the narrower end towards the base, 3–50 mm (0.12–1.97 in) long and 0.8–10 mm (0.031–0.394 in) wide with the edges turned down or rolled under, usually enclosing most of the lower surface. The flowers are arranged in more or less spherical clusters of hairy grey to off-white and brown flowers, the pistil 8–11 mm (0.31–0.43 in) long. Flowering mainly occurs from August to February and the fruit is an oval to oblong follicle 8–11 mm (0.31–0.43 in) long.

== Taxonomy ==
Grevillea occidentalis was first formally described in 1810 by Robert Brown in Transactions of the Linnean Society of London. The specific epithet (occidentalis) means "western".

== Distribution and habitat ==
This grevillea grows in heath and woodland between Kojonup, Walpole and Albany in the Avon Wheatbelt, Esperance Plains, Jarrah Forest and Warren bioregions of southern Western Australia.

== See also ==
- List of Grevillea species
