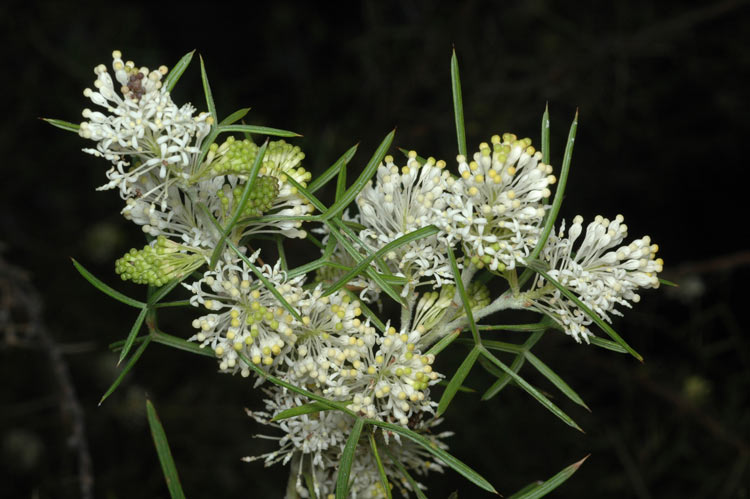
- In the Australian National Botanic Gardens

Conservation status
- Priority Three — Poorly Known Taxa (DEC)

Scientific classification
- Kingdom: Plantae
- Clade: Tracheophytes
- Clade: Angiosperms
- Clade: Eudicots
- Order: Proteales
- Family: Proteaceae
- Genus: Grevillea
- Species: G. triloba

Binomial name
- Grevillea triloba Meisn.

= Grevillea triloba =

Species of shrub endemic to Western Australia

Grevillea triloba is species of flowering plant in the family Proteaceae and is endemic to near Geraldton in Western Australia. It is a diffuse or spreading shrub, usually with divided leaves with 3 spreading, linear lobes, and clusters of white flowers.

== Description ==
Grevillea trilobais a diffuse or spreading shrub that typically grows to a height of 0.9–1.5 m (2 ft 11 in – 4 ft 11 in), its branchlets woolly- to shaggy-hairy. The leaves are usually divided, 30–70 mm (1.2–2.8 in) long, usually with 3 spreading lobes 12–43 mm (0.47–1.69 in) long, 1–4.5 mm (0.039–0.177 in) wide. Sometimes the leaves are broadly linear and 3–8 mm (0.12–0.31 in) wide. The edges of the leaves are turned down to rolled under without concealing the woolly-hairy lower surface. The flowers are arranged in conical to more or less cylindrical clusters on a woolly-hairy rachis, the flowers nearer the base of the rachis flowering first. The flowers are white or pinkish, the pistil 3.6–4.3 mm (0.14–0.17 in) long. Flowering mainly occurs from July to October, and the fruit is an oblong to elliptic follicle 8–10 mm (0.31–0.39 in) long with a wrinkled surface.

== Taxonomy ==
Grevillea triloba was first formally described by the botanist Carl Meissner in 1855 in William Jackson Hooker's Journal of Botany and Kew Garden Miscellany from specimens collected by James Drummond.

The specific epithet (triloba) means "three-lobed", referring to the leaves.

== Distribution ==
This grevillea grows in heath and shrubby woodland in sandy loam or lateritic soils in near-coastal areas from Geraldton to near Northampton in the Geraldton Sandplains bioregion of Western Australia.

== Conservation status ==
Grevillea triloba is listed as 'Priority Three' by the Government of Western Australia Department of Biodiversity, Conservation and Attractions, meaning that it is poorly known and known from only a few locations but is not under imminent threat.

== Use in horticulture ==
Commonly cultivated, G. triloba is a vigorous plant that is suited to most soils and aspects. The prickly leaves make it suitable as a screening plant.

== See also ==
- List of Grevillea species
