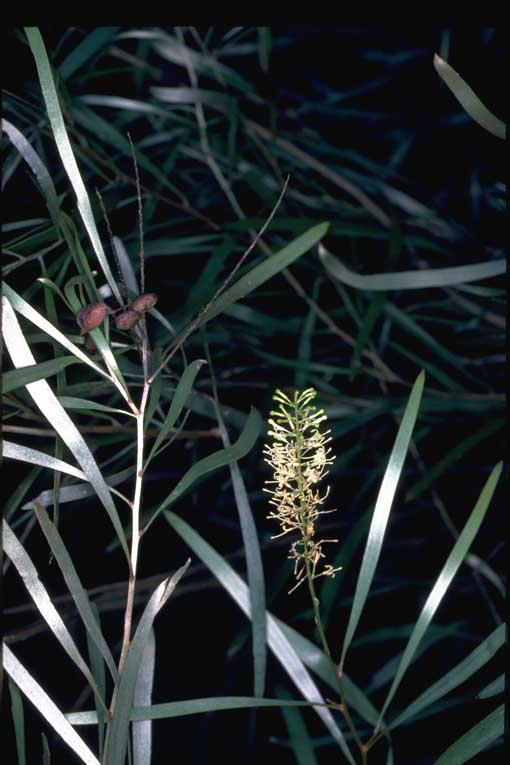
- In the Bungle Bungle Range

Conservation status
- Priority Two — Poorly Known Taxa (DEC)

Scientific classification
- Kingdom: Plantae
- Clade: Tracheophytes
- Clade: Angiosperms
- Clade: Eudicots
- Order: Proteales
- Family: Proteaceae
- Genus: Grevillea
- Species: G. psilantha

Binomial name
- Grevillea psilantha McGill.

= Grevillea psilantha =

Species of shrub endemic to Western Australia

Grevillea psilantha is a species of flowering plant in the family Proteaceae and is endemic to a small area in the Kimberley region of Western Australia. It is an erect shrub with erect, linear to narrowly egg-shaped leaves, and cylindrical clusters of white to cream-coloured flowers.

== Description ==
Grevillea psilantha is an erect shrub that typically grows to a height of up to 1 m (3 ft 3 in). Its leaves are linear to narrowly egg-shaped with the narrower end towards the base, 70–150 mm (2.8–5.9 in) long and 2.5–7.2 mm (0.098–0.283 in) wide on a short petiole. Both surface of the leaves are similar with several faint, parallel veins. The flowers are arranged on the ends of branches in open, cylindrical clusters 90–110 mm (3.5–4.3 in) long, the flowers at the base of the cluster opening first. The flowers are white to cream-coloured, the pistil 7–8 mm (0.28–0.31 in) long. Flowering occurs from April to July and the fruit is a flattened oval follicle 9–14 mm (0.35–0.55 in) long.

== Taxonomy ==
Grevillea psilantha was first formally described in 1986 by Donald McGillivray in his book New Names in Grevillea (Proteaceae) from specimens collected by Kevin Francis Kenneally, in the Bungle Bungle Range in 1984. The specific epithet (psilantha) means "smooth-flowered".

== Distribution and habitat ==
This grevillea grows in crevices in the walls of sandstone gorges in the Bungle Bungle Range, in the eastern part of Kimberley region of Western Australia.

== Conservation status ==
Grevillea psilantha is listed as "Priority Two" by the Western Australian Government Department of Biodiversity, Conservation and Attractions, meaning that it is poorly known and from only one or a few locations.

== See also ==
- List of Grevillea species
