= Grevillea punctata =

Conservation status
- Priority Three — Poorly Known Taxa (DEC)

Scientific classification
- Kingdom: Plantae
- Clade: Tracheophytes
- Clade: Angiosperms
- Clade: Eudicots
- Order: Proteales
- Family: Proteaceae
- Genus: Grevillea
- Species: G. punctata

Binomial name
- Grevillea punctata Olde & Marriott

Species of shrub endemic to Western Australia

Grevillea punctata is a species of flowering plant in the family Proteaceae and is endemic to a restricted part of the South West region of Western Australia. It is a shrub with oblong to elliptic leaves and scarlet flowers.

== Description ==
Grevillea punctata is an erect, open shrub that typically grows to a height of 0.5–2 m (1 ft 8 in – 6 ft 7 in). Its leaves are oblong to elliptic, 5–18 mm (0.20–0.71 in) long and 1.5–3 mm (0.059–0.118 in) wide with the edges rolled under. The flowers are usually arranged on the ends of short side branches in almost sessile groups of two or three on a woolly-hairy rachis about 1 mm (0.039 in) long. The flowers are scarlet, the pistil 14–16 mm (0.55–0.63 in) long. Flowering occurs from June to November and the fruit is an oval follicle 12–15 mm (0.47–0.59 in) long and 6–7 mm (0.24–0.28 in) wide.

== Taxonomy ==
Grevillea punctata was first formally described in 1994 by Peter Olde and Neil Marriott in The Grevillea Book from specimens collected by Bill Molyneux, east of Ravensthorpe in 1978. The specific epithet (punctata) means "dotted with small spots".

== Distribution and habitat ==
This grevillea grows in low, open shrubland and is only known from near Jerdacuttup in the Esperance Plains bioregion of south-western Western Australia.

== Conservation status ==
Grevillea punctata is listed as "Priority Three" by the Government of Western Australia Department of Biodiversity, Conservation and Attractions, meaning that it is poorly known and known from only a few locations but is not under imminent threat.

== See also ==
- List of Grevillea species
