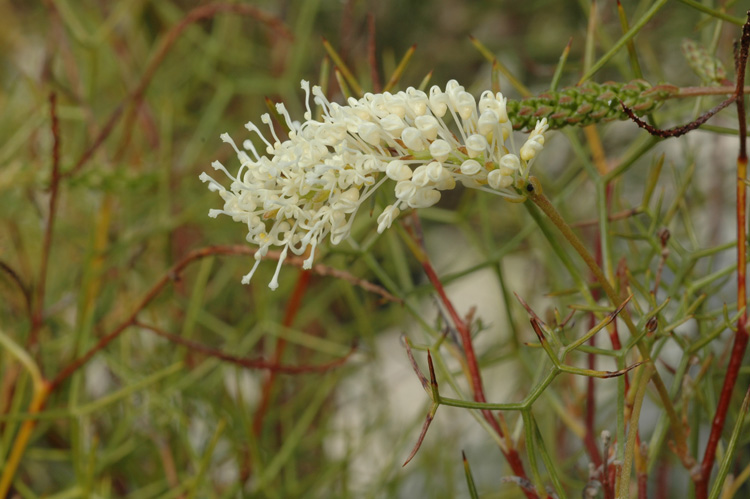

Conservation status
- Priority One — Poorly Known Taxa (DEC)

Scientific classification
- Kingdom: Plantae
- Clade: Tracheophytes
- Clade: Angiosperms
- Clade: Eudicots
- Order: Proteales
- Family: Proteaceae
- Genus: Grevillea
- Species: G. minutiflora

Binomial name
- Grevillea minutiflora McGill.

= Grevillea minutiflora =

Species of shrub endemic to Western Australia

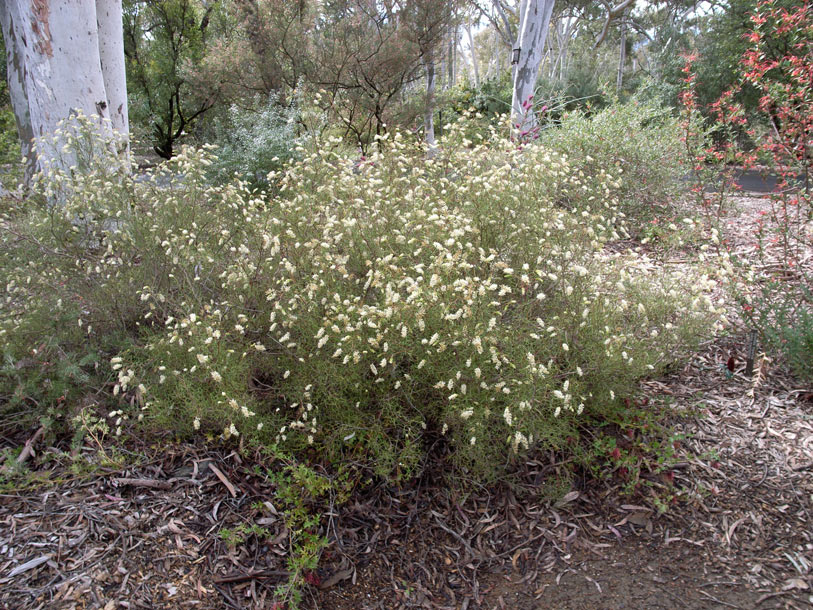
Habit in the Australian National Botanic Gardens

Grevillea minutiflora is a species of flowering plant in the family Proteaceae and is endemic to the south-west of Western Australia. It is a shrub with many branches, tangled, divided leaves, the end lobes more or less linear, and cylindrical clusters of creamy-white flowers.

== Description ==
Grevillea minutiflora is a dense shrub that typically grows to a height of 1–2 m (3 ft 3 in – 6 ft 7 in) and has many branches and tangled leaves. The leaves are 30–60 mm (1.2–2.4 in) long in outline, but divided with five lobes that are further divided, the end lobes more or less linear, 10–25 mm (0.39–0.98 in) long and 0.4–0.8 mm (0.016–0.031 in) wide. The flowers are arranged on the ends of the branches in more or less cylindrical clusters on a rachis 20–30 mm (0.79–1.18 in) long and are creamy-white, the pistil 4.5 mm (0.18 in) long. Flowering occurs from April to September, and the fruit is an oblong to elliptic follicle 7.5–8.5 mm (0.30–0.33 in) long.

== Taxonomy ==
Grevillea minutiflora was first formally described in 1986 by Donald McGillivray in his book New Names in Grevillea (Proteaceae) from specimens collected near Mukinbudin in 1976. The specific epithet (minutiflora) means "very small-flowered".

== Distribution and habitat ==
This grevillea grows in shrubland and is restricted to the area around Mukinbudin in the Avon Wheatbelt bioregion of inland south-western Western Australia.

== Conservation status ==
Grevillea minutiflora is listed as priority one by the Government of Western Australia Department of Biodiversity, Conservation and Attractions, meaning that it is known from only one or a few locations which are potentially at risk.

== See also ==
- List of Grevillea species
