= Grevillea sulcata =

Conservation status
- Priority One — Poorly Known Taxa (DEC)

Scientific classification
- Kingdom: Plantae
- Clade: Tracheophytes
- Clade: Angiosperms
- Clade: Eudicots
- Order: Proteales
- Family: Proteaceae
- Genus: Grevillea
- Species: G. sulcata

Binomial name
- Grevillea sulcata C.A.Gardner ex Olde & Marriott

Species of shrub endemic to Western Australia

Grevillea sulcata is a species of flowering plant in the family Proteaceae and is endemic to a restricted area in the south of Western Australia. It is a robust, spreading shrub with linear leaves and erect clusters of up to 14 scarlet flowers with an orange pollen presenter.

== Description ==
Grevillea sulcata is a robust, spreading shrub that typically grows to a height of 0.3–1.5 m (1 ft 0 in – 4 ft 11 in). Its leaves are linear, 10–30 mm (0.39–1.18 in) long and 1.0–1.8 mm (0.039–0.071 in) wide with 2 to 5 longitudinal ribs. The edges of the leaves are rolled under, concealing the lower surface apart from the mid-rib. The flowers are arranged in clusters of 2 to 14 on the ends of branches or in leaf axils on a rachis 1.0–1.5 mm (0.039–0.059 in) long. The flowers are scarlet with an orange pollen presenter, the pistil 15–16 mm (0.59–0.63 in) long. Flowering occurs from July to September, and the fruit is an oval follicle 13 mm (0.51 in) long.

== Taxonomy ==
Grevillea sulcata was first formally described in 1994 in The Grevillea Book from an unpublished description by Charles Gardner of specimens he collected at Cocanarup, near Ravensthorpe in 1924. The specific epithet (sulcata) means "furrowed", referring to the leaves.

== Distribution and habitat ==
This grevillea grows in rich loamy soil in woodland with species of Dodonaea, and is only known from near the type location about 11 km (6.8 mi) west of Ravensthorpe in the Esperance Plains bioregion of southern Western Australia.

== Conservation status ==
Grevillea sulcata is listed as "Priority One" by the Government of Western Australia Department of Biodiversity, Conservation and Attractions, meaning that it is known from only one or a few locations which are potentially at risk.

== See also ==
- List of Grevillea species
