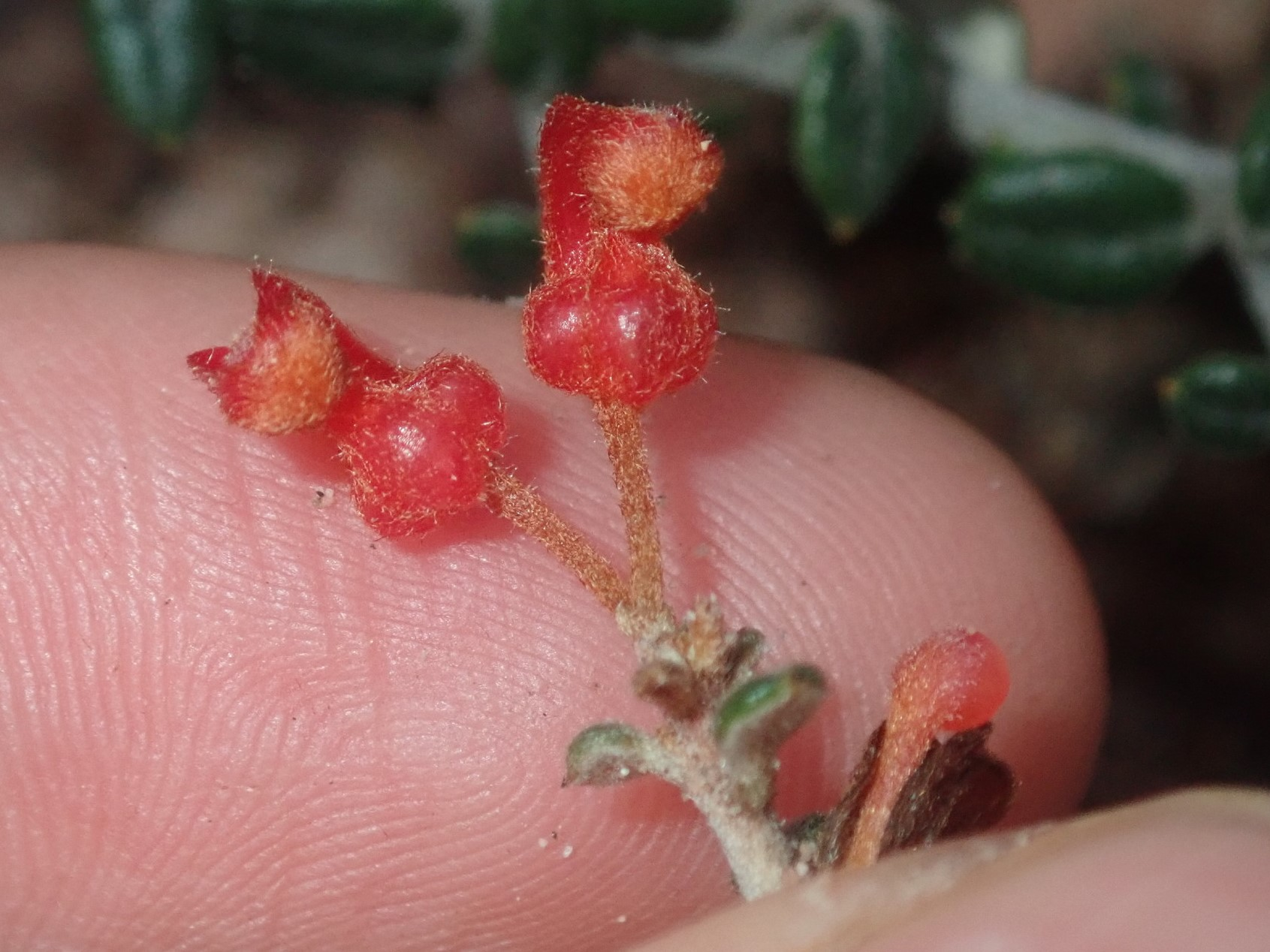

Conservation status
- Least Concern (IUCN 3.1)

Scientific classification
- Kingdom: Plantae
- Clade: Embryophytes
- Clade: Tracheophytes
- Clade: Spermatophytes
- Clade: Angiosperms
- Clade: Eudicots
- Order: Proteales
- Family: Proteaceae
- Genus: Grevillea
- Species: G. crassifolia

Binomial name
- Grevillea crassifolia Domin

= Grevillea crassifolia =

Species of shrub endemic to Western Australia

Grevillea crassifolia is a species of flowering plant in the family Proteaceae and is endemic to the south-west of Western Australia. It is an open shrub with often thick, elliptic to oblong leaves and red flowers.

== Description ==
Grevillea crassifolia is an open shrub that typically grows to a height of 0.3–1 m (1 ft 0 in – 3 ft 3 in). Its leaves are elliptic to oblong, often thick, 5–20 mm (0.20–0.79 in) long and 2–6 mm (0.079–0.236 in) wide with the edges turned down or rolled under, the lower surface densely covered with matted hairs. The flowers are arranged in groups of up to four in leaf axils or on the ends of short side branches and are red, the pistil 6–9 mm (0.24–0.35 in) long with a short style. Flowering occurs from June to December and the fruit is an oval follicle about 13 mm (0.51 in) long.

== Taxonomy ==
Grevillea crassifolia was first formally described in 1923 by Karel Domin in Vestnik Kralovske Ceske Spolecnosti Nauk, Trida Matematiko-Prirodevedecke from specimens collected by Arthur Dorrien-Smith. The specific epithet (crassifolia) means "thick-leaved".

== Distribution and habitat ==
This grevillea grows in low shrubland in scattered populations on slopes in the Stirling Range National Park.

== Conservation status ==
Grevillea crassifolia is listed as least concern on the IUCN Red List and as not threatened by the Government of Western Australia Department of Biodiversity, Conservation and Attractions.

== See also ==
- List of Grevillea species
