= Grevillea crowleyae =

Conservation status
- Endangered (IUCN 3.1)

- Priority Two — Poorly Known Taxa (DEC)

Scientific classification
- Kingdom: Plantae
- Clade: Embryophytes
- Clade: Tracheophytes
- Clade: Spermatophytes
- Clade: Angiosperms
- Clade: Eudicots
- Order: Proteales
- Family: Proteaceae
- Genus: Grevillea
- Species: G. crowleyae

Binomial name
- Grevillea crowleyae Olde & Marriott

Species of shrub endemic to Western Australia

Grevillea crowleyae is a species of flowering plant in the family Proteaceae and is endemic to a restricted area in the south-west of Western Australia. It is a dense, spreading shrub with deeply divided leaves usually with three to seven linear lobes, and grey, pale yellowish or greenish flowers with a maroon-black style.

== Description ==
Grevillea corrugata is a dense, spreading shrub that typically grows to a height of 0.5–1.5 m (1 ft 8 in – 4 ft 11 in). Its leaves are 30–70 mm (1.2–2.8 in) long and deeply divided with three to seven linear lobes 10–42 mm (0.39–1.65 in) long and about 0.8 mm (0.031 in) wide. The flowers are grey, pale yellowish or greenish and arranged in groups on a rachis 20–50 mm (0.79–1.97 in) long, the pistil usually 34–38 mm (1.3–1.5 in) long and the style maroon-black, sometimes red. Flowering occurs from August to November and the fruit is a woolly-hairy, oblong follicle 13–16 mm (0.51–0.63 in) long.

== Taxonomy ==
Grevillea crowleyae was first formally described in 1993 by Peter M. Olde and Neil R. Marriott in the journal Nuytsia from specimens collected by Olde near Darkan in 1991. The specific epithet (crowleyae) honours Valma Crowley, an amateur naturalist.

== Distribution and habitat ==
This grevillea is only known about ten plants growing in a disturbed site in gravel pit in forest at the type location in the south-west of Western Australia.

== Conservation status ==
Grevillea corrugata is listed as endangered on the IUCN Red List of Threatened Species due to its restricted, severely fragmented range and the continuing decline in habitat quality and number of mature individuals. A population decline of at least half over the past 75 years is inferred due to habitat clearing for agriculture and roads.

It is also listed as priority two by the Western Australian Government Department of Biodiversity, Conservation and Attractions, meaning that it is poorly known and from only one or a few locations.

The population is estimated to be fewer than 1,000 mature individuals. It is currently declining due to threats such as land clearing and competition with invasive weeds. It is unknown how susceptible the species is to dieback, a disease caused by Phytophtora pathogens.

== See also ==
- List of Grevillea species
