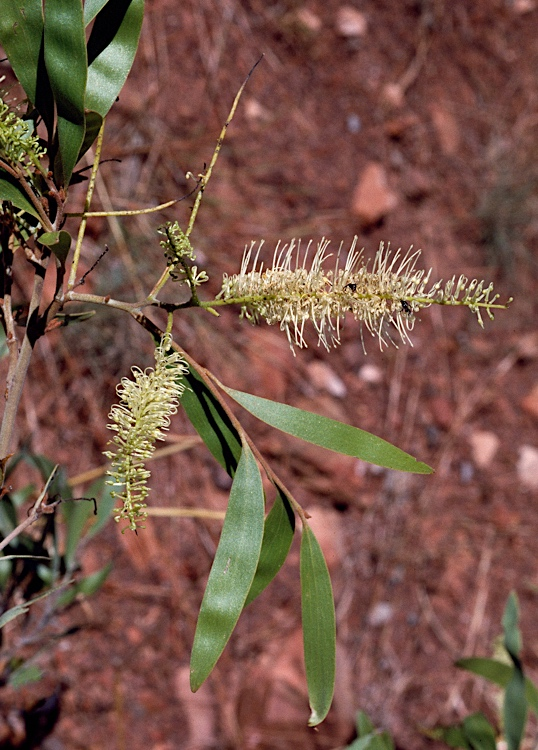

Scientific classification
- Kingdom: Plantae
- Clade: Tracheophytes
- Clade: Angiosperms
- Clade: Eudicots
- Order: Proteales
- Family: Proteaceae
- Genus: Grevillea
- Species: G. myosodes

Binomial name
- Grevillea myosodes McGill.

= Grevillea myosodes =

Species of shrub endemic to Western Australia

Grevillea myosodes is a species of flowering plant in the family Proteaceae and is endemic to north-western Australia. It is a spreading shrub with elliptic leaves and branched clusters of cream-coloured flowers.

== Description ==
Grevillea myosodes is a spreading shrub that typically grows to 1–2 m (3 ft 3 in – 6 ft 7 in) high and up to 2 m (6 ft 7 in) wide and forms a lignotuber. The leaves are obliquely elliptic, sometimes curved, 80–130 mm (3.1–5.1 in) long, 20–30 mm (0.79–1.18 in) wide and densely covered with fine silky hairs. The flowers are arranged in branched clusters, each branch cylindrical and 60–120 mm (2.4–4.7 in) long, the flowers cream-coloured to pale yellow, the pistil 10–13 mm (0.39–0.51 in) long. Flowering occurs from May to July and the fruit is a flattened, elliptic follicle 19–22 mm (0.75–0.87 in) long.

== Taxonomy ==
Grevillea myosodes was first formally described in 1986 by Donald McGillivray in his book New Names in Grevillea (Proteaceae) from specimens collected by Michael Lazarides in 1959. The specific epithet (myosodes) means "mouse odour" referring to the scent of the flowers.

== Distribution and habitat ==
This grevillea grows in woodland or sharubland in the east Kimberley region of Western Australia and in the Top End of the Northern Territory.

== Conservation status ==
Grevillea myosodes is listed as not threatened by the Western Australian Government Department of Biodiversity, Conservation and Attractions, but as near threatened under the Northern Territory Government Territory Parks and Wildlife Conservation Act.

== See also ==
- List of Grevillea species
