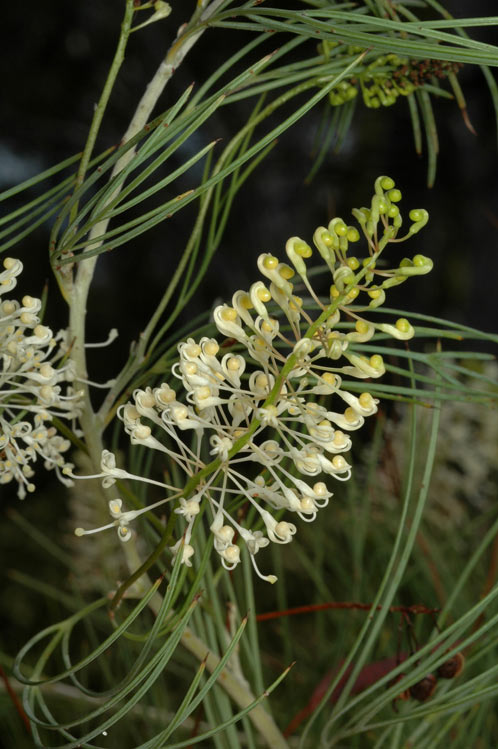
- In the Australian National Botanic Gardens

Scientific classification
- Kingdom: Plantae
- Clade: Tracheophytes
- Clade: Angiosperms
- Clade: Eudicots
- Order: Proteales
- Family: Proteaceae
- Genus: Grevillea
- Species: G. zygoloba

Binomial name
- Grevillea zygoloba Olde & Marriott

= Grevillea zygoloba =

Species of shrub endemic to Western Australia

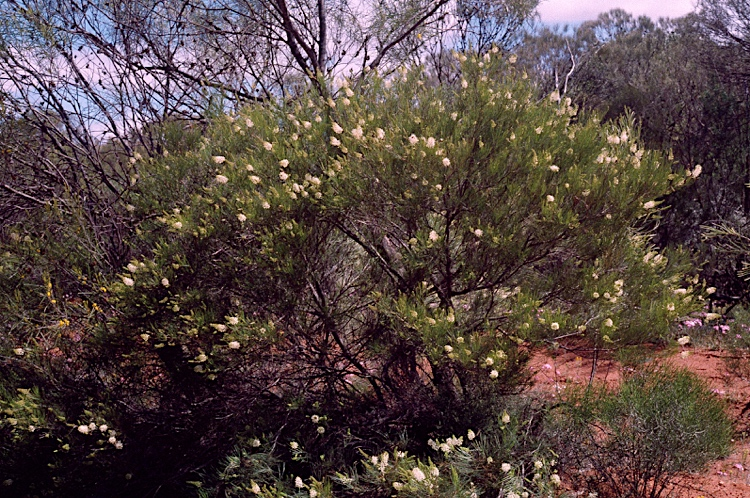
Habit near Southern Cross

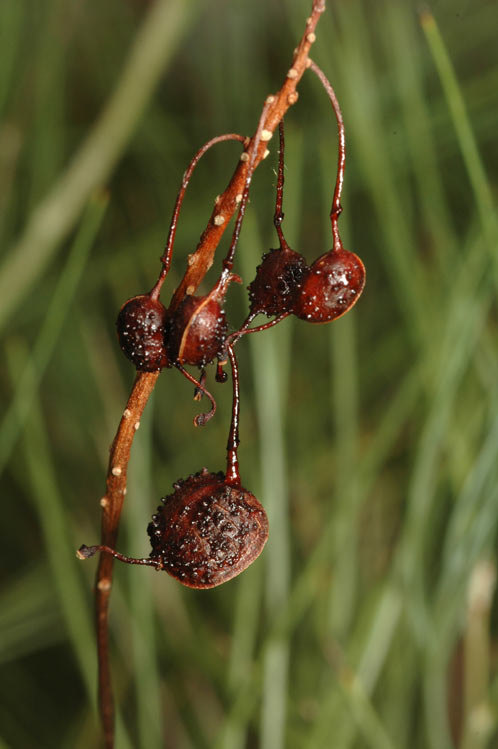
Fruit

Grevillea zygoloba is a species of flowering plant in the family Proteaceae and is endemic to the south-west of Western Australia. It is an erect shrub with divided leaves, the lobes linear and more or less parallel, and clusters of creamy-white flowers.

== Description ==
Grevillea zygoloba is an erect shrub that typically grows to a height of up to 2 m (6 ft 7 in) and has erect, glaucous branchlets. Its leaves are 50–80 mm (2.0–3.1 in) long and divided with usually 3 to 7, more or less parallel lobes sometimes divided again, the end lobes linear, 30–50 mm (1.2–2.0 in) long and 0.7–1.0 mm (0.028–0.039 in) wide. The edges of the leaves are rolled under, usually concealing the lower surface apart from the mid-vein. The flowers are arranged in leaf axils and on the ends of branches in sometimes branched clusters, the end clusters cylindrical to conical on a rachis 20–40 mm (0.79–1.57 in) long, the flowers nearer the base of the rachis opening first. The flowers are creamy-white, the pistil 6.5–7.5 mm (0.26–0.30 in) long. Flowering occurs from September to November and the fruit is a sticky, pimply, elliptic follicle 5–7 mm (0.20–0.28 in) long.

== Taxonomy ==
Grevillea zygoloba was first described in 1994 by the botanists Peter Olde and Neil Marriott in the Grevillea Book from specimens collected by Olde near Bungalbin Hill near Southern Cross. The specific epithet (zygoloba) means "joined-leaved", referring to the pinnate leaves.

== Distribution ==
This grevillea grows in woodland and scrubland on and among ironstone hills, in stony and loamy soils. It occurs between Koolyanobbing and the Die Hardy Range north of Southern Cross in the Avon Wheatbelt, Coolgardie, Nullarbor and Yalgoo bioregions of south-western Western Australia.

== Conservation status ==
Grevillea zygoloba is listed as "not threatened" by the Government of Western Australia Department of Biodiversity, Conservation and Attractions.

== See also ==
- List of Grevillea species
