= Grevillea prominens =

Conservation status
- Priority Three — Poorly Known Taxa (DEC)

Scientific classification
- Kingdom: Plantae
- Clade: Tracheophytes
- Clade: Angiosperms
- Clade: Eudicots
- Order: Proteales
- Family: Proteaceae
- Genus: Grevillea
- Species: G. prominens

Binomial name
- Grevillea prominens Olde & Marriott

Synonyms
- Grevillea trifida 'long-inflorescence form'

Species of shrub endemic to Western Australia

Grevillea prominens is a species of flowering plant in the family Proteaceae and is endemic to a restricted part of the South West region of Western Australia. It is a shrub with divided leaves, the end-lobes linear to narrow triangular, and creamy-white flowers usually projected beyond the foliage.

== Description ==
Grevillea prominens is a shrub that typically grows to a height of 0.5–2 m (1 ft 8 in – 6 ft 7 in) and has glabrous branchlets. The leaves are 30–45 mm (1.2–1.8 in) long and divided with three lobes, each usually divided again with a further three lobes, the end lobes linear to narrow triangular, 4–22 mm (0.16–0.87 in) long and 0.6–2 mm (0.024–0.079 in) wide with the edges rolled under. The flowers are arranged on the ends of branchlets, in usually branched clusters, usually beyond the foliage, more or less on one side of a glabrous rachis 10–30 mm (0.39–1.18 in) long. The flowers are creamy-white, the pistil 45–55 mm (1.8–2.2 in) long. Flowering mainly occurs in September and October and the fruit is an egg-shaped follicle 5–10 mm (0.20–0.39 in) long.

== Taxonomy ==
Grevillea prominens was first formally described in 1993 by Peter Olde and Neil Marriott in the journal Nuytsia from specimens collected near Harvey in 1991. The specific epithet (prominens) means "prominent", referring to the flowers held conspicuously above the foliage.

== Distribution and habitat ==
This grevillea grows in forest along creek lines and is only known from a few locations near Harvey in the Jarrah Forest bioregion of south-western Western Australia.

== Conservation status ==
Grevillea prominens is listed as "Priority Three" by the Government of Western Australia Department of Biodiversity, Conservation and Attractions, meaning that it is poorly known and known from only a few locations but is not under imminent threat.

== See also ==
- List of Grevillea species
