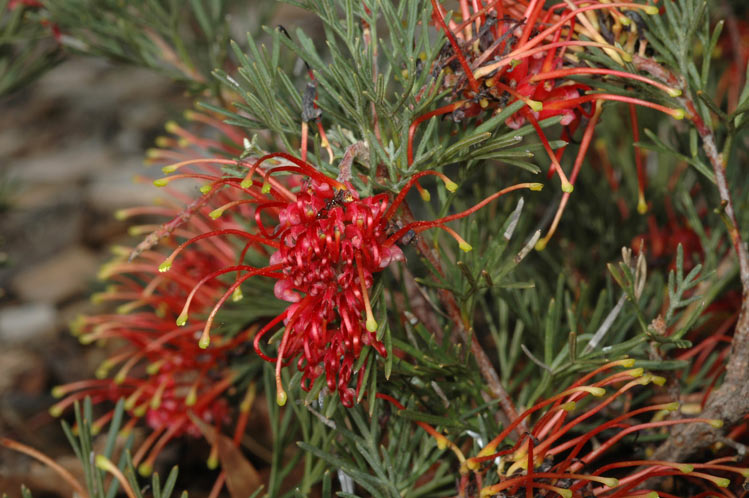

Conservation status
- Least Concern (IUCN 3.1)

- Priority Two — Poorly Known Taxa (DEC)

Scientific classification
- Kingdom: Plantae
- Clade: Embryophytes
- Clade: Tracheophytes
- Clade: Spermatophytes
- Clade: Angiosperms
- Clade: Eudicots
- Order: Proteales
- Family: Proteaceae
- Genus: Grevillea
- Species: G. delta

Binomial name
- Grevillea delta (McGill.) Olde & Marriott

Synonyms
- Grevillea thelemanniana subsp. delta McGill.

= Grevillea delta =

Species of shrub native to Western Australia

Grevillea delta is a species of flowering plant in the family Proteaceae and is endemic to restricted area in the south-west of Western Australia. It is a bushy, spreading shrub with hairy branchlets, divided leaves with linear lobes, and groups of red flowers with a red, green-tipped style.

== Description ==
Grevillea delta is a bushy, spreading shrub that typically grows to a height of 0.3–1.8 m (1 ft 0 in – 5 ft 11 in) and has its branchlets covered with shaggy hairs. Its leaves are divided, the leaflets sometimes divided again, the ultimate lobes linear, 1.5–12 mm (0.059–0.472 in) long and 0.3–0.8 mm (0.012–0.031 in) wide with the edges rolled under, enclosing most of the lower surface except for the mid-vein. The flowers are arranged in groups of twelve to twenty, 20–40 mm (0.79–1.57 in) long on a woolly-hairy rachis 8–15 mm (0.31–0.59 in) long. The flowers are red with a green-tipped style, the pistil about 27 mm (1.1 in) long. Flowering occurs from July to October and the fruit is a narrow oblong follicle 10–12 mm (0.39–0.47 in) long with a conspicuous ridge.

== Taxonomy ==
This grevillea was first formally described in 1986 by Donald McGillivray who gave it the name Grevillea thelemanniana subsp. delta in his book New names in Grevillea (Proteaceae) from specimens collected by Alex George near Mount Lesueur in 1974. In 1994 Peter M. Olde and Neil R. Marriott raised the subspecies to species status as Grevillea delta.

The specific epithet (delta) is a Greek letter, since the species was first referred to as 'Race G' of subspecies thelemanniana.

== Distribution and habitat ==
This grevillea grows in mallee heath near creeks or in low-lying areas and is only known from near the type location.

== Conservation status ==
Grevillea delta is listed as priority two by the Western Australian Government Department of Biodiversity, Conservation and Attractions, meaning that it is poorly known and from only one or a few locations.

== See also ==
- List of Grevillea species
