= Grevillea elongata =

Conservation status
- Endangered (IUCN 3.1)

- Vulnerable (EPBC Act)

Scientific classification
- Kingdom: Plantae
- Clade: Embryophytes
- Clade: Tracheophytes
- Clade: Spermatophytes
- Clade: Angiosperms
- Clade: Eudicots
- Order: Proteales
- Family: Proteaceae
- Genus: Grevillea
- Species: G. elongata

Binomial name
- Grevillea elongata Olde & Marriott

Species of shrub native to Western Australia

Grevillea elongata, also known as Ironstone grevillea, is a species of flowering plant in the family Proteaceae and is endemic to the south-west of Western Australia. It is a shrub with divided leaves with sharply-pointed linear lobes, and conical or cylindrical groups of white flowers.

== Description ==
Grevillea elongata is a shrub that typically grows to a height of 1.5–2 m (4 ft 11 in – 6 ft 7 in) with more or less glabrous branchlets. The leaves are 25–50 mm (0.98–1.97 in) long with three linear, sharply-pointed lobes 5–30 mm (0.20–1.18 in) long and about 0.8 mm (0.031 in) wide, the lobes often further divided. The flowers are arranged in conical to cylindrical groups on a hairy rachis, each flower on a pedicel 2.2–3.2 mm (0.087–0.126 in) long with bracts 2.8–3.4 mm (0.11–0.13 in) long at the base. The flowers are white, the pistil 3.5–4.5 mm (0.14–0.18 in) long. Flowering occurs from October to December and the fruit is an oblong follicle about 8 mm (0.31 in) long.

== Taxonomy ==
Grevillea elongata was first formally described in 1994 by Peter M. Olde and Neil R. Marriott in The Grevillea Book from specimens collected by Olde near Ruabon in 1991. The specific epithet (elongata) means "lengthened".

== Distribution and habitat ==
Ironstone grevillea grows in heath, often near creeks and is restricted to an area near Busselton and Ruabon in the Swan Coastal Plain biogeographic region of south-western Western Australia.

== Conservation status ==
Grevillea elongata is listed as endangered on the IUCN Red List of Threatened Species and under the Biodiversity Conservation Act 2016 in Western Australia. It is also listed as vulnerable under the Australian Government Environment Protection and Biodiversity Conservation Act 1999 and as threatened by the Western Australian Government Department of Biodiversity, Conservation and Attractions, meaning that it is in danger of extinction. The main threats to the species are weed invasion, grazing by rabbits, and habitat loss and disturbance.

== See also ==
- List of Grevillea species
