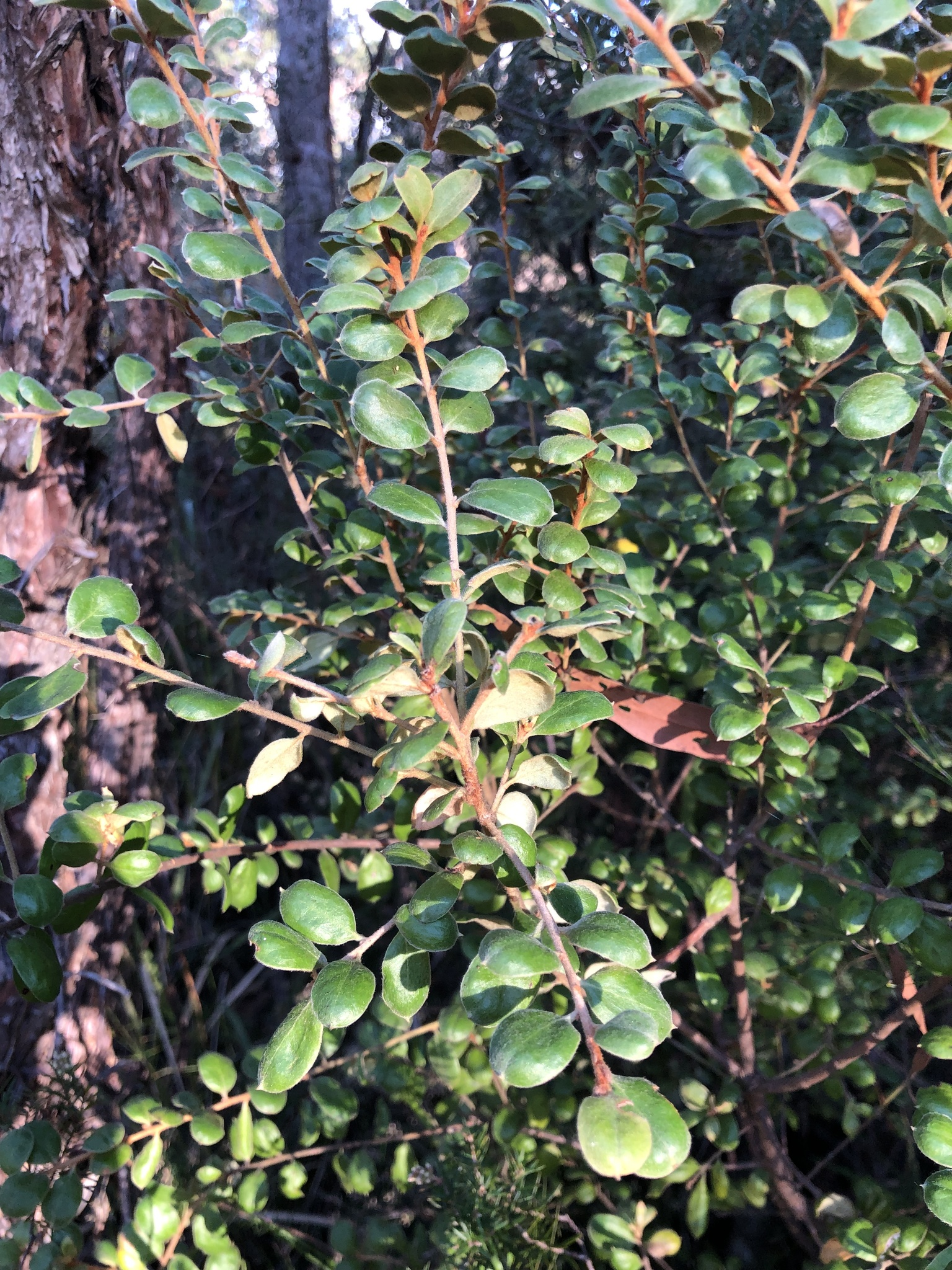

Conservation status
- Vulnerable (EPBC Act)

Scientific classification
- Kingdom: Plantae
- Clade: Tracheophytes
- Clade: Angiosperms
- Clade: Eudicots
- Order: Proteales
- Family: Proteaceae
- Genus: Grevillea
- Species: G. rhizomatosa

Binomial name
- Grevillea rhizomatosa Olde & Marriott

= Grevillea rhizomatosa =

Species of shrub endemic to Australia

Grevillea rhizomatosa, commonly known as Gibraltar grevillea, is a species of flowering plant in the family Proteaceae and is endemic to a restricted area of north-eastern New South Wales. It is a spreading, bushy shrub with egg-shaped to almost round leaves and small clusters of green and pinkish-red flowers.

== Description ==
Grevillea rhizomatosa is a spreading, bushy shrub that typically grows to 0.3–1 m (1 ft 0 in – 3 ft 3 in) high and forms root suckers. The leaves are egg-shaped with the narrower end towards the base, to oblong, 7–27 mm (0.28–1.06 in) long and 7–12 mm (0.28–0.47 in) wide. The upper surface of the leaves is concave and the lower surface is densely hairy. The flowers are arranged singly or in groups of 2 to 4 on the ends of branches on a hairy rachis 2–3 mm (0.079–0.118 in) long. The flowers are green at the base, pinkish red at the tip, often purplish black in the middle with a green style, the pistil 23–25 mm (0.91–0.98 in) long. Flowering mainly occurs from September to December but the plant is not known to set fruit or seed.

== Taxonomy ==
Grevillea rhizomatosa was first formally described in 1994 by Peter Olde and Neil Marriott in the journal Telopea from specimens collected by Olde in the Gibraltar Range National Park in 1992. The specific epithet (rhizomatosa) means "bearing a rhizome", referring to the species' root-suckering habit.

== Distribution and habitat ==
Gibraltar grevillea grows in densely shrubby forest on sandy soil, usually near creeks, and is endemic to the Gibraltar Range National Park.

== Conservation status ==
Grevillea rhizomatosa is listed as "vulnerable" under the Australian Government Environment Protection and Biodiversity Conservation Act 1999 and the New South Wales Government Biodiversity Conservation Act 2016. The threats to the species include its small population size, inappropriate fire regimes, trampling by people, and track maintenance.
