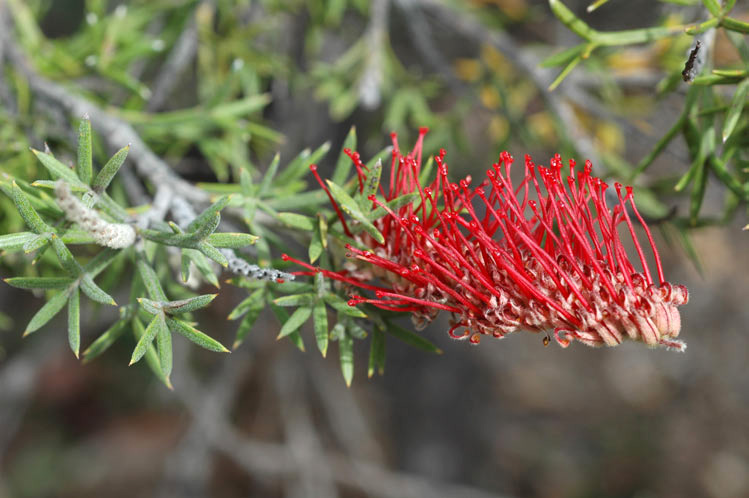

Scientific classification
- Kingdom: Plantae
- Clade: Tracheophytes
- Clade: Angiosperms
- Clade: Eudicots
- Order: Proteales
- Family: Proteaceae
- Genus: Grevillea
- Species: G. neorigida

Binomial name
- Grevillea neorigida I.M.Turner

Synonyms
- Grevillesa rigida Olde & Marriott nom.illeg.

= Grevillea neorigida =

Species of plant endemic to Australia

Grevillea neorigida is a species of flowering plant in the family Proteaceae and is endemic to Western Australia. It is compact, spreading shrub with deeply-divided leaves, the end lobes linear and somewhat sharply-pointed, and clusters of creamy-brown to off-white flowers with a scarlet or orange-red style.

== Description ==
Grevillea neorigida is a compact, spreading shrub that typically grows to a height of up to 1.5–3 m (4 ft 11 in – 9 ft 10 in). Its leaves are 30–60 mm (1.2–2.4 in) long in outline but deeply divided with 3 to 9 linear lobes 5–35 mm (0.20–1.38 in) long and 1.3–2.5 mm (0.051–0.098 in) wide and somewhat sharply-pointed, with the edges rolled under, obscuring most of the lower surface. The flowers are arranged in clusters on one side of a rachis 45–95 mm (1.8–3.7 in) long. The flowers are creamy-brown to off-white, the style scarlet to orange-red and woolly- to shaggy-hairy on the outside, the pistil 22–25 mm (0.87–0.98 in) long. Flowering time depends on subspecies, and the fruit is a silky-hairy follicle 10–15 mm (0.39–0.59 in) long.

== Taxonomy ==
In 1994 Peter Olde and Neil Marriott described Grevillea rigida in The Grevillea Book from specimens collected east of Ravensthorpe in 1986, but the name was illegitimate because it had already been used for a fossil species. In 2014, Ian Mark Turner changed the name to Grevillea neorigida in Annales Botanici Fennici.

In the same publication, Olde and Marriott described two subspecies of G. rigida, and Turner has legitimised the names that are accepted by the Australian Plant Census:

- Grevillea neorigida subsp. distans (Olde & Marriott) I.M.Turner has leaves 30–60 mm (1.2–2.4 in) long, usually with 7 to 9 lobes 15–45 mm (0.59–1.77 in) long and 1.3–1.9 mm (0.051–0.075 in) wide and mainly flowers from August to March.
- Grevillea neorigida I.M.Turner subsp. neorigida has leaves 20–45 mm (0.79–1.77 in) long, usually with 2 to 5 lobes 5–20 mm (0.20–0.79 in) long and 1.3–2.5 mm (0.051–0.098 in) wide and mainly flowers from August to November, sometimes in other months. The specific epithet (rigida) means "hard" or "stiff" and neorigida refers to this being the new name for G. rigida.

== Distribution and habitat ==
Grevillea neorigida grows in mallee-heath and tall shrubland on granitic loam soils in the Esperance Plains and Mallee bioregions of south-western Western Australia. Subspecies distans occurs from the Fitzgerald River National Park and north almost to Ravensthorpe and west to Jerramungup and subsp. rigida mainly north and north-east of Ravensthorpe.

== Conservation status ==
Both subspecies of G. neorigida are listed as "not threatened" by the Government of Western Australia Department of Biodiversity, Conservation and Attractions.
