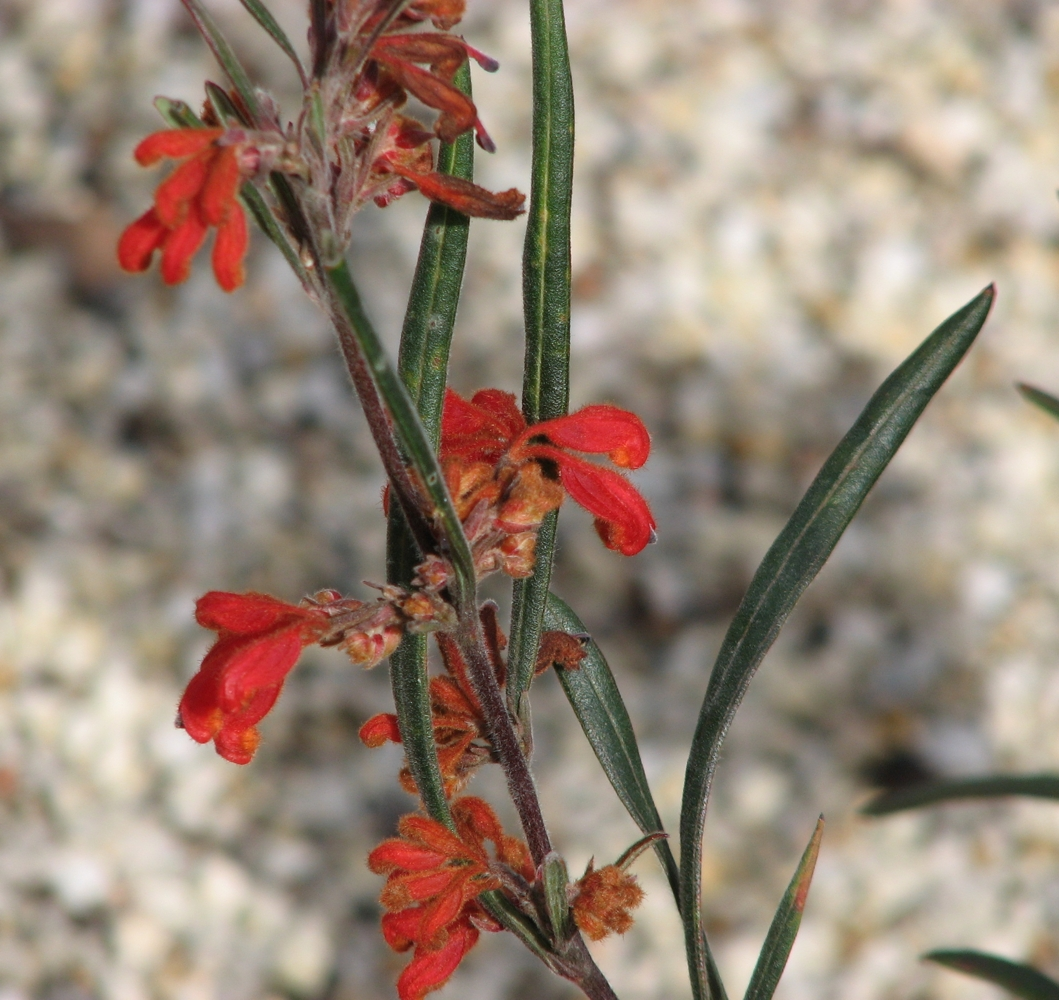
- In Maranoa Gardens

Conservation status
- Least Concern (IUCN 3.1)

- Priority Three — Poorly Known Taxa (DEC)

Scientific classification
- Kingdom: Plantae
- Clade: Embryophytes
- Clade: Tracheophytes
- Clade: Spermatophytes
- Clade: Angiosperms
- Clade: Eudicots
- Order: Proteales
- Family: Proteaceae
- Genus: Grevillea
- Species: G. bronweniae

Binomial name
- Grevillea bronweniae Keighery

= Grevillea bronweniae =

Species of shrub endemic to Western Australia

Grevillea bronweniae is a species of flowering plant in the family Proteaceae and is endemic to the south-west of Western Australia. It is an erect shrub usually with more or less linear leaves, and wheel-like clusters of crimson flowers.

== Description ==
Grevillea bronweniae is an erect shrub that typically grows to a height of 1.0 to 1.8 metres (3.3 to 5.9 ft). The leaves are linear to narrowly elliptic with the narrower end towards the base, 10 to 160 millimetres (0.4 to 6.3 in) long and 2 to 14 millimetres (0.08 to 0.55 in) wide with the edges curved down or rolled under. The flowers are arranged in wheel-like clusters in leaf axils and at the ends of stems, on a rachis 0.5–2.0 mm (0.020–0.079 in) long, and are scarlet. The pistil is 8–12 mm (0.31–0.47 in) long and hairy. Flowering occurs from June to November and the fruit is a woolly-hairy, narrow oval follicle about 15 mm (0.59 in) long.

== Taxonomy ==
Grevillea bronweniae was first formally described by botanist Gregory John Keighery in Nuytsia in 1990. The specific epithet (bronweniae) honours Keighery's wife and botanist, Bronwen Keighery.

== Distribution and habitat ==
This grevillea grows in low woodland between Nannup and Busselton in the Jarrah Forest and Swan Coastal Plain biogeographic regions of south-western Western Australia.

== Conservation status ==
Grevillea bronweniae is listed as priority three by the Government of Western Australia Department of Biodiversity, Conservation and Attractions, meaning that it is poorly known and known from only a few locations but is not under imminent threat.
