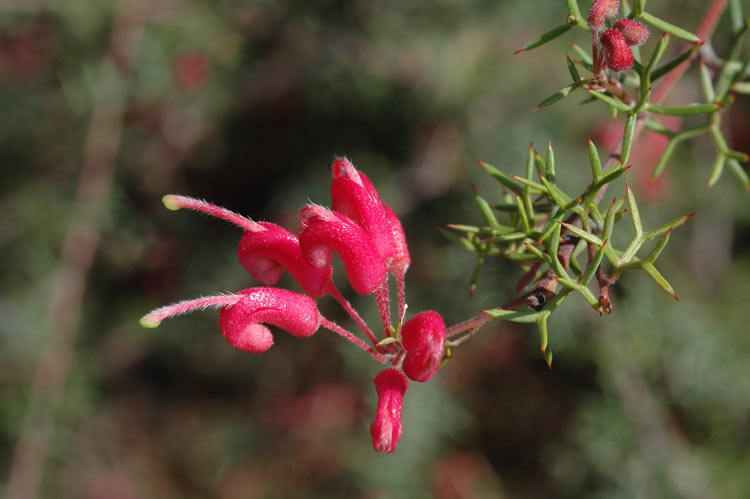
- In the Australian National Botanic Gardens

Conservation status
- Data Deficient (IUCN 3.1)

- Priority Four — Rare Taxa (DEC)

Scientific classification
- Kingdom: Plantae
- Clade: Tracheophytes
- Clade: Angiosperms
- Clade: Eudicots
- Order: Proteales
- Family: Proteaceae
- Genus: Grevillea
- Species: G. neodissecta

Binomial name
- Grevillea neodissecta I.M.Turner

Synonyms
- Grevillea dissecta (McGill.) Olde & Marriott nom.illeg.; Grevillea pilosa subsp. dissecta McGill.

= Grevillea neodissecta =

Species of plant endemic to Australia

Grevillea neodissecta is a species of flowering plant in the family Proteaceae and is endemic to Western Australia. It is low, dense shrub with deeply divided leaves, the end lobes linear and sharply pointed, and small clusters of rose pink and white to cream-coloured flowers with a pinkish-red style.

== Description ==
Grevillea neodissecta is a low, dense shrub that typically grows to a height of up to 1 m (3 ft 3 in). Its leaves are 10–20 mm (0.39–0.79 in) long and 20–40 mm (0.79–1.57 in) wide in outline but deeply divided with 3 to 9 lobes that are usually divided again into 3, the end lobes linear or tapering, sharply-pointed, 7–15 mm (0.28–0.59 in) long and 1.0–1.5 mm (0.039–0.059 in) wide with the edges rolled under, obscuring most of the lower surface. The flowers are arranged in loose clusters on the ends of branches on a rachis 2–7 mm (0.079–0.276 in) long, and are rose pink and white to cream-coloured, the style pinkish red with a few shaggy hairs, the pistil 18–20 mm (0.71–0.79 in) long. Flowering occurs from September to February, and the fruit is a follicle 10–12 mm (0.39–0.47 in) long.

== Taxonomy ==
This grevillea was first formally described in 1986 by Donald McGillivray who gave it the name Grevillea pilosa subsp. dissecta in his book New names in Grevillea (Proteaceae). In 1993, Peter Olde and Neil Marriott raised the subspecies to species status as Grevillea dissecta, but the name was illegitimate because it had already been used for a fossil species. In 2014, Ian Mark Turner changed the name to Grevillea neodissecta in Annales Botanici Fennici. The specific epithet (dissecta) means "deeply-divided" and neodissecta refers to this being the new name for G. dissecta.

== Distribution and habitat ==
Grevillea neodissecta occurs in the Coolgardie bioregion of Southwest Australia, where it grows in mallee shrubland and heath on sandy and clay loam soils.
