= Grevillea meisneri =

Conservation status
- Least Concern (IUCN 3.1)

Scientific classification
- Kingdom: Plantae
- Clade: Tracheophytes
- Clade: Angiosperms
- Clade: Eudicots
- Order: Proteales
- Family: Proteaceae
- Genus: Grevillea
- Species: G. meisneri

Binomial name
- Grevillea meisneri Montrouz.

Synonyms
- Hakea meisneri (Montrouz.) Christenh. & Byng

Species of shrub endemic to New Caledonia

Grevillea meisneri is a shrub in the family Proteaceae. It is endemic to New Caledonia. It is a manganese accumulator.

The species name honors botanist Carl Meissner.

== Description ==
Grevillea meisneri grows up to 7 metres (23 ft) in height.
