= Grevillea pieroniae =

Scientific classification
- Kingdom: Plantae
- Clade: Tracheophytes
- Clade: Angiosperms
- Clade: Eudicots
- Order: Proteales
- Family: Proteaceae
- Genus: Grevillea
- Species: G. pieroniae

Binomial name
- Grevillea pieroniae Olde, 2020

Species of plant endemic to Australia

Grevillea pieroniae is a species of plant in the protea family that is endemic to Australia.

== Etymology ==
The specific epithet pieroniae honours botanical artist and author Margaret Pieroni for her advancement of knowledge of the flora of Australia.

== Description ==
The species is an erect, wispy shrub that grows to a height of 0.5–1.5 m (1 ft 8 in – 4 ft 11 in) and a width of about 1 m (3 ft 3 in). Its white flowers appear in axillary conflorescences. It flowers from mid-winter until spring, fruiting in late spring.

== Distribution and habitat ==
The species occurs in the Stirling Range National Park in the Esperance Plains IBRA bioregion, in south-west Western Australia. It grows near watercourses and areas of impeded drainage in marri-jarrah woodland and proteaceous heath shrubland.
