= Grevillea dunlopii =

Conservation status
- Least Concern (IUCN 3.1)

Scientific classification
- Kingdom: Plantae
- Clade: Embryophytes
- Clade: Tracheophytes
- Clade: Spermatophytes
- Clade: Angiosperms
- Clade: Eudicots
- Order: Proteales
- Family: Proteaceae
- Genus: Grevillea
- Species: G. dunlopii

Binomial name
- Grevillea dunlopii Makinson

Species of plant endemic to Australia

Grevillea dunlopii is a species of flowering plant in the family Proteaceae and is endemic to the northern part of the Northern Territory. It is a spreading shrub with divided leaves with nine to seventeen spreading lobes, and pale cream-coloured to white flowers.

== Description ==
Grevillea dunlopii is a spreading shrub that typically grows to a height of 0.5–2 m (1 ft 8 in – 6 ft 7 in). Its leaves are 40–60 mm (1.6–2.4 in) long and divided with nine to seventeen spreading linear to narrowly elliptic lobes 20–50 mm (0.79–1.97 in) long and 1.8–4 mm (0.071–0.157 in) wide. The upper surface of the leaves is covered with woolly hairs but the lower surface is mostly obscured. The flowers are arranged in groups at the ends of branchlets on a rachis 80–150 mm (3.1–5.9 in) long, pale cream-coloured to white, the pistil 6–8 mm (0.24–0.31 in) long and hairy. Flowering occurs from December to May and the fruit is a hairy follicle 8–10 mm (0.31–0.39 in) long.

== Taxonomy ==
Grevillea dunlopii was first formally described in 2000 by Robert Owen Makinson in the Flora of Australia, based on plant material collected near Mount Gilruth in 1978. The specific epithet (dunlopii) honours Clyde Dunlop who collected the type specimens and was curator of the Northern Territory Herbarium.

== Distribution and habitat ==
This grevillea grows on sandstone escarpments, often near watercourse or in shallow sand in Kakadu National Park and western Arnhem Land.

== Conservation status ==
Although the species is locally uncommon and has a restricted distribution, Grevillea dunlopii is listed as least concern on the IUCN Red List of Threatened Species, as it is presumed to have a stable population and faces no major threats, either at present or in the near future.
