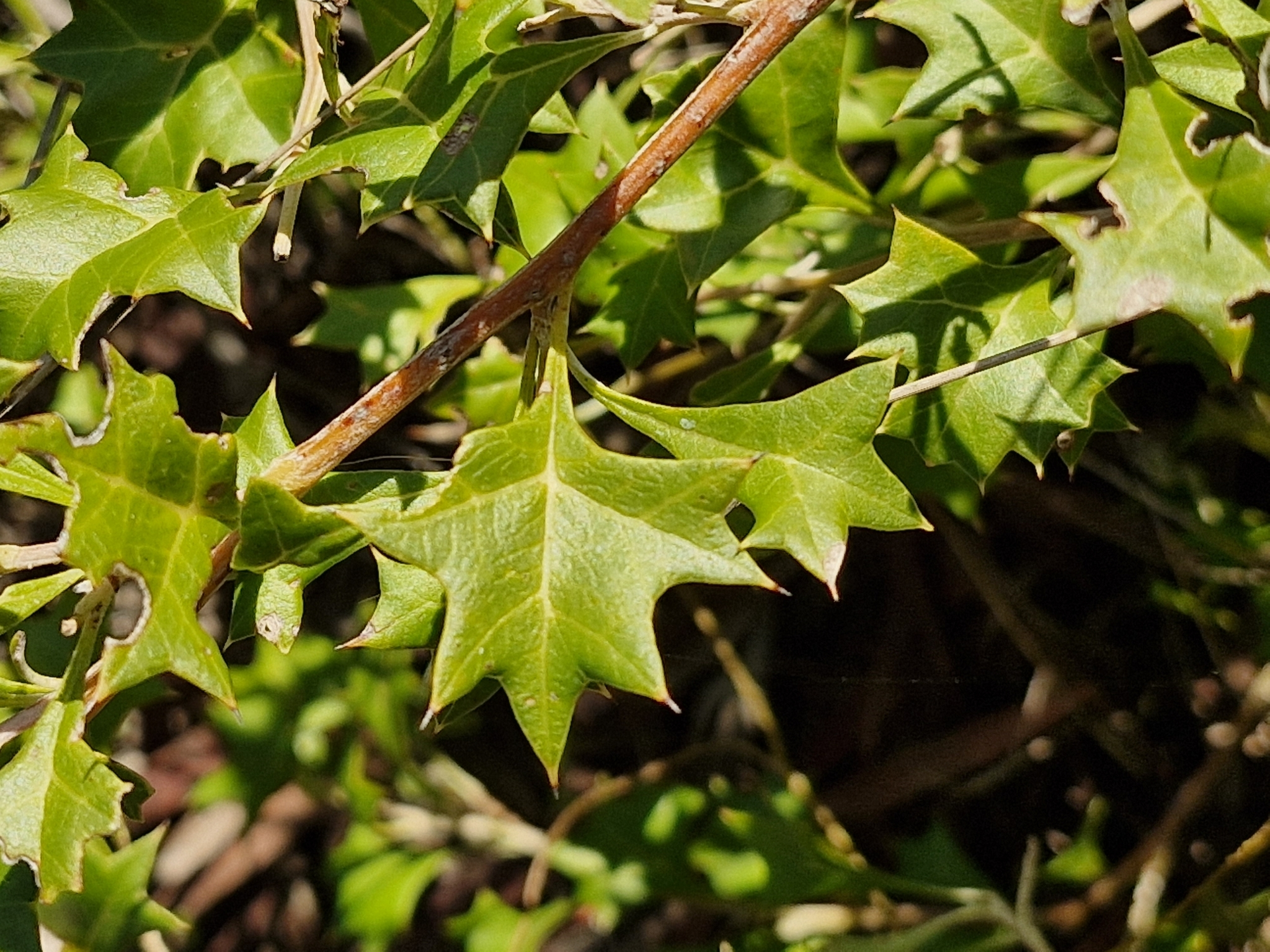

Conservation status
- Vulnerable (IUCN 3.1)

Scientific classification
- Kingdom: Plantae
- Clade: Embryophytes
- Clade: Tracheophytes
- Clade: Spermatophytes
- Clade: Angiosperms
- Clade: Eudicots
- Order: Proteales
- Family: Proteaceae
- Genus: Grevillea
- Species: G. dilatata

Binomial name
- Grevillea dilatata (R.Br.) Downing, 2004

Synonyms
- Grevillea ilicifolia var. dilatata R.Br., 1830

= Grevillea dilatata =

Species of plant endemic to Australia

Grevillea dilatata is a species of plant in the protea family that is endemic to Australia. It is native to south-eastern South Australia, including Kangaroo Island as well as the Eyre and Yorke Peninsulas.

== Description ==
Grevillea dilatata is a shrub that grows up to 0.3–2 metres (0.98–6.56 ft) tall and up to 3 metres (9.8 ft) across. Leaves appear 'fan-shaped' with margins appearing more 'toothed' than lobed and noticeably pungent. The upper surface of the leaf is either glabrous or with sparse indumentum. The lower surface is always covered in subsericious (straight, silky) hairs.

== Taxonomy ==
This species was once considered part of Grevillea ilicifolia, where it was known as Grevillea ilicifolia var. dilatata. A morphological study published in 2004 resulted in G. ilicifolia being separated into three species and four subspecies. The specific epithet (dilatata) is a Latin word meaning "expanded" or "widened". In some publications, it is still referred to as Grevillea ilicifolia var. dilatata.

== Distribution and habitat ==
This species can be found in mallee, heath and shrubland habitats in south-eastern South Australia, including the Yorke and Eyre peninsulas and Kangaroo Island.

== Conservation status ==
Grevillea dilatata is listed as vulnerable on the IUCN Red List of Threatened Species, as it has lost 30% of its habitat from the 1980s to now due to land clearing for agriculture. It is currently threatened by habitat loss and fragmentation for agriculture and competition with invasive weeds. The population is likely to be currently stable and it appears to be locally common within its distribution.
