= Grevillea williamsonii =

Scientific classification
- Kingdom: Plantae
- Clade: Tracheophytes
- Clade: Angiosperms
- Clade: Eudicots
- Order: Proteales
- Family: Proteaceae
- Genus: Grevillea
- Species: G. williamsonii

Binomial name
- Grevillea williamsonii F.Muell.

Species of shrub endemic to Victoria, Australia

Grevillea williamsonii, also known as Williamson's Grevillea, is a shrub which is endemic to a restricted area in the Grampians Ranges in western Victoria. It was first described from a single plant in 1893, which was destroyed by bushfire four years later. It was then feared extinct and went unrecorded until 1992, where 12 plants were found. The taxonomic validity of this grevillea has been disputed, and many sources treat it as synonymous with G. aquifolium.

== Description ==
Grevillea williamsoni is a spreading shrub that grows 0.6–1 m tall. Leaves are elliptic to narrow, 1.5–4.0 cm long, 3–8 mm wide, entire or (occasionally on adults, commonly on juveniles) with 2–4 spreading triangular teeth; margins shortly and angularly refracted; lower surface subsericeous to subvillous with straight hairs. The perianth is lime-green becoming yellowish; style pale orange yellow becoming pale pink at about anthesis then darker reddish pink. Flowering occurs August–October.

== Taxonomy ==
Grevillea williamsonii was first described in 1893. It is named after its discoverer, H.B. Williamson.

Many sources, including the National Herbarium of Victoria and the Australian Plant Census treat G. williamsonii as synononymous with G. aquifolium, with recent studies suggesting it is a sterile variant.

== Distribution and habitat ==
The species is known only from a single area in the Grampians Ranges in western Victoria.
