= Grevillea glabrescens =

Conservation status
- Least Concern (IUCN 3.1)

Scientific classification
- Kingdom: Plantae
- Clade: Embryophytes
- Clade: Tracheophytes
- Clade: Angiosperms
- Clade: Eudicots
- Order: Proteales
- Family: Proteaceae
- Genus: Grevillea
- Species: G. glabrescens

Binomial name
- Grevillea glabrescens Olde & Marriott

Species of shrub endemic to Australia

Grevillea glabrescens is a species of flowering plant in the family Proteaceae and is endemic to the Northern Territory. It is an open, erect shrub with oblong leaves that have triangular teeth or lobes on the edges, and clusters of white to cream-coloured or very pale yellow flowers.

== Description ==
Grevillea glabrescens is an open, erect shrub, that typically grows to a height of 1–2.5 m (3 ft 3 in – 8 ft 2 in). Its leaves are oblong in outline, 65–130 mm (2.6–5.1 in) long and 10–40 mm (0.39–1.57 in) wide with five to eleven triangular teeth or lobes on the edges, both sides of the leaves more or less glabrous. The flowers are arranged in leaf axils or on the ends of branches in sometimes branched, conical groups, on a rachis 20–40 mm (0.79–1.57 in) long. The flower buds are green, becoming white to cream-coloured or very pale yellow and fragrant flowers, the pistil 15–20 mm (0.59–0.79 in) long. Flowering mainly occurs from May to July and the fruit is an elliptic, glabrous follicle 14–16 mm (0.55–0.63 in) long.

== Taxonomy ==
Grevillea glabrescens was first formally described in 1993 by Peter M. Olde and Neil R. Marriott in the journal Telopea from specimens collected near El Sharana in Kakadu National Park in 1990. The specific epithet (glabrescens) means "becoming glabrous", referring to the leaves and branchlets.

== Distribution and habitat ==
This grevillea grows in low heath in shallow sandy soil and in rock crevices at or near the top of escarpments in Kakadu and Nitmiluk National Parks.

== Conservation status ==
Grevillea glabrescens is listed as least concern on the IUCN Red List of Threatened Species and under the Northern Territory Government Territory Parks and Wildlife Conservation Act 1976. Despite its restricted distribution, this species does not currently face any major threats and its population appears stable. As most of the species' population occurs within Kakadu National Park, a protected area, no additional conservation measures are necessary.
