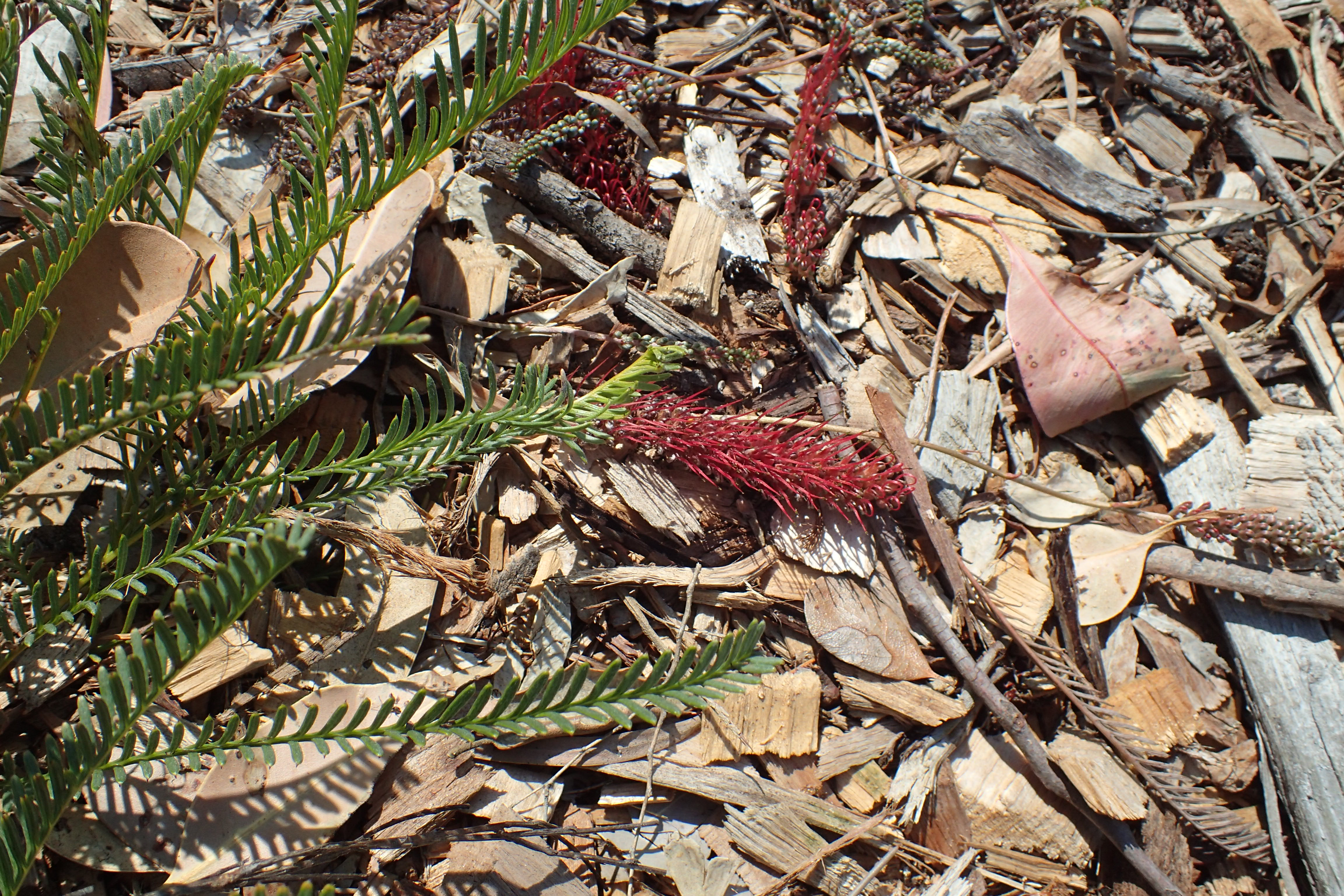
- Grevillea dryandroides in Kings Park Botanic Garden

Conservation status
- Endangered (IUCN 3.1)

- Endangered (EPBC Act)

Scientific classification
- Kingdom: Plantae
- Clade: Tracheophytes
- Clade: Angiosperms
- Clade: Eudicots
- Order: Proteales
- Family: Proteaceae
- Genus: Grevillea
- Species: G. dryandroides

Binomial name
- Grevillea dryandroides C.A.Gardner

= Grevillea dryandroides =

Species of shrub native to Western Australia

Grevillea dryandroides, commonly known as phalanx grevillea, is a species of flowering plant in the family Proteaceae and is endemic to the south-west of Western Australia. A diffuse, clumping shrub, it often forms suckers and has divided leaves with up to 35 pairs of leaflets, and groups of red to pinkish flowers on an unusually long, trailing peduncle.

== Description ==
Grevillea dryandroides is a diffuse, clumping shrub that typically grows to a height of 10–50 cm (3.9–19.7 in) and often forms suckers. The leaves are divided, usually 70–140 mm (2.8–5.5 in) long with ten to thirty-five pairs of spreading, linear to narrow egg-shaped lobes with the narrower end towards the base, the lobes 6–16 mm (0.24–0.63 in) long and 1.2–2.0 mm (0.047–0.079 in) wide. The flowers are arranged in groups on a trailing peduncle up to 1 m (3 ft 3 in) long, the rachis 30–100 mm (1.2–3.9 in) long and are red to pinkish red, the pistil 17–23 mm (0.67–0.91 in) long. The style has shaggy hairs near its base. The fruit is a follicle 14–16.5 mm (0.55–0.65 in) long.

== Taxonomy ==
Grevillea dryandroides was first formally described in 1933 by Charles Gardner in the Journal of the Royal Society of Western Australia from material he collected near Ballidu in 1931. The specific epithet (dryandroides) means "Dryandra-like".

In 1993, Peter M. Olde and Neil R. Marriott described two subspecies of G. dryandroides in the journal Nuytsia and the names are accepted by the Australian Plant Census:

- Grevillea dryandroides C.A.Gardner subsp. dryandroides has leaf lobes less than 10 mm (0.39 in) long, the pistil about 17 mm (0.67 in) long, and mainly flowers from August to December;
- Grevillea dryandroides subsp. hirsuta Olde & Marriott has leaf lobes more than 12 mm (0.47 in) long, the pistil 19–23 mm (0.75–0.91 in) long, and mainly flowers from September to December.

== Distribution and habitat ==
Phalanyx grevillea grows in open heath and woodland and is restricted to the Avon Wheatbelt biogeographic region of south-western Western Australia. Subspecies dryandroides grows near Ballidu and subsp. hirsuta between Cadoux and Corrigin.

== Conservation status ==
Grevillea dryandroides is listed as endangered on the IUCN Red List of Threatened Species. It has a small and severely fragmented distribution, with an estimated area of occupancy of approximately 100 km^{2} (39 sq mi) and is mainly restricted to roadside verges. The population is in decline and is threatened by accidental destruction during road clearing and competition with invasive weeds. It is not known to occur within any protected areas.

Subspecies dryandroides is listed as endangered on the EPBC Act List of Threatened Flora and as critically endangered on the List of Threatened and Priority Flora under the Biodiversity Conservation Act (2016) in Western Australia. Subspecies hirsuta is also listed as Endangered on the EPBC Act List of Threatened Flora and is listed as vulnerable on the List of Threatened and Priority Flora.

It is also listed as not threatened by the Western Australian Government Department of Biodiversity, Conservation and Attractions, but both subspecies are listed as "threatened" meaning that they are in danger of extinction.
