= Daviesia smithiorum =

Conservation status
- Priority Two — Poorly Known Taxa (DEC)

Scientific classification
- Kingdom: Plantae
- Clade: Tracheophytes
- Clade: Angiosperms
- Clade: Eudicots
- Clade: Rosids
- Order: Fabales
- Family: Fabaceae
- Subfamily: Faboideae
- Genus: Daviesia
- Species: D. smithiorum

Binomial name
- Daviesia smithiorum Crisp

Species of legume

Daviesia smithiorum is a species of flowering plant in the family Fabaceae and is endemic to the south-west of Western Australia. It is an erect, glabrous, spindly shrub with scattered tapering, needle-shaped phyllodes and yellow-orange and red flowers.

== Description ==
Daviesia smithiorum is an erect, spindly, glabrous and glaucous shrub that typically grows to a height of up to 50 cm (20 in). Its phyllodes are scattered, tapering needle-shaped and sharply pointed with a hooked tip, 10–50 mm (0.39–1.97 in) long and 0.5–1 mm (0.020–0.039 in) wide at the base. The flowers are arranged in a group of two to four in leaf axils on a peduncle about 1 mm (0.039 in) long, the rachis less than 2 mm (0.079 in) long, each flower on a pedicel 2.5–5 mm (0.098–0.197 in) long. The sepals are about 2.5 mm (0.098 in) long and joined at the base, the lobes triangular and about 0.5 mm (0.020 in) long. The standard petal is broadly elliptic with a notched centre, about 6.5 mm (0.26 in) long, 6–7 mm (0.24–0.28 in) wide, and yellow-orange with red markings. The wings and keel are about 5.5 mm (0.22 in) long. Flowering occurs in June and the fruit is a flattened, triangular pod 15–17 mm (0.59–0.67 in) long.

== Taxonomy ==
Daviesia smithiorum was first formally described in 1995 by Michael Crisp in Australian Systematic Botany from specimens collected in 1987 by Basil Smith of Manmanning in the Dowerin-Wyalkatchem area. The specific epithet (smithiorum) honours Basil and Mary Smith of Manmanning.

== Distribution and habitat ==
This daviesia grows in heath in the Dowerin-Wyalkatchem in the Avon Wheatbelt biogeographic region of south-western Western Australia.

== Conservation status ==
Daviesia smithiorum is listed as "not threatened" by the Government of Western Australia Department of Biodiversity, Conservation and Attractions.
