= Kondut, Western Australia =

Kondut
- Town
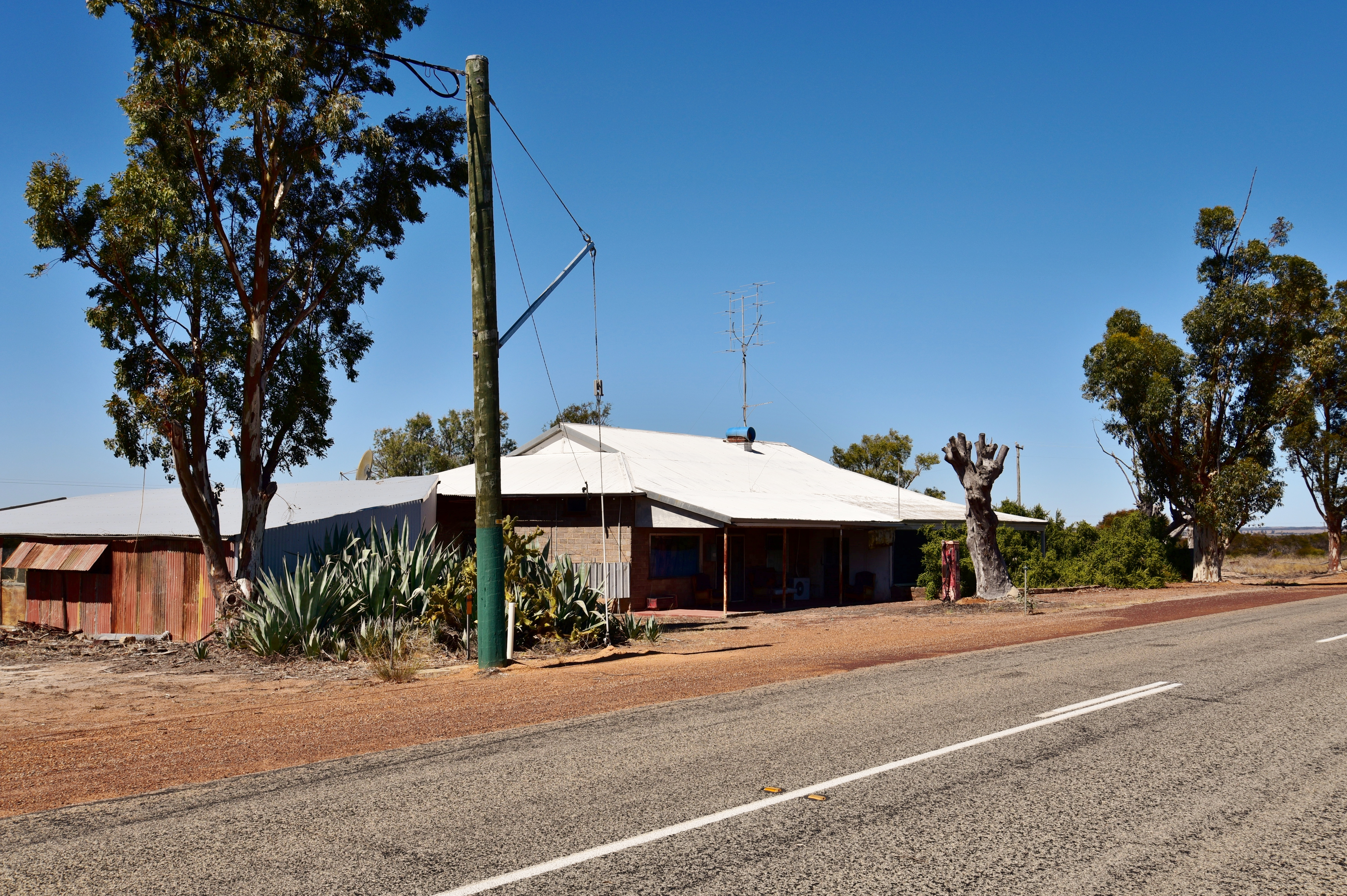
- The former Kondut Post Office and Quarters, 2018

- Coordinates: 30.717°S 116.787°E
- Country: Australia
- State: Western Australia
- LGA(s): Shire of Wongan-Ballidu
- Location: 205 km (127 mi) north north east of Perth; 21 km (13 mi) north of Wongan Hills; 75 km (47 mi) south east of Moora
- Established: 1917

Government
  - State electorate(s): Moore
  - Federal division(s): Durack

Area
  - Total: 510.2 km^{2} (197.0 sq mi)
- Elevation: 296 m (971 ft)

Population
  - Total(s): 41 (SAL 2021)
- Postcode: 6605

Kondut is a small town in Wheatbelt region of Western Australia.

The first European to visit and chart the area was the surveyor C Crossland in 1884. He named a nearby well Conduit Well. The town was originally a railway siding that was constructed in 1913 as part of the Dowerin to Mullewa railway line. The townsite was later gazetted in 1917.

The surrounding areas produce wheat and other cereal crops. The town is a receival site for Cooperative Bulk Handling.
