= List of State Register of Heritage Places in the Shire of Wongan-Ballidu =

List of heritage sites in Western Australia

The State Register of Heritage Places is maintained by the Heritage Council of Western Australia. As of 2026, 184 places are heritage-listed in the Shire of Wongan–Ballidu, of which five are on the State Register of Heritage Places.

== List ==
The Western Australian State Register of Heritage Places, as of 2026, lists the following five state registered places within the Shire of Wongan–Ballidu:

Place name	Place #	Street number	Street name	Suburb or town	Co-ordinates	Notes & former names	Photo
Wongan Hills Hospital (former)	2749	82	Mitchell Street	Wongan Hills	30.894677°S 116.721993°E	Wongan-Ballidu Museum	
Railway Barracks, Wongan Hills	12414		Fenton Street	Wongan Hills	30.891972°S 116.715821°E	Enginemen's Barracks, Trainmen's Barracks	
Railway Houses, Ganzer Street	12462	7 & 11	Ganzer Street	Wongan Hills	30.890455°S 116.716729°E		
Station Master's House, Wongan Hills	16644	33	Fenton Street	Wongan Hills	30.890920°S 116.715113°E		
Railway house	25285	7	Ganzer Street	Wongan Hills	30.890455°S 116.716729°E	Part of the Railway Houses, Ganzer Street Precicnt (12462)	
