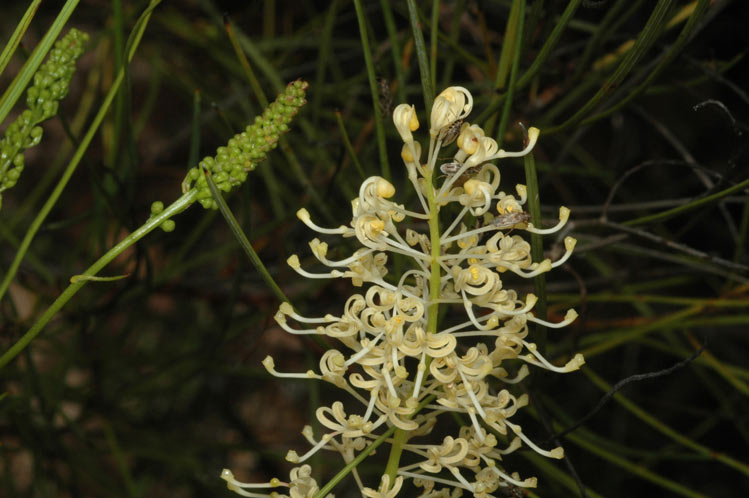
- In the Australian National Botanic Gardens

Scientific classification
- Kingdom: Plantae
- Clade: Tracheophytes
- Clade: Angiosperms
- Clade: Eudicots
- Order: Proteales
- Family: Proteaceae
- Genus: Grevillea
- Species: G. obliquistigma

Binomial name
- Grevillea obliquistigma C.A.Gardner

= Grevillea obliquistigma =

Species of shrub endemic to Western Australia

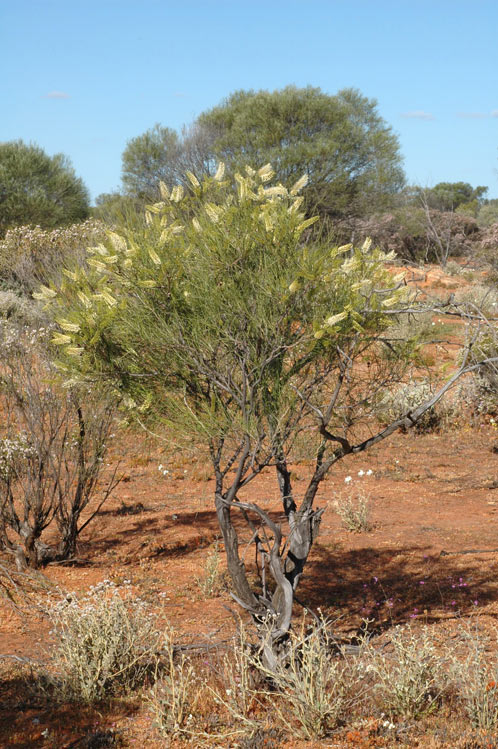
Habit of subsp. obliquistigma near Paynes Find

Grevillea obliquistigma is a species of flowering plant in the family Proteaceae and is endemic to the south-west of Western Australia. It is a spreading shrub with linear leaves, and conical to cylindrical clusters of creamy-white to yellowish cream-coloured flowers, sometimes tinged with pink.

== Description ==
Grevillea obliquistigma is a shrub or small tree that typically grows to a height of 0.3–6 m (1 ft 0 in – 19 ft 8 in). Its leaves are usually linear, 40–220 mm (1.6–8.7 in) long and 0.8–2.0 mm (0.031–0.079 in) wide, sometimes divided with two or three linear lobes 0.7–1.2 mm (0.028–0.047 in) wide. The edges of the leaves or lobes are rolled under, enclosing most of the lower surface. The flowers are arranged in leaf axils and on the ends of branches, in simple or branched clusters, each branch conical or cylindrical and 50–100 mm (2.0–3.9 in) long. The flowers are creamy-white to yellowish cream-coloured, sometimes tinged with pink, the pistil 5–8 mm (0.20–0.31 in) long. Flowering time varies with subspecies, and the fruit is an oblong to oval follicle 7–15 mm (0.28–0.59 in) long.

== Taxonomy ==
Grevillea obliquistigma was first formally described in 1943 by Charles Gardner in the Journal of the Royal Society of Western Australia from specimens he collected near Pindar. The specific epithet (obliquistigma) means "slanting stigma".

In 1994, Peter Olde and Neil Marriott described three subspecies of G. obliquistigma in The Grevillea Book, and the names are accepted by the Australian Plant Census:

- Grevillea obliquistigma subsp. cullenii Olde & Marriott is a shrub about 50 cm (20 in) high with silky-hairy branchlets, leaves about 0.8 mm (0.031 in) wide, flower clusters about 5–6 cm (2.0–2.4 in) long in September and October, with floral bracts about 1.5 mm (0.059 in) long and 0.8 mm (0.031 in) wide.
- Grevillea obliquistigma subsp. funicularis Olde & Marriott is a dense, spreading shrub about 0.5–2 cm (0.20–0.79 in) high with glabrous or silky-hairy branchlets, leaves and lobes 1–2 mm (0.039–0.079 in) wide, flower clusters 4.5–10 cm (1.8–3.9 in) long from September to December, with floral bracts 5.0–6.5 mm (0.20–0.26 in) long and 1.8–2.4 mm (0.071–0.094 in) wide.
- Grevillea obliquistigma C.A.Gardner subsp. obliquistigma is a dense, spreading shrub or spindly tree 2–6 m (6 ft 7 in – 19 ft 8 in) high with glabrous or silky-hairy branchlets, leaves and lobes 0.7–1 mm (0.028–0.039 in) wide, flower clusters 5–10 cm (2.0–3.9 in) long from July to December, with floral bracts 2.0–3.5 mm (0.079–0.138 in) long and 0.6–1.2 mm (0.024–0.047 in) wide.

== Distribution and habitat ==
Subspecies cullenii grows in mallee near Laverton and Cosmo Newberry in the Avon Wheatbelt and Great Victoria Desert bioregions, subspecies funicularis in open shrubland between Morawa, Mingenew and Ballidu in the Avon Wheatbelt, Geraldton Sandplains and Yalgoo bioregions, and subsp. obliquistigma is widespread from the lower Murchison River to Mount Magnet and Bullfinch in the Avon Wheatbelt, Coolgardie, Geraldton Sandplains, Murchison and Yalgoo bioregions where it is found in open shrubland.

== Conservation status ==
Subspecies funicularis and obliquistigma of G. obliquistigma are listed as "not threatened" but subsp. cullenii is listed as "Priority Three" by the Government of Western Australia Department of Biodiversity, Conservation and Attractions, meaning that it is poorly known and known from only a few locations but is not under imminent threat.

== See also ==
- List of Grevillea species
