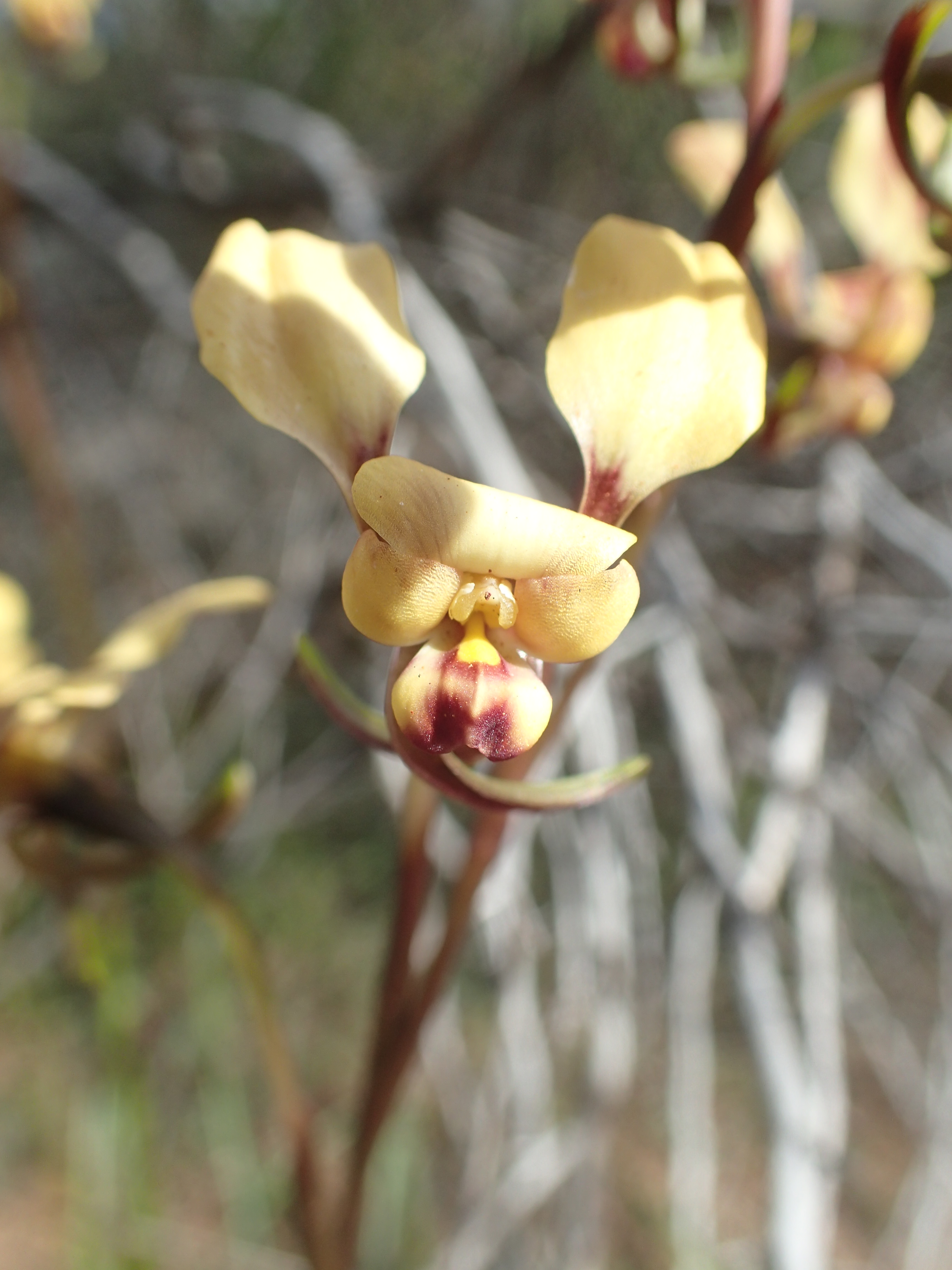
- In Wongan Hills

Scientific classification
- Kingdom: Plantae
- Clade: Tracheophytes
- Clade: Angiosperms
- Clade: Monocots
- Order: Asparagales
- Family: Orchidaceae
- Subfamily: Orchidoideae
- Tribe: Diurideae
- Genus: Diuris
- Species: D. refracta

Binomial name
- Diuris refracta D.L.Jones & C.J.French

= Diuris refracta =

Species of orchid

Diuris refracta, commonly known as dainty donkey orchid, is a species of orchid that is endemic to the south-west of Western Australia. It has two or three linear to lance-shaped leaves and up to six yellow flowers with reddish markings.

== Description ==
Diuris refracta is a tuberous, perennial herb with two or three linear to lance-shaped, bright green leaves 50–200 mm (2.0–7.9 in) long and 3–7 mm (0.12–0.28 in) wide. Up to six yellow flowers with reddish markings, 25–40 mm (0.98–1.57 in) long and 20–30 mm (0.79–1.18 in) wide are borne on a flowering stem 150–350 mm (5.9–13.8 in) tall. The dorsal sepal is egg-shaped, sharply turned back, 8–10 mm (0.31–0.39 in) long and 9–12 mm (0.35–0.47 in) wide, the lateral sepals narrowly oblong, down-turned and crossed with curved tips, 13–20 mm (0.51–0.79 in) long and 3.0–3.5 mm (0.12–0.14 in) wide. The petals are elliptic, 12–14 mm (0.47–0.55 in) long and 8–10 mm (0.31–0.39 in) wide on a stalk 3–6 mm (0.12–0.24 in) long. The labellum is 6–9 mm (0.24–0.35 in) long with three lobes - the centre lobe broadly wedge-shaped, 6–8 mm (0.24–0.31 in) long and 8–9 mm (0.31–0.35 in) wide, the side lobes spread widely apart and oblong to egg-shaped, 8–10 mm (0.31–0.39 in) long and 4–6 mm (0.16–0.24 in) wide. There is a single smooth, yellow callus ridge 4–5 mm (0.16–0.20 in) long, along the mid-line of the labellum. Flowering occurs from mid July to September.

== Taxonomy and naming ==
Diuris recurva was first formally described in 2013 by David Jones and Christopher J. French in Australian Orchid Review, from a specimen collected near Wongan Hills in 1997. The specific epithet (refracta) means "sharply turned back", referring to the labellum.

== Distribution and habitat ==
Dainty donkey orchid grows in moist open forest, shrubland and heathland on slopes, in the area between Northampton, Bindoon, Perenjori and Goomalling in the Avon Wheatbelt, Geraldton Sandplains, Jarrah Forest and Swan Coastal Plain bioregions of south-western Western Australia.

== Conservation ==
Diuris refracta is listed as "not threatened" by the Western Australian Government Department of Biodiversity, Conservation and Attractions.
