= Hibbertia crassifolia =

Scientific classification
- Kingdom: Plantae
- Clade: Tracheophytes
- Clade: Angiosperms
- Clade: Eudicots
- Order: Dilleniales
- Family: Dilleniaceae
- Genus: Hibbertia
- Species: H. crassifolia

Binomial name
- Hibbertia crassifolia (Turcz.) Benth.

Species of flowering plant

Hibbertia crassifolia is a shrub in the Dilleniaceae family and is endemic to Western Australia. It is an erect shrub with multiple stems that typically grows to a height of 0.2 to 0.6 m (7.9 in to 1 ft 11.6 in) but can reach 0.9 m (2 ft 11 in). It blooms between April and September and produces yellow flowers. The species has a scattered distribution through the western Wheatbelt region of Western Australia between Three Springs in the north, Ballidu in the east and Wandering in the south where it is found on sandplains and breakaways growing in sandy lateritic soils.

This species was first formally described in 1849 by Nikolai Turczaninow in the Bulletin de la Société Impériale des Naturalistes de Moscou and given the name Pleurandra crassifolia. In 1863, George Bentham changed the name to Hibbertia crassifolia in Flora Australiensis. The specific epithet (crassifolia) means "thick-leaved".

== See also ==
- List of Hibbertia species
