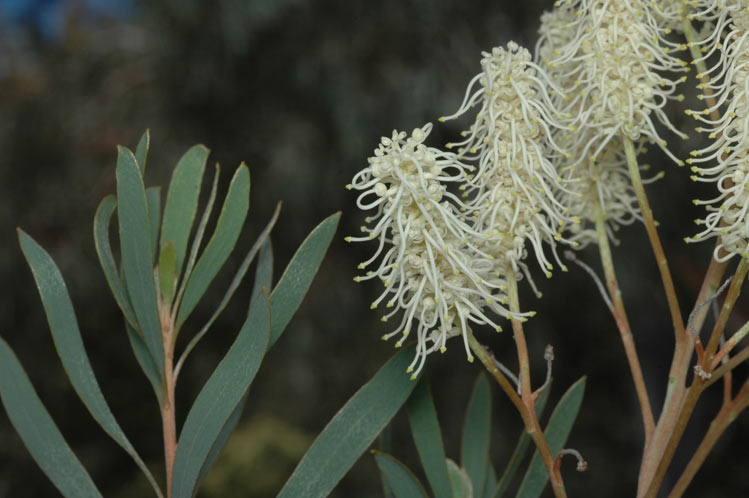
- In the Australian National Botanic Gardens

Scientific classification
- Kingdom: Plantae
- Clade: Tracheophytes
- Clade: Angiosperms
- Clade: Eudicots
- Order: Proteales
- Family: Proteaceae
- Genus: Grevillea
- Species: G. polybotrya

Binomial name
- Grevillea polybotrya Meisn.

Synonyms
- Grevillea poylbotrya Meisn. nom. inval., nom. nud.; Grevillea martinii F.Muell.

= Grevillea polybotrya =

Species of shrub endemic to Western Australia

Grevillea polybotrya is a species of flowering plant in the family Proteaceae and is endemic to the south-west of Western Australia. It is an erect, bushy shrub with egg-shaped to lance-shaped leaves with the narrower end towards the base, and usually white to cream-coloured flowers.

== Description ==
Greville polybotrya is an erect, bushy shrub that typically grows to a height of 1–4 m (3 ft 3 in – 13 ft 1 in). Its leaves are egg-shaped to lance-shaped with the narrower end towards the base, or oblong, 12–50 mm (0.47–1.97 in) long and 4–9 mm (0.16–0.35 in) wide. The edges of the leaves are thickened, both surfaces similar and more or less glabrous. The flowers are borne on panicles held above the rest of the foliage, the panicles with 10 to 20 cylindrical branches 60–80 mm (2.4–3.1 in) long. The flowers are pinkish-cream in the bud stage, later white to cream-coloured and have a caramel-like scent, the pistil 7.5–10 mm (0.30–0.39 in) long. Flowering mainly occurs from September to December and the fruit is an oval follicle 11–15 mm (0.43–0.59 in) long.

== Taxonomy ==
Grevillea polybotrya was first formally described in 1856 by Carl Meissner in de Candolle's Prodromus Systematis Naturalis Regni Vegetabilis from specimens collected in the Swan River Colony by James Drummond. The specific epithet (polybotrya) means "many bunches of grapes", referring to the inflorescences.

== Distribution and habitat ==
This grevillea grows in heath on sandy soil from Geraldton to the Moore River and inland to Manmanning and Dalwallinu in the Avon Wheatbelt, Geraldton Sandplains, Swan Coastal Plain and Yalgoo bioregions of south-western Western Australia.

== Conservation status ==
Grevillea polybractea is listed as "not threatened" by the Government of Western Australia Department of Biodiversity, Conservation and Attractions.

== See also ==
- List of Grevillea species
