= Talbot Lewis Dunn =

Australian doctor and health officer (1901–1984)

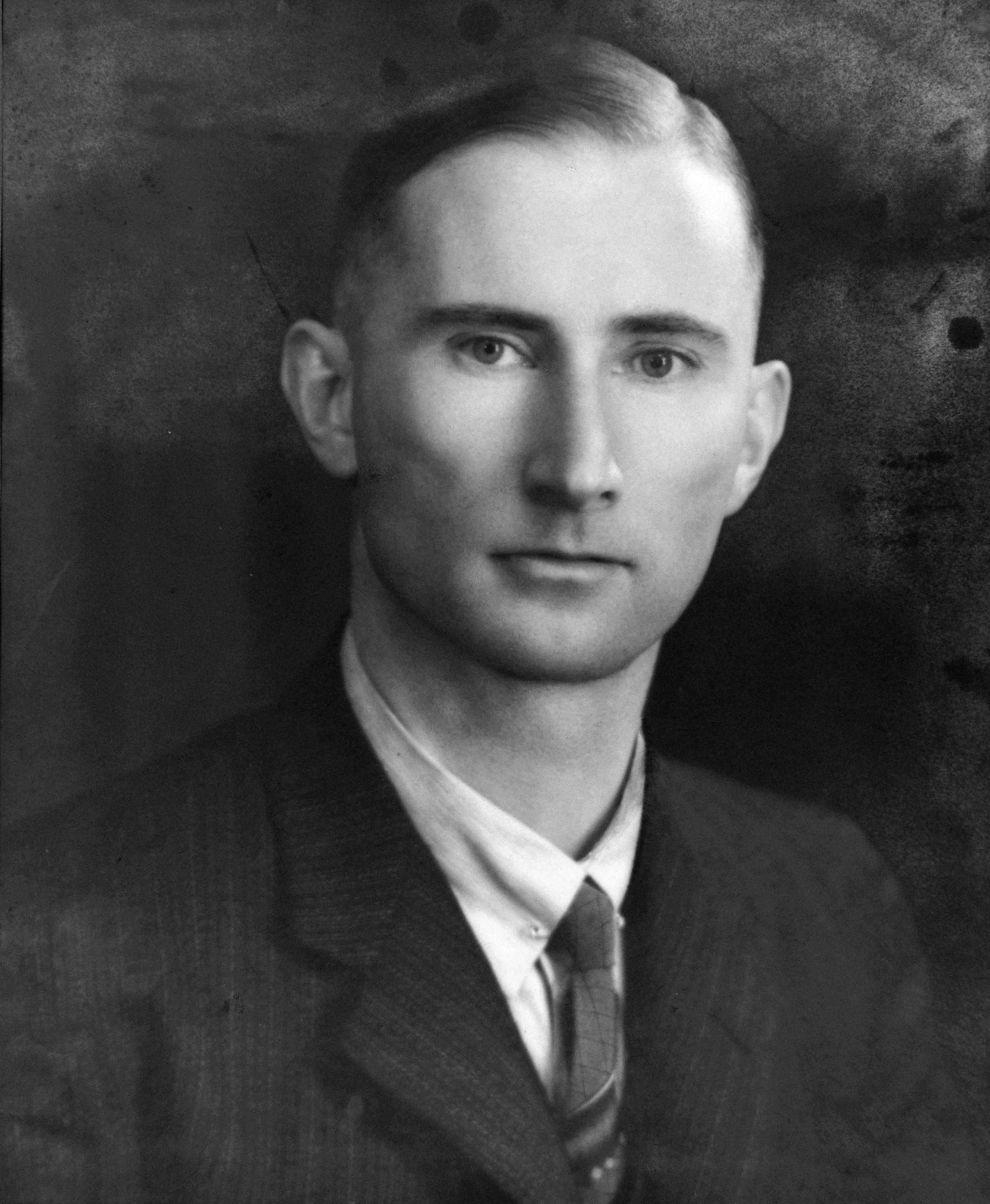
Talbot Lewis Dunn (1935), Medical Officer of Sydney, Australia

Talbot Lewis Dunn (April 12, 1901 – November 1, 1984) was a medical doctor and health officer for the cities of Newcastle and Sydney, Australia. He was an advocate for complete revision of public health laws in Australia. He held the first full-time position of city health officer for the city of Sydney, Australia.

== Earl life ==
Talbot Lewis Dunn was born in Prospect, South Australia, Australia, the only child of Berkley William Rowe Dunn and Mary Elizabeth Lewis.

== Education ==
Dunn completed his Bachelor of Medicine at the University of Adelaide in 1927, and completed graduate studies at the University of Sydney, graduating with a Graduate Diploma in Tropical Hygiene (1932), Graduate Diploma in Tropical Medicine (1932), and a Graduate Diploma in Public Health (1933).

== Medical practice ==
Dunn's early medicine practice included work in Pingelly, Western Australia, in 1927, moving his practice to Dowerin, Western Australia in 1929. In 1932, Dunn leased his practice to attend post-graduate work.

== Health officer ==
In 1933, Dunn was appointment as medical officer in charge of the health department of the town of Newcastle, New South Wales. Here, it was noted that "he earned for himself a reputation as a highly efficient and painstaking administrator".

On November 2, 1936, Dunn was appointed by the Sydney City Council "city health officer," which, during his tenure, became a full time position. In 1939, Dunn reported that Australians spent £11,000,000 on patent medicines, writing: "It is extraordinary how gullible the public is when it comes to the magic claims made for patent medicine. [...] Perhaps it is a remnant of witchcraft." Dunn also attacked "adulterated" foods and "deplored the inadequacies of the penalties" for offenders.

Dunn argued that poverty and sickness yielded a vicious cycle: "Poverty and sickness go hand in hand, sickness increased as income decreased, and as illness leads to further disease in income a vicious circle is set up." Dunn was concerned by slums and public school overcrowding, arguing that town planning should separate "industrial and residential areas" and provide "playing fields and parks". Dunn argued in favor of compulsory vaccination in 1939.

While many of these views are common place, in the 1930s, such practises were novel.

== Family ==
Talbot Lewis Dunn and Leonore Aroha Meyer married in 1926. They had three children, Col. Dr. John Talbot Dunn, MBE, Michael Ashley Lewis Dunn, and Myles Dunn.

== Death ==
Dunn died on November 1, 1984 aged 83.
