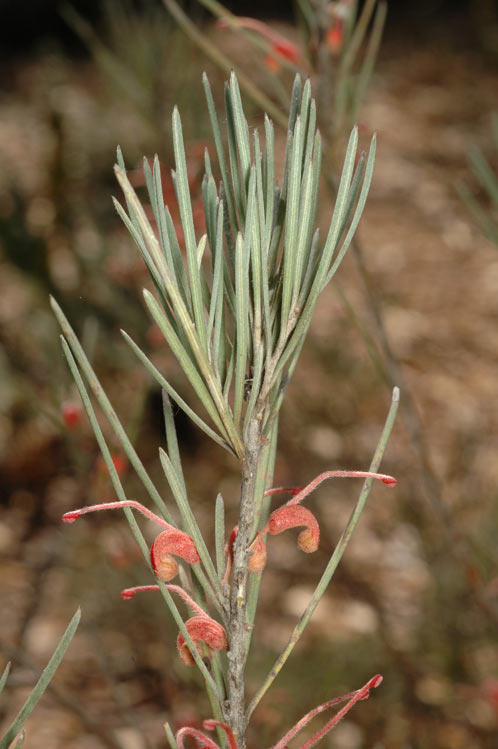
- Subspecies haplantha in the ANBG

Conservation status
- Least Concern (IUCN 3.1)

Scientific classification
- Kingdom: Plantae
- Clade: Embryophytes
- Clade: Tracheophytes
- Clade: Angiosperms
- Clade: Eudicots
- Order: Proteales
- Family: Proteaceae
- Genus: Grevillea
- Species: G. haplantha

Binomial name
- Grevillea haplantha Benth.

Subspecies
- Grevillea haplantha F.Muell. ex Benth. subsp. haplantha; Grevillea haplantha subsp. recedens Olde & Marriott

= Grevillea haplantha =

Species of shrub endemic to Western Australia

Grevillea haplantha is a species of flowering plant in the family Proteaceae and is endemic to the south-west of Western Australia. It is a dense, rounded shrub with linear leaves and clusters of pink to red flowers with white or brown hairs, depending on subspecies.

== Description ==
Grevillea haplantha is a shrub that typically grows to a height of 0.6–2.2 m (2 ft 0 in – 7 ft 3 in). Its leaves are linear, 15–80 mm (0.59–3.15 in) long and 1.0–1.7 mm (0.039–0.067 in) wide with the edges rolled under, obscuring most of the lower surface. The flowers are arranged in loose clusters of up to six in leaf axils or the sides of branches on a rachis 0.7–1.5 mm (0.028–0.059 in) long, the pistil 18–25 mm (0.71–0.98 in) long. Flowering time and colour vary with subspecies. The fruit is an oval to elliptic follicle 10–13 mm (0.39–0.51 in) long.

== Taxonomy ==
Grevillea haplantha was first formally described in 1870 by George Bentham in Flora Australiensis from specimens collected by George Maxwell on East Mount Barren. The specific epithet (haplantha) means "single-flowered".

In 1993 Peter M. Olde and Neil R. Marriott described two subspecies in the journal Nuytsia, and the names are accepted by the Australian Plant Census:

- Grevillea haplantha F.Muell. ex Benth. subsp. haplantha is a dense shrub 1–2.2 m (3 ft 3 in – 7 ft 3 in) high with dull, deep pink to red flowers with whitish hairs, the pistil mostly 24–25 mm (0.94–0.98 in) long, from May to December;
- Grevillea haplantha subsp. recedens Olde & Marriott is a shrub 0.6–1.0 m (2 ft 0 in – 3 ft 3 in) high with dull, pink to red flowers with fawn or rust-coloured hairs, the pistil mostly 18–20 mm (0.71–0.79 in) long, from June to September.

== Distribution and habitat ==
Subspecies haplantha grows in mallee heath or shrubland mainly in the Coolgardie area, and subsp. recedens grows in open shrubland or woodland between Mollerin, Ballidu, Cunderdin and Merredin.

== Conservation status ==
This species has been listed as least concern on the IUCN Red List of Threatened Species, as it is currently widespread and with a stable overall population. Historical land clearing for agriculture has reduced the species' habitat and range, though this no longer occurs. In some parts of its distribution, it is restricted to road verges and may be impacted from mining.

Subspecies haplantha is listed as not threatened by the Government of Western Australia Department of Biodiversity, Conservation and Attractions but subsp. recedens is listed as priority three, meaning that it is poorly known and known from only a few locations but is not under imminent threat.

== See also ==
- List of Grevillea species
