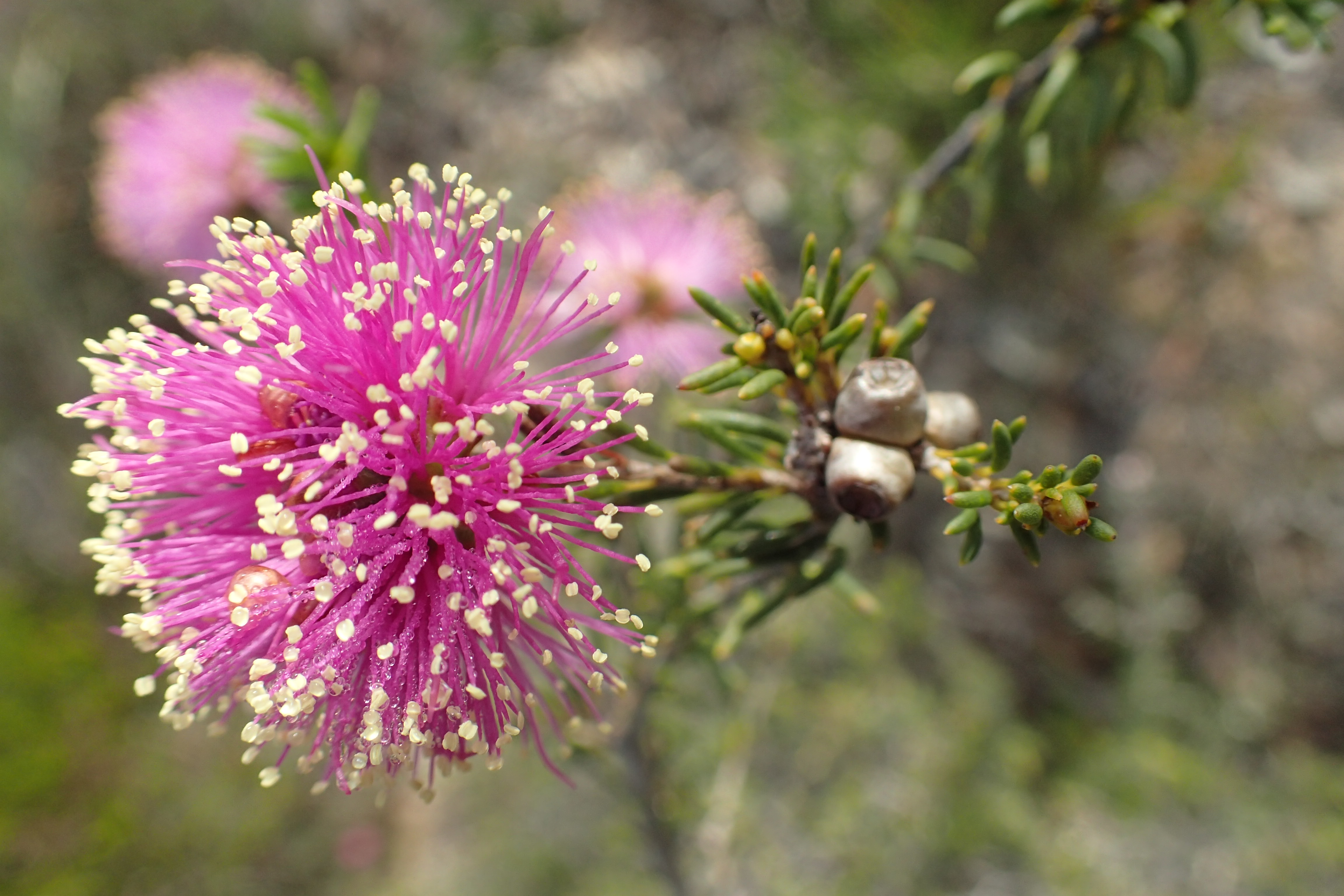

Scientific classification
- Kingdom: Plantae
- Clade: Embryophytes
- Clade: Tracheophytes
- Clade: Spermatophytes
- Clade: Angiosperms
- Clade: Eudicots
- Clade: Rosids
- Order: Myrtales
- Family: Myrtaceae
- Genus: Melaleuca
- Species: M. villosisepala

Binomial name
- Melaleuca villosisepala Craven

= Melaleuca villosisepala =

Species of shrub

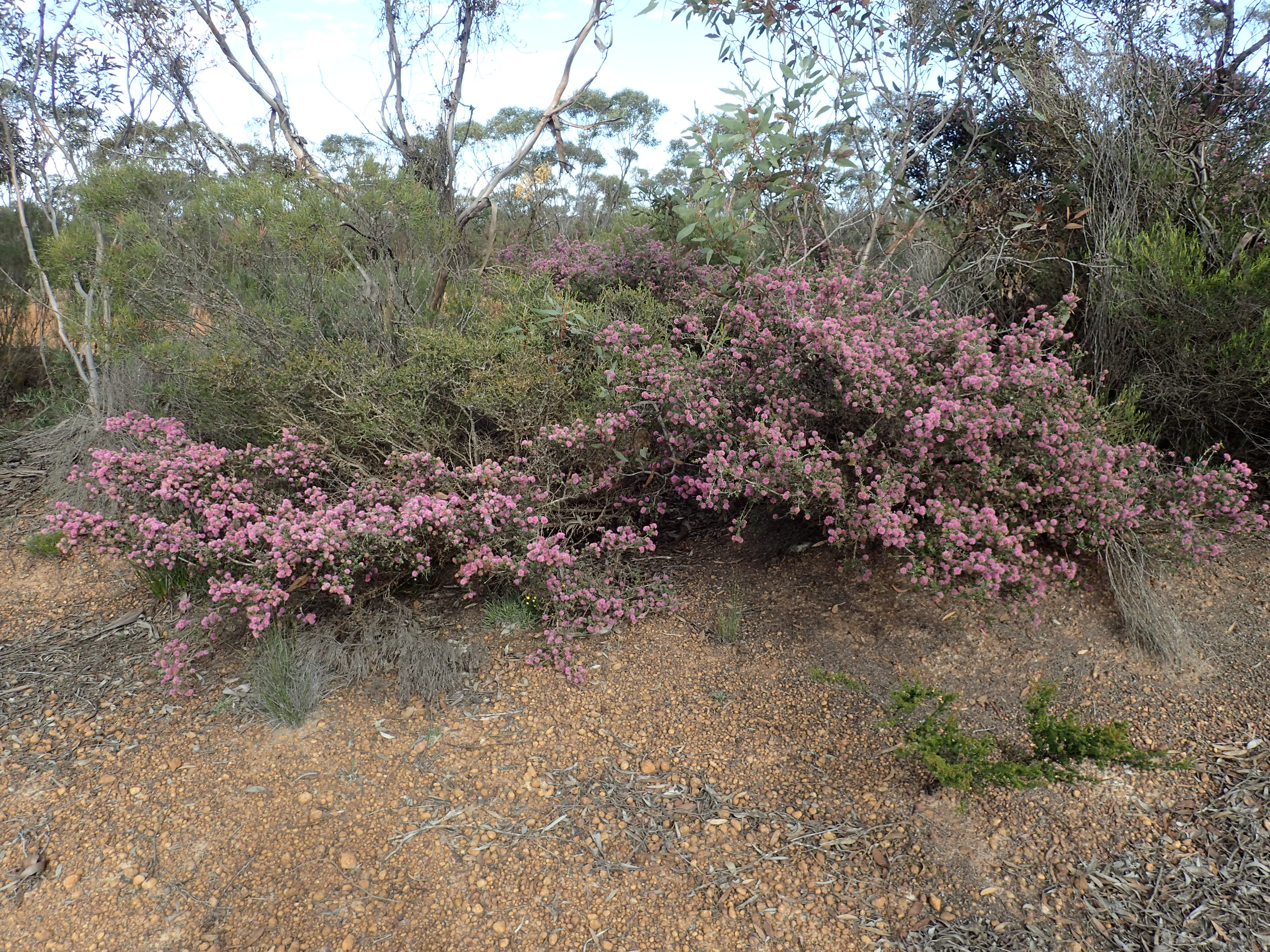
Habit about 40km east of Ravensthorpe

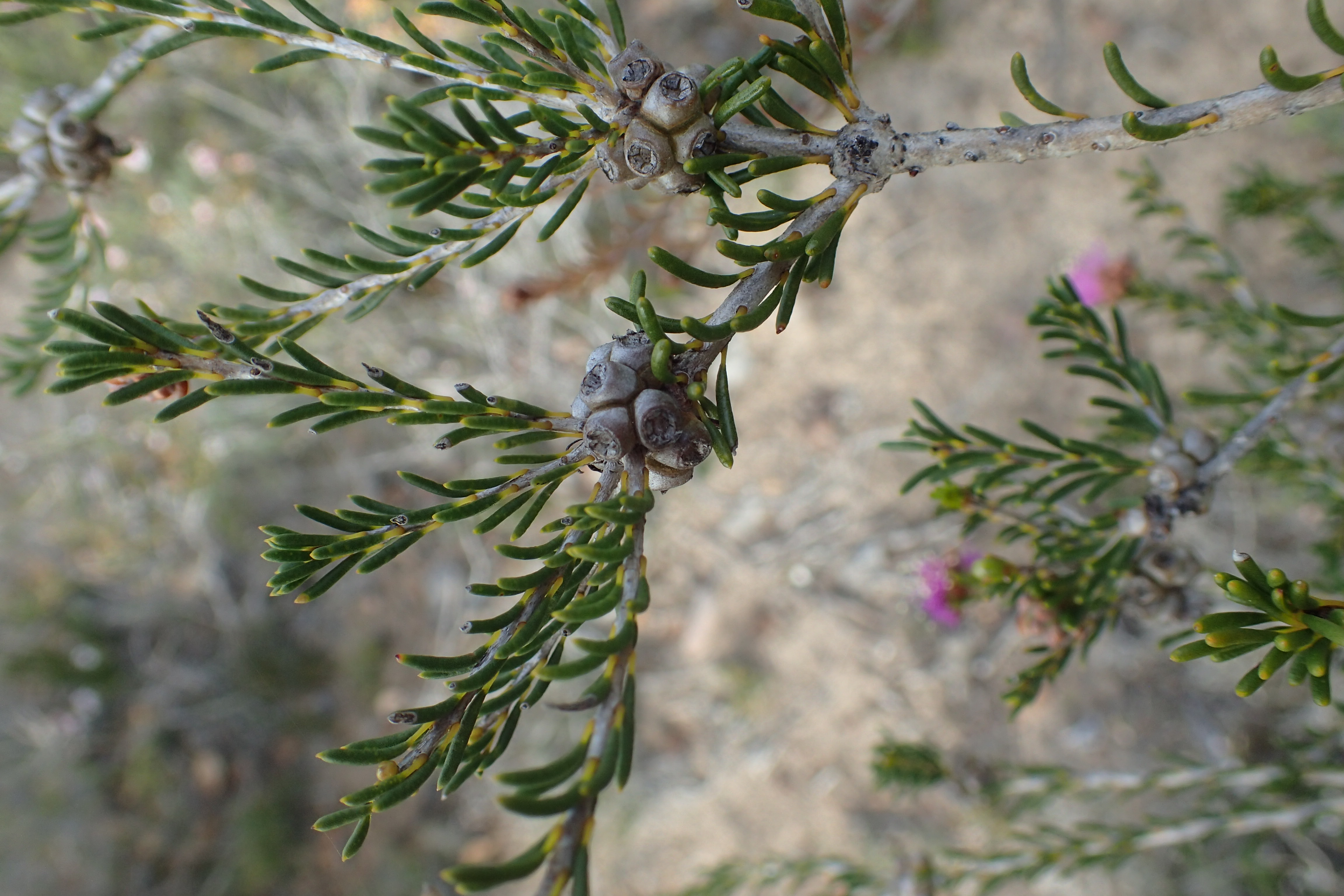
Foliage and fruit

Melaleuca villosisepala is a shrub in the myrtle family Myrtaceae and is endemic to the south-west of Western Australia. It is a shrub with narrow leaves, heads of pink to mauve flowers that fade to white and is similar to Melaleuca wonganensis except that its heads of flowers are smaller and pinkish rather than deep purple.

== Description ==
Melaleuca villosisepala grows to a height of 0.2–1.3 m (0.7–4 ft). Its leaves are arranged alternately and are 3–15 mm (0.1–0.6 in) long, 0.5–1.5 mm (0.02–0.06 in) wide, linear to oblong, silky-hairy at first but becoming glabrous as they age.

The flowers are arranged in heads about 20 mm (0.8 in) in diameter, near the ends of the branches, with one to six groups of flowers, each with three individual flowers. The base of the flowers is hairy, 1.5–3 mm (0.06–0.1 in) long and the stamens are arranged around each flower in five bundles, each containing 5 to 9 stamens. The flowers are pink or mauve and fade to white and from September to February. The fruit are 2.5–4.5 mm (0.1–0.2 in) long.

== Taxonomy and naming ==
Melaleuca villosisepala was first formally described in 1999 by Lyndley Craven in Australian Systematic Botany. The specific epithet (villosisepala) is derived from the Latin word villosus meaning "hairy" and the Neo-Latin word sepalum meaning "sepal", referring to the hairy lobes of the calyx.

== Distribution and habitat ==
This melaleuca occurs from the Southern Cross-Coolgardie districts, south to the Stirling Range-Ravensthorpe districts in the Esperance Plains biogeographical zone. It grows in red-brown clay-loam, often in roadside remnant vegetation.

== Conservation ==
Melaleuca villosisepala is classified as not threatened by the Government of Western Australia Department of Parks and Wildlife.
