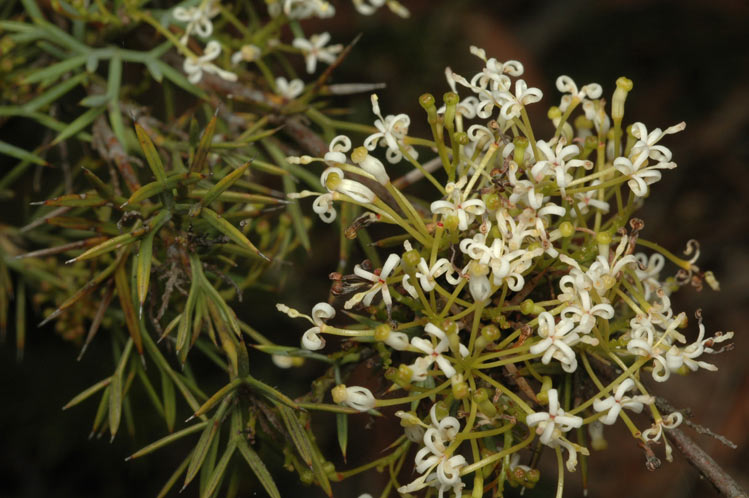
- In the Australian National Botanic Gardens

Scientific classification
- Kingdom: Plantae
- Clade: Tracheophytes
- Clade: Angiosperms
- Clade: Eudicots
- Order: Proteales
- Family: Proteaceae
- Genus: Grevillea
- Species: G. spinosissima

Binomial name
- Grevillea spinosissima McGill.

= Grevillea spinosissima =

Species of shrub endemic to Western Australia

Grevillea spinosissima is species of flowering plant in the family Proteaceae and is endemic to the southwest of Western Australia. It is a spiny shrub with three-part leaves with sharply-pointed, linear lobes, and clusters of creamy-white and green to mauve flowers with a white style.

== Description ==
Grevillea spinosissima is a spiny shrub that typically grows to a height of 0.5–1.6 m (1 ft 8 in – 5 ft 3 in) and has irregular, often arching branches. Its leaves are 7–20 mm (0.28–0.79 in) long and simple or divided with three sharply-pointed, tapering to more or less linear lobes 4–15 mm (0.16–0.59 in) long and 0.7–1.4 mm (0.028–0.055 in) wide. The edges of the leaves are rolled under, enclosing the lower surface apart from the midvein. The flowers are mostly borne in leaf axils in a more or less spherical raceme up to 15 mm (0.59 in) long, the flowers at the base of the clusters flowering first. The flowers are creamy-white and green to mauve with a tapering white style, the pistil 3.4–4.1 mm (0.13–0.16 in) long. Flowering mainly occurs from June to September and the fruit is a wrinkled, oval or oblong follicle 7–8 mm (0.28–0.31 in) long.

== Taxonomy ==
Grevillea spinosissima was first formally described in 1986 by the botanist Donald McGillivray in his book New Names in Grevillea (Proteaceae) from specimens he collected with Alex George near Manmanning in 1976. The specific epithet (spinosissima) is means "very spiny", referring to the leaves.

== Distribution and habitat ==
This grevillea grows in heath, shrubland, or open shrubby woodland, sometimes in disturbed areas and is found from Wongan Hills to near Quairading and York in the Avon Wheatbelt, Geraldton Sandplains and Jarrah Forest bioregions of south-western Western Australia.

== Conservation status ==
This grevillea is listed as "not threatened" by the Government of Western Australia Department of Biodiversity, Conservation and Attractions.

== See also ==
- List of Grevillea species
