= Grevillea roycei =

Conservation status
- Priority Three — Poorly Known Taxa (DEC)

Scientific classification
- Kingdom: Plantae
- Clade: Tracheophytes
- Clade: Angiosperms
- Clade: Eudicots
- Order: Proteales
- Family: Proteaceae
- Genus: Grevillea
- Species: G. roycei

Binomial name
- Grevillea roycei McGill.

Species of shrub endemic to Western Australia

Grevillea roycei is a species of flowering plant in the family Proteaceae and is endemic to the south-west of Western Australia. It is an open, erect to spreading shrub with divided leaves, the lobes linear to tapering, and more or less spherical clusters of cream-coloured and yellow flowers with a white style.

== Description ==
Grevillea rosieri is an open, erect to spreading shrub that typically grows to a height of 1.2–2.1 m (3 ft 11 in – 6 ft 11 in). Its leaves are 7–30 mm (0.28–1.18 in) long and divided with 3 or more linear to tapering lobes 5–20 mm (0.20–0.79 in) long and 0.7–1.8 mm (0.028–0.071 in) wide. The edges of the leaflets are rolled under concealing the lower surface except the midvein, and the tip is sharply pointed. The flowers are arranged on arching flowering branches in more or less spherical clusters. The flowers are cream-coloured and green to yellow, the style white, and the pistil 3.3–4.5 mm (0.13–0.18 in) long. Flowering occurs from August to October, and the fruit is a more or less smooth, oblong follicle about 10 mm (0.39 in) long.

== Taxonomy ==
Grevillea roycei was first formally described in 1986 by Donald McGillivray in his book "New Names in Grevillea (Proteaceae)" from specimens collected by Robert Royce near Goomalling in 1962. The specific epithet (roycei) honours the collector of the type specimens.

== Distribution and habitat ==
This grevillea grows in heath, shrubland and woodland between Amery, Goomalling, Cunderdin and Brookton in the Avon Wheatbelt bioregion of south-western Western Australia.

== Conservation status ==
Grevillea rosieri is listed as "Priority Three" by the Government of Western Australia Department of Biodiversity, Conservation and Attractions, meaning that it is poorly known and known from only a few locations but is not under imminent threat.

== See also ==
- List of Grevillea species
