= Ejanding, Western Australia =

Ejanding
- Town
- Interactive map of Ejanding
- Coordinates: 31.105°S 117.11°E
- Country: Australia
- State: Western Australia
- LGA: Shire of Dowerin
- Location: 186 km (116 mi) NE of Perth; 20 km (12 mi) NNE of Dowerin
- Established: 1930

Government
  - State electorate: Moore
  - Federal division: Durack
- Elevation: 299 m (981 ft)
- Postcode: 6461

Ejanding is a townsite in the central Wheatbelt region of Western Australia. It is located about 20 kilometres (12 mi) north-northeast of Dowerin. It was originally a siding on the Kalannie railway line, a line built between the town now known as Amery and Kalannie, around 1927. Amery was originally named Ejanding in 1910, but was changed to Amery in 1928. Ejanding was gazetted as a townsite in 1930. Its name is Aboriginal in origin, derived from "Hejanding Well", a name first recorded by the surveyor/explorer Augustus Gregory in 1846. Ejanding used to have a primary school. It operated from 1926 until 2000, closing due to low numbers. Currently Ejanding has a few houses, a wheatbin and railway siding, and is the location of the Dowerin Go Kart Club.

The surrounding areas produce wheat and other cereal crops. The town is a receival site for CBH Group.
