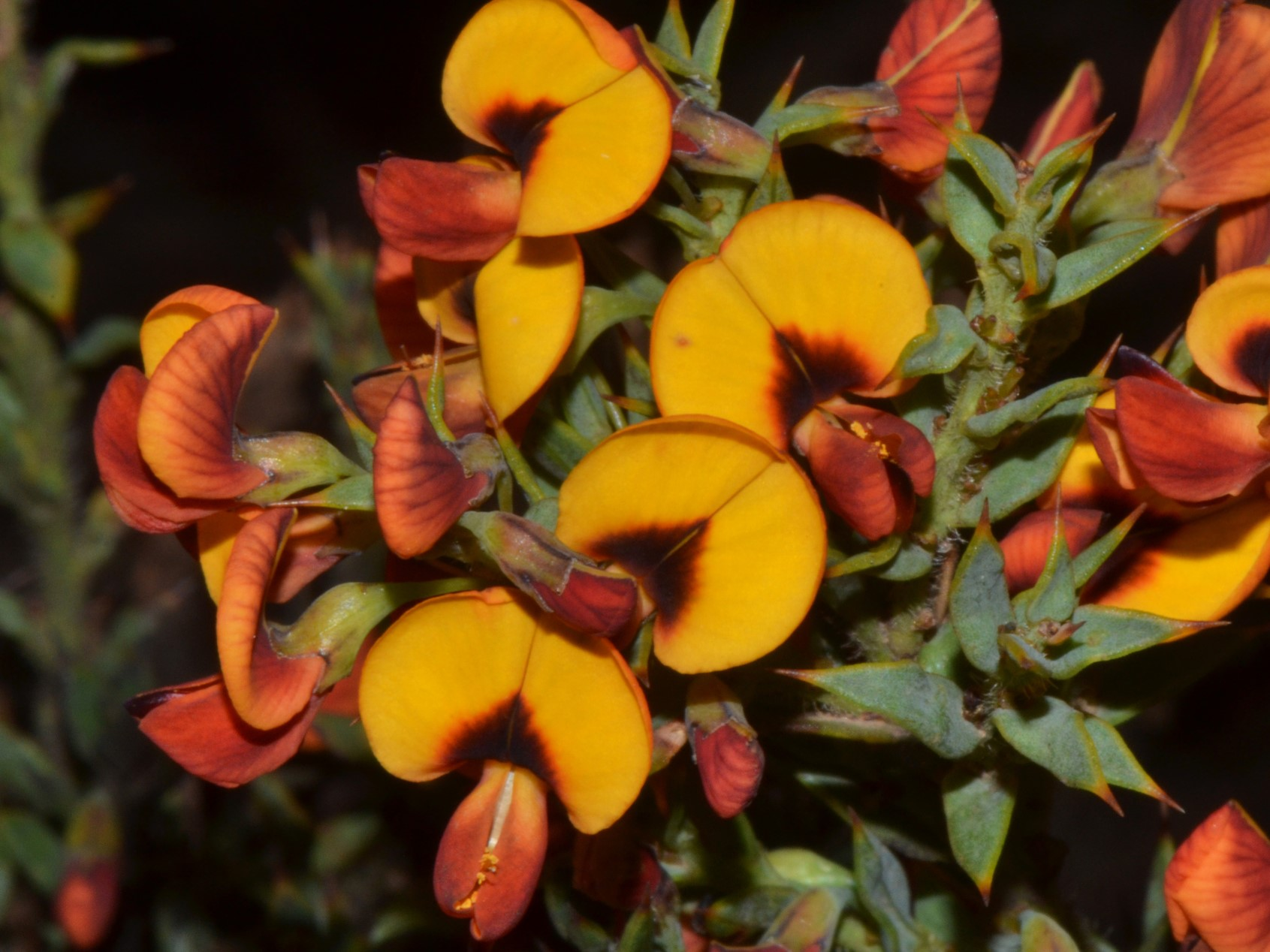

Scientific classification
- Kingdom: Plantae
- Clade: Tracheophytes
- Clade: Angiosperms
- Clade: Eudicots
- Clade: Rosids
- Order: Fabales
- Family: Fabaceae
- Subfamily: Faboideae
- Genus: Daviesia
- Species: D. umbonata

Binomial name
- Daviesia umbonata G.Chandler & Crisp

= Daviesia umbonata =

Species of legume

Daviesia umbonata is a species of flowering plant in the family Fabaceae and is endemic to the south-west of Western Australia. It is a bushy, openly-branched shrub with narrowly elliptic to narrowly egg-shaped, sharply pointed phyllodes and yellow and red flowers.

== Description ==
Daviesia umbonata is a bushy, openly-branched shrub that typically grows to a height of 0.3–1.2 m (1 ft 0 in – 3 ft 11 in). Its phyllodes are narrowly elliptic to narrowly egg-shaped, 10–20 mm (0.39–0.79 in) long, 2–5 mm (0.079–0.197 in) wide and sharply pointed. The flowers are arranged singly or in pairs in the axils on a pedicel 3–4 mm (0.12–0.16 in) long. The sepals are 4–5 mm (0.16–0.20 in) long and joined at the base, the upper two lobes joined for 1.0–1.5 mm (0.039–0.059 in) and the lower three triangular and 0.5–1 mm (0.020–0.039 in) long. The standard petal is elliptic with a notched centre, about 6–9 mm (0.24–0.35 in) long, 6–7 mm (0.24–0.28 in) wide and yellow with a dark red base. The wings are 7–8 mm (0.28–0.31 in) long and dull red, the keel 8–9 mm (0.31–0.35 in) long and dull red. Flowering occurs in June and July and the fruit is a shallowly triangular pod 12–14 mm (0.47–0.55 in) long.

== Taxonomy ==
Daviesia umbonata was first formally described in 1997 by Gregory T. Chandler and Michael Crisp in Australian Systematic Botany from specimens collected by Crisp near Moonijin in 1980. The specific epithet (umbonata) means "bossed" referring to bulges near the sepal lobes.

== Distribution and habitat ==
This daviesia grows in kwongan north from the Wongan Hills-Manmanning area in the Avon Wheatbelt, Geraldton Sandplains and Jarrah Forest bioregions of south-western Western Australia.

== Conservation status ==
Daviesia umbonata is classified as "not threatened" by the Western Australian Government Department of Biodiversity, Conservation and Attractions.
