= Acacia spinosissima =

Scientific classification
- Kingdom: Plantae
- Clade: Tracheophytes
- Clade: Angiosperms
- Clade: Eudicots
- Clade: Rosids
- Order: Fabales
- Family: Fabaceae
- Subfamily: Caesalpinioideae
- Clade: Mimosoid clade
- Genus: Acacia
- Species: A. spinosissima

Binomial name
- Acacia spinosissima Benth.
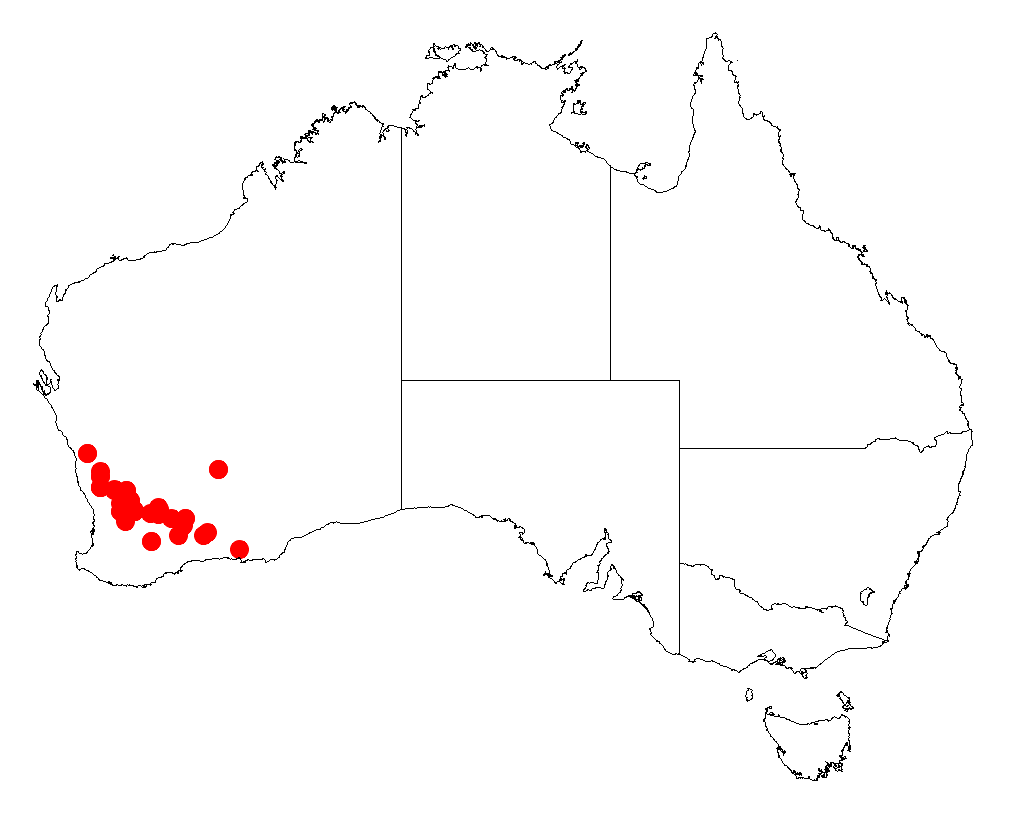
- Occurrence data from AVH

Species of legume

Acacia spinosissima is a shrub of the genus Acacia and the subgenus Phyllodineae native to south western Australia.

== Description ==
The spreading or compact, intricately branched shrub typically grows to a height of 0.2 to 1.5 metres (0.7 to 4.9 ft). It has striate and ribbed branches that are covered in a fine, white powdery coating with many short and spreading branchlets that are a quite spiny and often without phyllodes. Like most species it has phyllodes rather than true leaves. The ascending to erect phyllodes have a narrowly oblong shape and are usually straight or shallowly sigmoid. The green phyllodes usually have a length of 3 to 8 mm (0.12 to 0.31 in) and a width of 1 to 2 mm (0.039 to 0.079 in) with an obscure slightly raised midrib and no lateral nerves. It blooms from August to September and produces yellow flowers. The rudimentary inflorescences occur singly on racemes with an axis length of less than 0.5 mm (0.020 in)and have sperical flower-heads with a diameter of 3 to 3.5 mm (0.12 to 0.14 in) containing 7 to 23 bright lemon yellow coloured flowers. The thinly coriaceous seed pods that form after flowering rounded over the seeds with a length of up to 6 cm (2.4 in) and a width of 3 to 5 mm (0.12 to 0.20 in) and covered in a fine white powdery coating. The dark brown seeds within the pods have an oblong shape with a length of around 2.5 mm (0.098 in).

== Distribution ==
It is native to an area in the Wheatbelt region of Western Australia where it is commonly situated on undulating plains growing in gravelly sandy soils often over or around laterite or loamy to clay soils. Its range extends from around Cadoux in the north to around Brookton in the south and as far east to around Lake King.

== See also ==
- List of Acacia species
