= Acacia ligustrina =

Scientific classification
- Kingdom: Plantae
- Clade: Tracheophytes
- Clade: Angiosperms
- Clade: Eudicots
- Clade: Rosids
- Order: Fabales
- Family: Fabaceae
- Subfamily: Caesalpinioideae
- Clade: Mimosoid clade
- Genus: Acacia
- Species: A. ligustrina

Binomial name
- Acacia ligustrina Meisn.
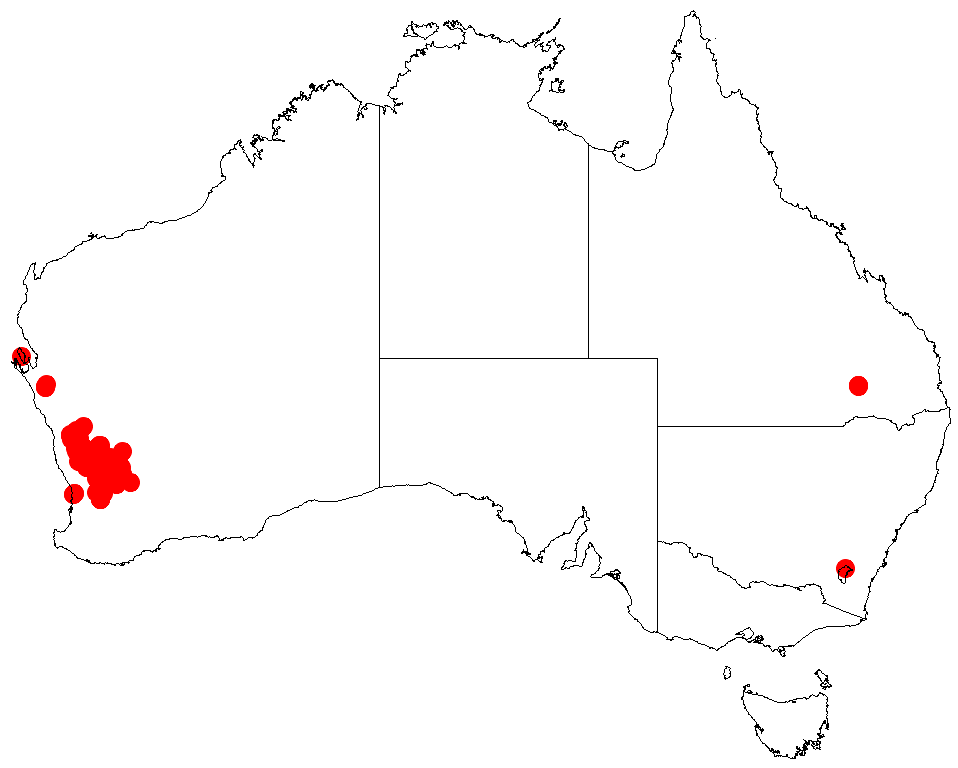
- Occurrence data from AVH

Synonyms
- Racosperma ligustrinum (Meisn.) Pedley

Species of legume

Acacia ligustrina is a species of flowering plant in the family Fabaceae and is endemic to the south-west of Western Australia. It is a spreading shrub or tree with oblong to lance-shaped or narrowly elliptic phyllodes, spherical heads of golden yellow flowers, and curved to irregularly coiled or twisted pods, resembling a string of beads.

== Description ==
Acacia ligustrina is a spreading shrub or tree that typically grows to a height of 1.5–3.5 m (4 ft 11 in – 11 ft 6 in) and has branchlets covered with more or less straight, soft hairs, pressed against the surface. Its phyllodes are asymmetrically oblong to lance-shaped with the narrower end towards the base or narrowly elliptic, 20–60 mm (0.79–2.36 in) long and 3–9 mm (0.12–0.35 in) wide. The phyllodes are thinly leathery, the midvein not prominent and with up to three glands on small projections, the lowest 5–10 mm (0.20–0.39 in) above the pulvinus. The flowers are borne in two spherical heads in axils on peduncles 5–10 mm (0.20–0.39 in) long, each head 4.5–6 mm (0.18–0.24 in) in diameter with 20 to 40 golden yellow flowers. Flowering occurs from August to October, and the pods are curved to irregularly coiled or twisted, appearing like a string of beads, about 40 mm (1.6 in) long, 3–4 mm (0.12–0.16 in) wide and thinly leathery to crusty with a few soft hairs. The seeds are elliptic, 2.5–3.0 mm (0.098–0.118 in) long, shiny dark brown to black, with a bright orange aril, half to fully enveloping the seed.

== Taxonomy ==
Acacia ligustrina was first formally described in 1848 by Carl Meissner in Plantae Preissianae from specimens collected in the Swan River Colony by James Drummond. The specific epithet (ligustrina) means 'Privet-like'.

== Distribution and habitat ==
This species of wattle grows in loamy, clay or sandy clay soils on low hills, around salt flats and depressions, from between Beverley and Brookton to Morawa and Cadoux, with one collection further north-west, in the Avon Wheatbelt, Coolgardie, Geraldton Sandplains and Yalgoo bioregions of south-western Western Australia.

== Conservation status ==
Acacia ligustrina is listed as 'Not threatened' by the Government of Western Australia Department of Biodiversity, Conservation and Attractions.

== See also ==
- List of Acacia species
