= Amery, Western Australia =

Town in the Wheatbelt region of Western Australia

Amery
- Town
- Interactive map of Amery
- Coordinates: 31°08′53″S 117°05′28″E
- Country: Australia
- State: Western Australia
- LGA: Shire of Dowerin
- Location: 175 km (109 mi) NE of Perth, Western Australia; 9 km (5.6 mi) NE of Dowerin
- Established: 1910

Government
  - State electorate: Moore
  - Federal division: Durack
- Elevation: 307 m (1,007 ft)
- Postcode: 6461

Amery is a rail siding and townsite 9 kilometres (5.6 mi) northeast of Dowerin in the Wheatbelt region of Western Australia.

== Railway ==
It was an important junction of the 'Enjanding Northward railway (The earlier name of the Amery to Kalannie railway), going north to Kalannie and the line going east to Wyalkatchem.

Amery was first known as "Ejanding" in 1910. Its name was changed to Amery in 1928, apparently because another railway siding approximately 26 kilometres (16 mi) further north was to be named Ejanding.

== Newspaper ==
A newspaper that included the name of Amery was the Dowerin guardian and Amery line advocate, which was published between 1927 and 1958.
