= Shire of Dowerin =

Local government area in the Wheatbelt region of Western Australia

Coordinates: 31°11′31″S 117°02′02″E

- Local government area
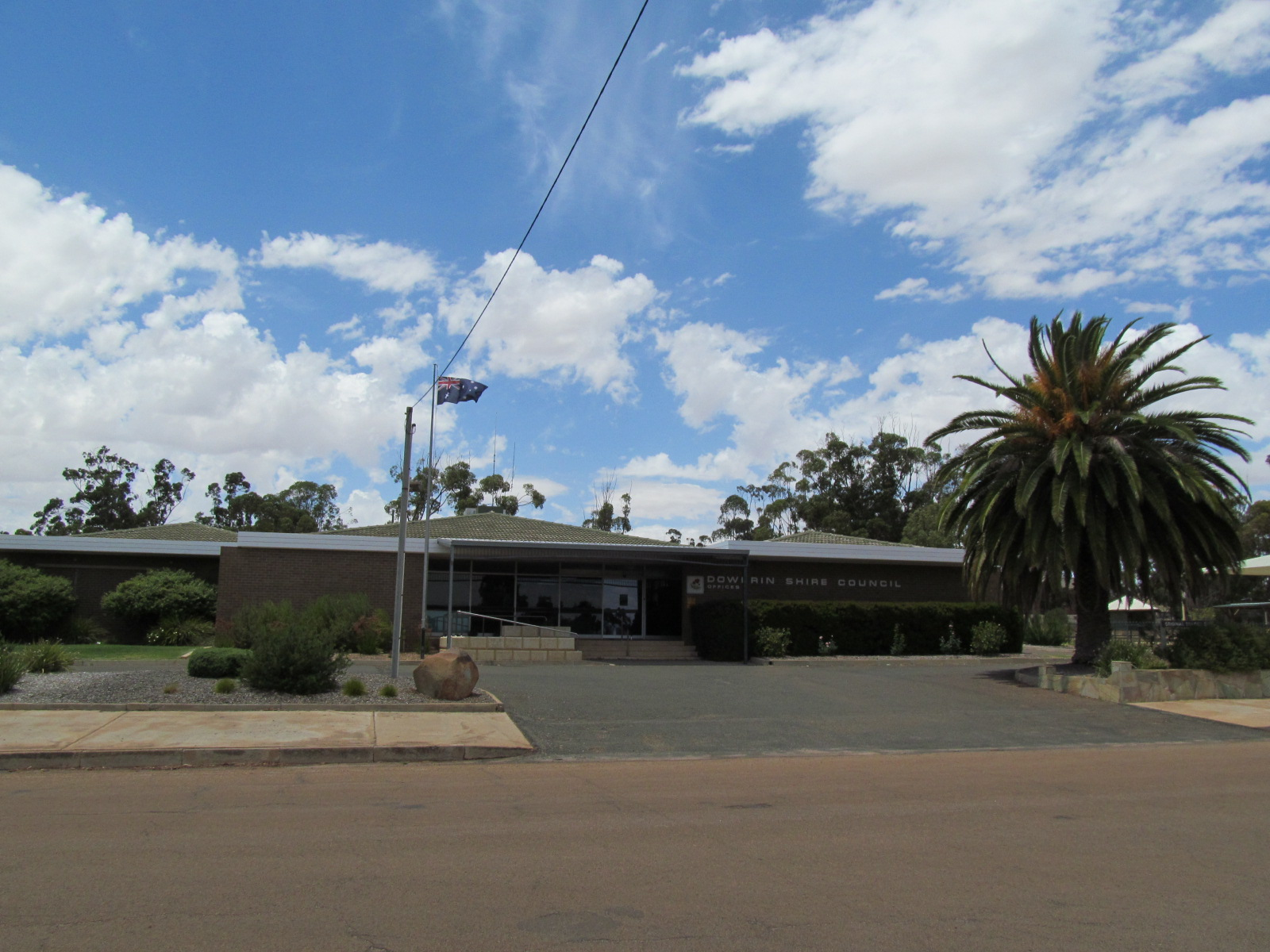
- The Dowerin Shire offices

- Interactive map of Shire of Dowerin
- Country: Australia
- State: Western Australia
- Region: Wheatbelt
- Established: 1911
- Council seat: Dowerin

Government
  - Shire President: Robert Trepp
  - State electorate: Moore
  - Federal division: Durack

Area
  - Total: 1,846.7 km^{2} (713.0 sq mi)

Population
  - Total: 715 (LGA 2021)
- Website: Shire of Dowerin
LGAs around Shire of Dowerin
Wongan-Ballidu	Wongan-Ballidu	Koorda
Goomalling	Shire of Dowerin	Wyalkatchem
Northam	Cunderdin	Cunderdin

The Shire of Dowerin is a local government area in the Wheatbelt region of Western Australia, about 160 kilometres (100 mi) northeast of Perth, the state capital. The Shire covers an area of 1,847 square kilometres (713 sq mi) and its seat of government is the town of Dowerin.

== History ==
On 3 November 1911, the Dowerin Road District was gazetted. On 1 July 1961, it became a shire following enactment of the Local Government Act 1960.

== Wards ==
Council resolved to dissolve Wards in December 2016.

== Towns and localities ==
The towns and localities of the Shire of Dowerin with population and size figures based on the most recent Australian census:

Locality	Population	Area	Map
Dowerin	436 (SAL 2021)	292 km^{2} (113 sq mi)	
Hindmarsh	54 (SAL 2021)	284.6 km^{2} (109.9 sq mi)	
Koomberkine	54 (SAL 2021)	356.6 km^{2} (137.7 sq mi)	
Manmanning	42 (SAL 2021)	417.2 km^{2} (161.1 sq mi)	
Minnivale	40 (SAL 2021)	261.4 km^{2} (100.9 sq mi)	
Ucarty	78 (SAL 2021)	251.1 km^{2} (97.0 sq mi)	

== Former towns ==
- Amery
- Ejanding

== Population ==
Historical population

Year	Pop.	±% p.a.
1921	1,063	—
1933	1,475	+2.77%
1947	1,152	−1.75%
1954	1,311	+1.86%
1961	1,392	+0.86%
1966	1,300	−1.36%
1971	1,071	−3.80%
1976	1,070	−0.02%
1981	998	−1.38%

Year	Pop.	±% p.a.
1986	961	−0.75%
1991	881	−1.72%
1996	817	−1.50%
2001	782	−0.87%
2006	702	−2.14%
2011	678	−0.69%
2016	690	+0.35%
2021	715	+0.71%

== Heritage-listed places ==
As of 2023, 30 places are heritage-listed in the Shire of Dowerin, of which none are on the State Register of Heritage Places.
