= Shire of Wongan–Ballidu =

Local government area in the Wheatbelt region of Western Australia

Coordinates: 30°53′38″S 116°43′08″E

Shire of Wongan-Ballidu
- Local government area
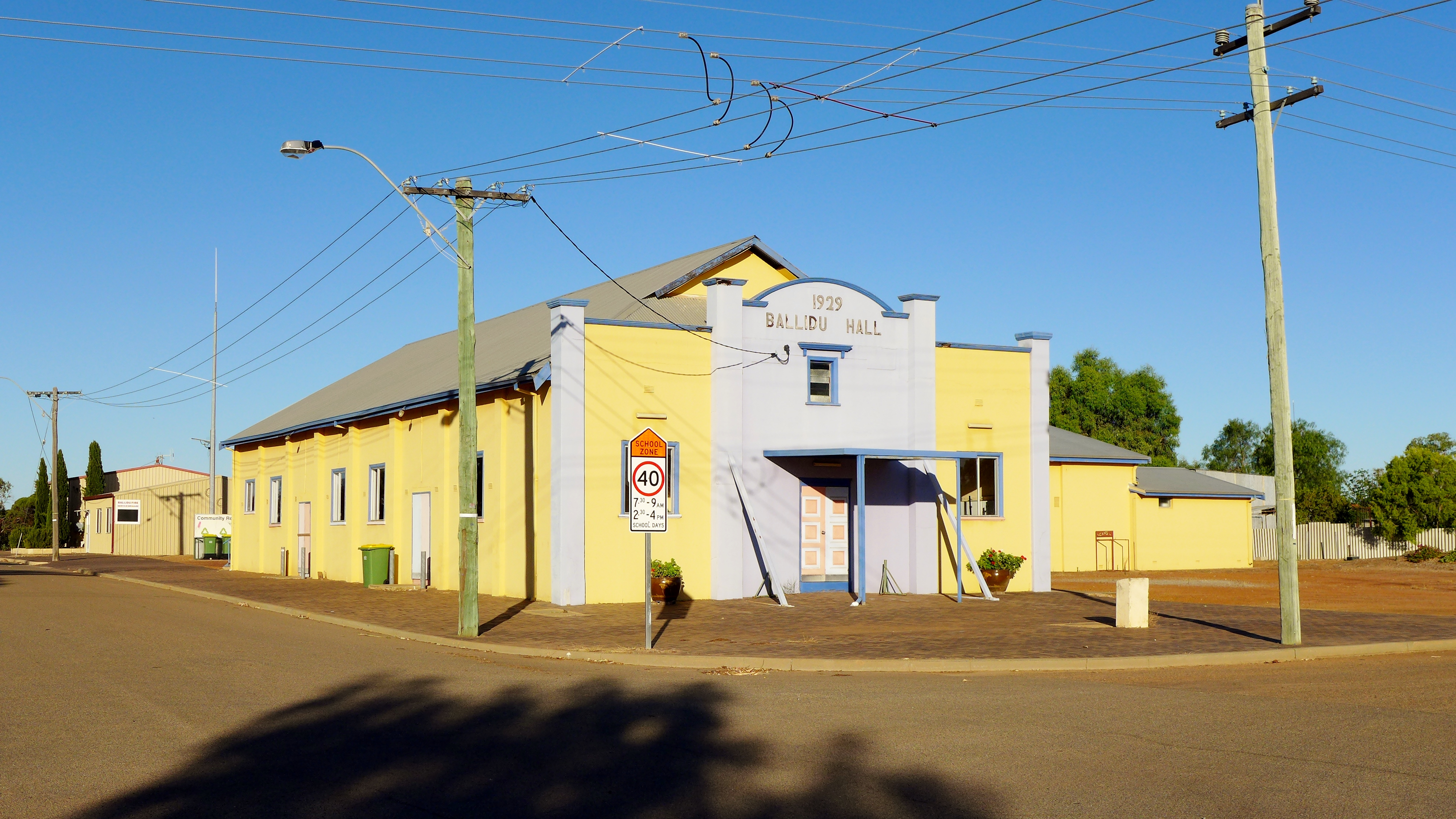
- Ballidu Hall, 2014

- Interactive map of Shire of Wongan-Ballidu
- Country: Australia
- State: Western Australia
- Region: Wheatbelt
- Established: 1887
- Council seat: Wongan Hills

Government
  - Shire President: Mandy Stephenson
  - State electorate: Moore
  - Federal division: Durack

Area
  - Total: 3,368.7 km^{2} (1,300.7 sq mi)

Population
  - Total: 1,297 (LGA 2021)
- Website: Shire of Wongan-Ballidu
LGAs around Shire of Wongan-Ballidu
Moora	Dalwallinu	Koorda
Moora	Shire of Wongan-Ballidu	Koorda
Victoria Plains	Goomalling	Dowerin

The Shire of Wongan–Ballidu is a local government area in the Wheatbelt region of Western Australia, about 180 kilometres (112 mi) NNE of Perth, the state capital. The Shire covers an area of 3,369 square kilometres (1,301 sq mi) and its seat of government is the town of Wongan Hills. The shire includes the Wongan Hills, after which the town is named.

== History ==
On 10 February 1887, the Melbourne Road District was created. It was renamed the Wongan-Ballidu Road District on 18 June 1926. On 1 July 1961, it became a shire following the passage of the Local Government Act 1960, which reformed all remaining road districts into shires.

== Wards ==
As of 3 May 2003, there are ten councillors and no wards. The mayor is directly elected.

== Towns and localities ==
The towns and localities of the Shire of X with population and size figures based on the most recent Australian census:

Locality	Population	Area	Map
Ballidu	58 (SAL 2021)	8.5 km^{2} (3.3 sq mi)	
Burakin	30 (SAL 2021)	342.5 km^{2} (132.2 sq mi)	
Cadoux	56 (SAL 2021)	448.5 km^{2} (173.2 sq mi)	
East Ballidu	35 (SAL 2021)	429.9 km^{2} (166.0 sq mi)	
Kondut	41 (SAL 2021)	510.2 km^{2} (197.0 sq mi)	
Lake Hinds	29 (SAL 2021)	329.5 km^{2} (127.2 sq mi)	
Lake Ninan	17 (SAL 2021)	242.5 km^{2} (93.6 sq mi)	
Mocardy	89 (SAL 2021)	473.5 km^{2} (182.8 sq mi)	
West Ballidu	44 (SAL 2021)	343.3 km^{2} (132.5 sq mi)	
Wongan Hills	896 (SAL 2021)	236.2 km^{2} (91.2 sq mi)	

== Former towns ==
- Kokardine

== Population ==
Historical population

Year	Pop.	±% p.a.
1921	666	—
1933	1,582	+7.48%
1947	1,530	−0.24%
1954	2,048	+4.25%
1961	2,145	+0.66%
1966	2,333	+1.69%
1971	2,243	−0.78%
1976	2,177	−0.60%
1981	2,087	−0.84%

Year	Pop.	±% p.a.
1986	1,922	−1.63%
1991	1,685	−2.60%
1996	1,538	−1.81%
2001	1,503	−0.46%
2006	1,385	−1.62%
2011	1,434	+0.70%
2016	1,331	−1.48%
2021	1,297	−0.52%

== Heritage-listed places ==
As of 2023, 183 places are heritage-listed in the Shire of Wongan–Ballidu, of which five are on the State Register of Heritage Places.
