= Manmanning, Western Australia =

Manmanning
- Town
- Coordinates: 30°51′S 117°06′E
- Country: Australia
- State: Western Australia
- LGA(s): Shire of Dowerin
- Location: 170 km (110 mi) north east of Perth; 37 km (23 mi) east north east of Wongan Hills; 39 km (24 mi) north of Dowerin
- Established: 1929

Government
  - State electorate(s): Moore
  - Federal division(s): Durack

Area
  - Total: 417.2 km^{2} (161.1 sq mi)
- Elevation: 375 m (1,230 ft)

Population
  - Total(s): 42 (SAL 2021)
- Postcode: 6465

Manmanning is a small Wheatbelt town in Western Australia.

The name of the town first appeared on charts drawn in 1907, and was the Indigenous Australian name of a soak located close to the townsite.

The townsite was originally a railway siding on the Ejanding Northward railway and land was set aside for settlers in 1927. The townsite was gazetted in 1929.

The surrounding areas produce wheat and other cereal crops. The town is a receival site for Cooperative Bulk Handling.
