= Ballidu, Western Australia =

Town in the Wheatbelt region of Western Australia

Ballidu
- Town
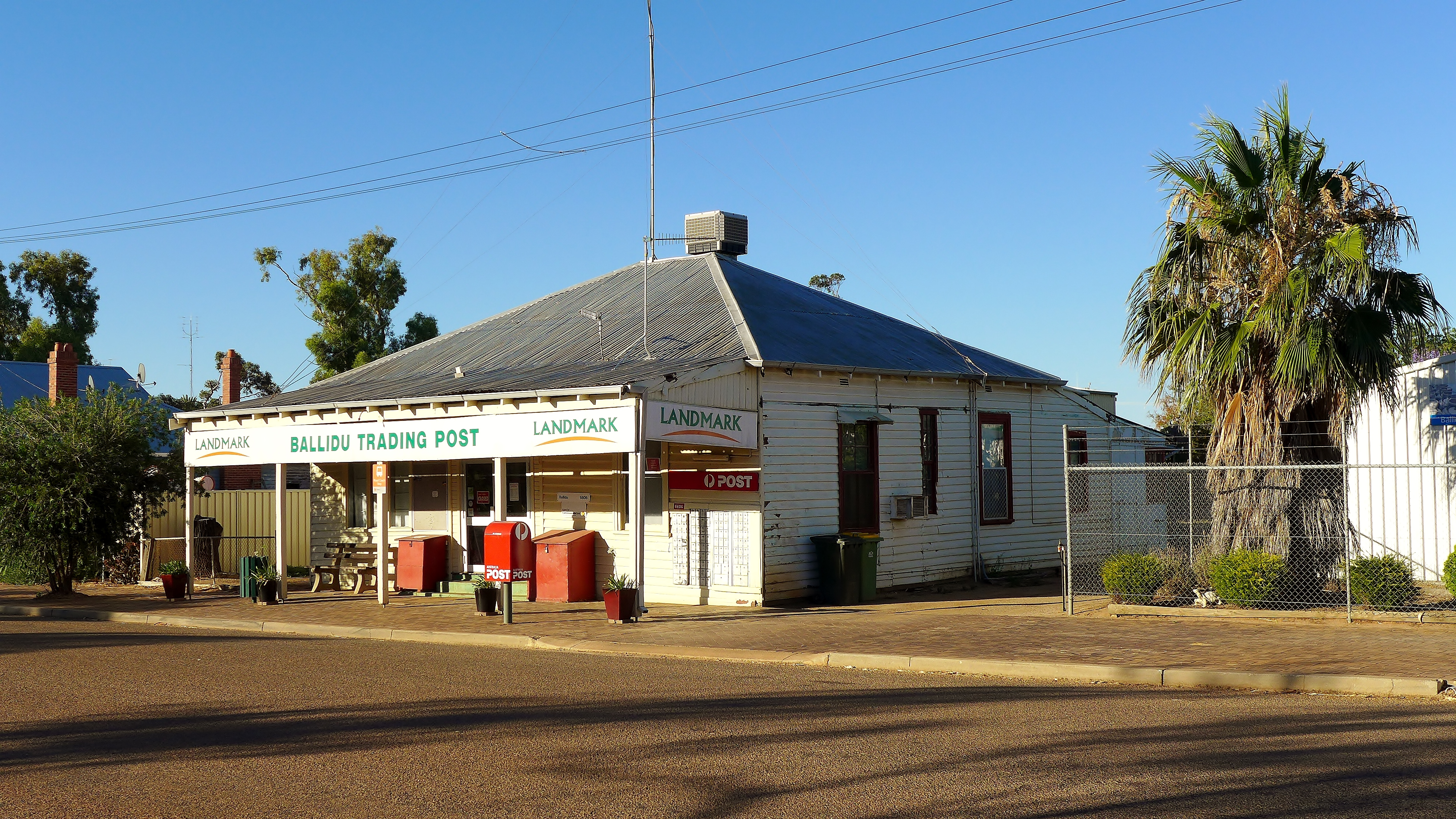
- Ballidu Trading Post, 2014

- Interactive map of Ballidu
- Coordinates: 30.596°S 116.772°E
- Country: Australia
- State: Western Australia
- LGA: Shire of Wongan-Ballidu
- Location: 217 km (135 mi) NE of Perth; 34 km (21 mi) N of Wongan Hills
- Established: 1914

Government
  - State electorate: Moore
  - Federal division: Durack

Area
  - Total: 8.5 km^{2} (3.3 sq mi)
- Elevation: 312 m (1,024 ft)

Population
  - Total: 58 (SAL 2021)
- Postcode: 6606

Ballidu is a town in the Central Midlands division of the Wheatbelt region of Western Australia, about 217 kilometres (135 mi) north of Perth. Ballidu is also 34 kilometres (21 mi) north of the town of Wongan Hills which, along with a few other small towns such as Cadoux and Bindi Bindi make up the Shire of Wongan-Ballidu.

== History ==
The name Ballidu is a hybrid name, coming from "balli", a Noongar word meaning "on this side" or "in this direction", and "Duli" after a nearby rockhole. The townsite was gazetted in 1914, with street names of the original settlers. A primary school opened in the town on 4 September 1922, moving into permanent premises in 1924.

Ballidu is a stop on the Wongan Hills to Mullewa railway line, which opened in 1915.

The bulk wheat bins in town opened in 1940.

== Population ==
Located in the Central Midlands division of the Wheatbelt, the town relies upon agriculture, mainly wheat production. Increasing automation in agriculture has seen the size of surrounding holdings increase and the population of the town steadily decrease. At the 2016 census, Ballidu had a population of 66, down from 82 in 2006. The town retains a primary school, an art gallery, a hall and a general store. 2016 saw a school enrolment of four. The Primary School no longer operates in Ballidu, the grounds are basically abandoned and the football oval is completely overgrown, what students did attend are now dispersed across, Wongan Hills School, Kalanie School and Dalwallinu School(s). (Source, a local editing the page out of boredem).

== Community events ==
=== Bike It To Ballidu ===
The "Bike It To Ballidu" event was established in 1999 by Matt Osborne, and consists of teams cycling, in turn, from Wongan Hills to Ballidu. The ride is approximately 34 kilometres (21 mi) in length, beginning at the Wongan Hills visitor centre, and ending in Alpha Street, Ballidu. At the end, food, beverages, and entertainment are provided in Alpha Park. The event was initially intended as a fundraising activity for the Ballidu Primary School, which closed in 2016 due to low enrolment figures, with the Ballidu Progress Group now managing and coordinating the activity. The ride has occurred each year since 1999, with the exception of 2020 due to the COVID-19 pandemic.

=== Other community activities ===
The Contemporary Arts Society regularly hold exhibitions of local artists and well known Australian artists.
