= Cadoux, Western Australia =

Cadoux
- Town
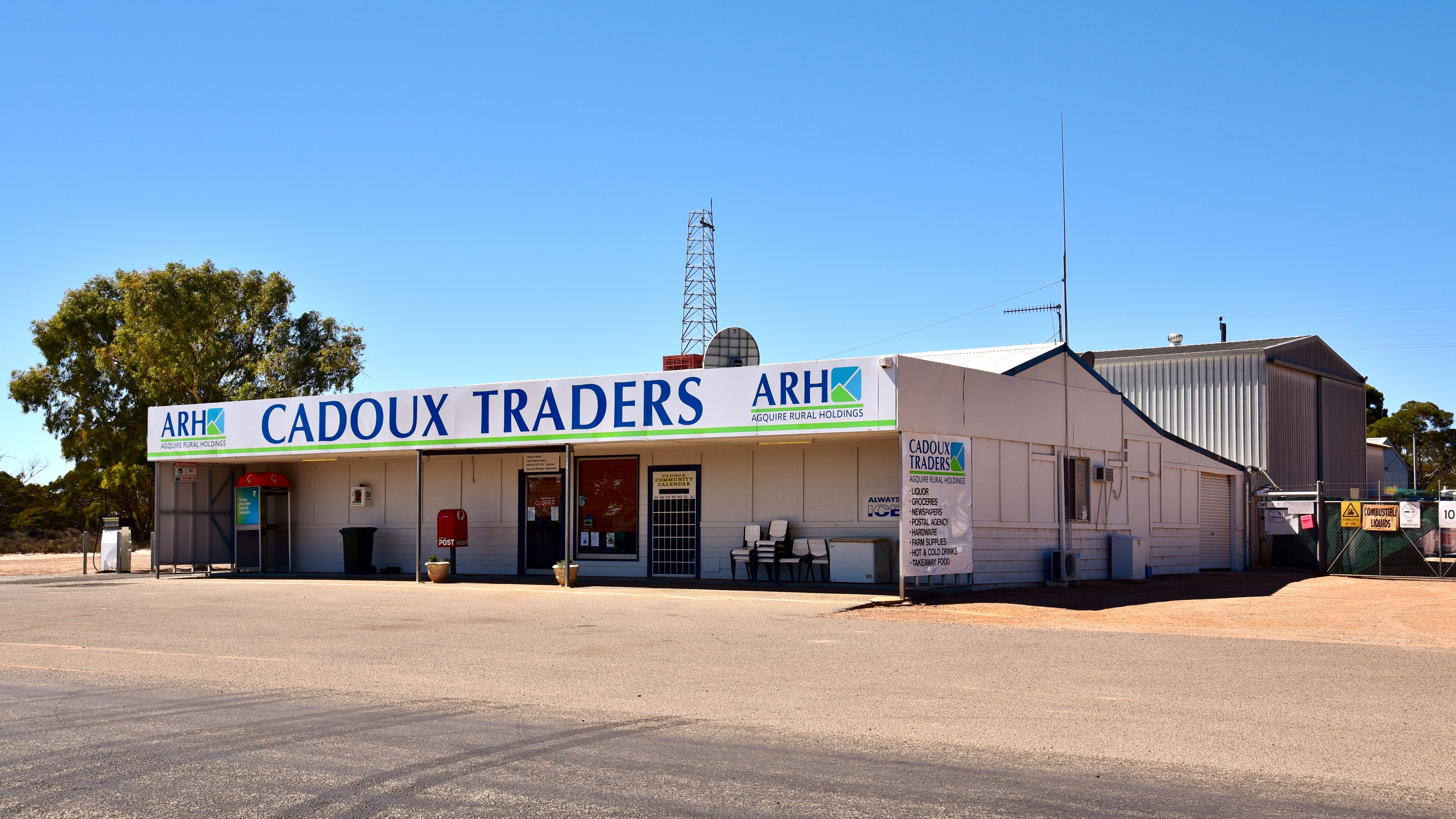
- Cadoux Traders, 2018

- Interactive map of Cadoux
- Coordinates: 30.768°S 117.135°E
- Country: Australia
- State: Western Australia
- LGA: Shire of Wongan-Ballidu
- Location: 180 km (110 mi) from Perth
- Established: 1929

Government
  - State electorate: Moore
  - Federal division: Durack

Area
  - Total: 448.5 km^{2} (173.2 sq mi)
- Elevation: 372 m (1,220 ft)

Population
  - Total: 56 (SAL 2021)
- Postcode: 6466

Cadoux is a small town in the northeastern Wheatbelt region of Western Australia, within the Shire of Wongan-Ballidu. It is approximately 180 kilometres (112 mi) northeast of Perth.

== History ==
The town was named in honour of Donald Cadoux, a French-Canadian settler who arrived in Western Australia in 1909 and was later killed at Gallipoli during the First World War. The local road board secretary had suggested the name "Cado" after the settler, before the spelling "Cadoux" was confirmed.

The Cadoux townsite was gazetted in 1929. A railway siding opened in the same year on the Amery–Kalannie railway line, at 149 miles 49 chains.

Agriculture, particularly wheat production, became the principal industry of the surrounding district. Cadoux developed as a grain receival point, with bulk wheat storage constructed in the town. An H-type grain bin was built in 1936 and an A-type concrete-walled bin was added in 1973. The town remains a CBH Group grain receival site.

Sporting clubs developed alongside the town. The Cadoux Cricket Club was established in 1929. The Cadoux Football Club joined the Koorda Association in 1935. Football ceased during the Second World War before the association was re-established in 1947. The football club later joined the Goomalling association in 1967 but disbanded the following year due to declining support.

The town's development was significantly affected by the 1979 Cadoux earthquake. Four days after the earthquake, approximately 150 residents met and resolved to establish a committee to plan the future development of Cadoux. A seven-member group was appointed to work with the Shire of Wongan-Ballidu on rebuilding and appropriate building standards.

Cadoux is a town in the northeastern Wheatbelt region of Western Australia. It is about 180 kilometres (112 mi) northeast of Perth, within the Shire of Wongan-Ballidu.

The townsite was gazetted in 1929 and the railway siding was opened in the same year. It was on the Amery–Kalannie line at 149 miles 49 chains.

The main industry in town is wheat farming with the town being a CBH Group receival site.

== Cadoux earthquakes ==
Cadoux, and neighbouring Burakin to the north, are considered unusually seismically active for Australia, with minor earthquakes reported on an annual basis. Notable events include in 2001 (Burakin swarm) and in 2022.

The most significant event, however, was on 2 June 1979 with a significant earthquake just east of the town. It had a Richter magnitude of 6.1 and was the second most damaging earthquake in the history of Western Australia. Damage to the area was estimated to be $3.8 million. Only one injury was recorded in the entire earthquake−a broken arm sustained by a child from falling masonry.
