= Wongan Hills, Western Australia =

Town in the Wheatbelt region of Western Australia

Wongan Hills
- Town
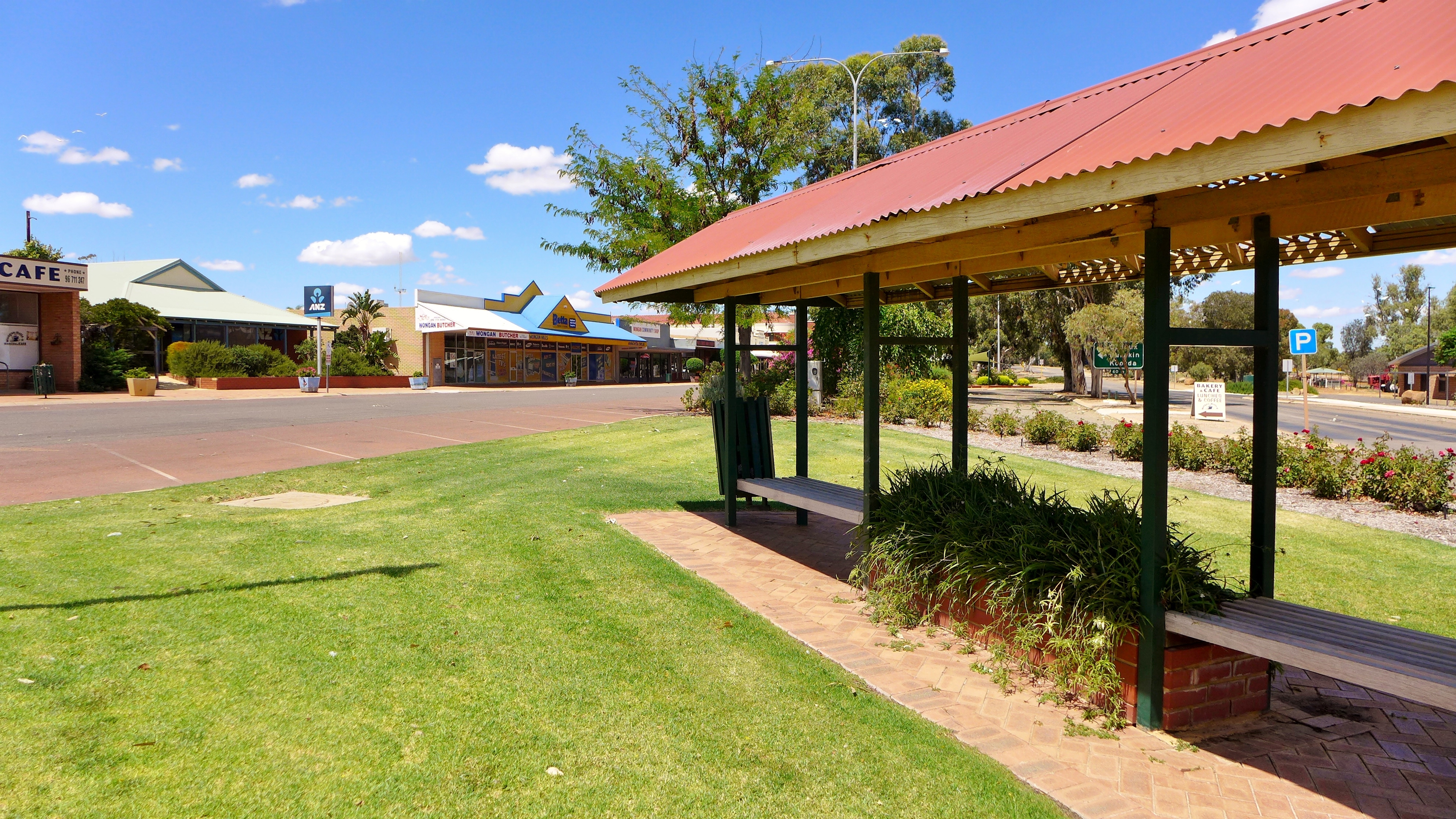
- View of Fenton Place, Wongan Hills, 2016

- Coordinates: 30°54′00″S 116°43′00″E
- Country: Australia
- State: Western Australia
- LGA(s): Shire of Wongan-Ballidu
- Location: 182 km (113 mi) NNE of Perth
- Established: 1911

Government
  - State electorate(s): Moore
  - Federal division(s): Durack

Area
  - Total: 236.2 km^{2} (91.2 sq mi)
- Elevation: 286 m (938 ft)

Population
  - Total(s): 725 (UCL 2021)
- Postcode: 6603
- Mean max temp: 24.9 °C (76.8 °F)
- Mean min temp: 11.5 °C (52.7 °F)
- Annual rainfall: 361.8 mm (14.24 in)

Wongan Hills is a town in the Shire of Wongan-Ballidu, in the Wheatbelt region of Western Australia. The town is approximately 182 km north of the state capital Perth, at an altitude of 286 metres.

The town is named for a nearby range of hills that are found to the north-west of the town, also named Wongan Hills, which was first recorded in 1836 by Surveyor General of Western Australia John Septimus Roe.

== History ==
The area was settled by the 1900s, and in 1911 the town was gazetted and named after the range. "Wongan" is derived from the Indigenous Australian name "wangan-katta", "wanka" and "woongan". "Katta" is known to mean "hill", but the meaning of "wongan" is uncertain. It may be related to "kwongan", an indigenous word for sandplain, or "whispering", in which case "wongan katta" would mean "whispering hills" (katta is a word for hill).

In the early 1900s, poet Lilian Wooster Greaves lived with her family at Wongan Hills. Her book of poetry includes a number of prose and poetry items relating to living there at the time of World War I.

Wongan Hills became the terminus of the railway line from Goomalling, which opened in 1911. The line was extended from the town to Mullewa railway line in 1915.

In 1925, an agricultural research station was established about 5 km north of the town, which assisted in the diversification of and improvements in farm practices through the state. The area is a prosperous agricultural region with activities focused on sheep, grain and pig-farming.

Construction of a grain silo commenced in 1933 as part of the bulk handling scheme that had been introduced by the government and managed by Cooperative Bulk Handling.

As part of Easter celebrations in 2009, a 1.8-by-1.1-kilometre (1.1 by 0.7 mi) cross was laid out in a bare paddock using 460 half-tonne hay bales with the aid of GPS receivers. The cross was set alight on Good Friday night and was the end of a pilgrimage conducted on Easter Saturday.

== Climate ==
Wongan Hills historically had a Mediterranean climate (Köppen Csa) however drying associated with widening of the Hadley cell has shifted the area in recent times to a hot semi-arid climate (BSh). The climate is similar to Northern Hemisphere areas on the southern Mediterranean Sea, such as Tripoli or Gaza City, though Wongan Hills' inland location produces hotter, less arid summers and cooler winters than those localities. Summers are hot to sweltering and generally arid, though occasionally tropical cyclones from the Indian Ocean will affect the region after moving inland, whilst winters are comfortable with cold nights and occasional showers.

Climate data for Wongan Hills
Month	Jan	Feb	Mar	Apr	May	Jun	Jul	Aug	Sep	Oct	Nov	Dec	Year
Record high °C (°F)	47.4 (117.3)	47.0 (116.6)	43.5 (110.3)	39.7 (103.5)	34.7 (94.5)	27.5 (81.5)	25.4 (77.7)	32.4 (90.3)	35.4 (95.7)	39.5 (103.1)	43.2 (109.8)	45.0 (113.0)	47.4 (117.3)
Mean daily maximum °C (°F)	34.8 (94.6)	34.2 (93.6)	31.0 (87.8)	26.5 (79.7)	21.7 (71.1)	18.2 (64.8)	17.2 (63.0)	18.0 (64.4)	20.9 (69.6)	25.4 (77.7)	29.3 (84.7)	32.7 (90.9)	25.8 (78.4)
Daily mean °C (°F)	26.3 (79.3)	26.2 (79.2)	23.7 (74.7)	19.9 (67.8)	15.7 (60.3)	13.0 (55.4)	11.8 (53.2)	12.3 (54.1)	14.2 (57.6)	17.7 (63.9)	21.2 (70.2)	24.2 (75.6)	18.9 (66.0)
Mean daily minimum °C (°F)	17.9 (64.2)	18.2 (64.8)	16.4 (61.5)	13.4 (56.1)	9.9 (49.8)	7.7 (45.9)	6.6 (43.9)	6.7 (44.1)	7.7 (45.9)	10.1 (50.2)	13.2 (55.8)	15.9 (60.6)	12.0 (53.6)
Record low °C (°F)	9.8 (49.6)	8.5 (47.3)	5.5 (41.9)	2.8 (37.0)	−0.6 (30.9)	−0.8 (30.6)	−0.9 (30.4)	−0.5 (31.1)	0.5 (32.9)	0.5 (32.9)	3.4 (38.1)	6.8 (44.2)	−0.9 (30.4)
Average precipitation mm (inches)	14.8 (0.58)	16.1 (0.63)	21.0 (0.83)	21.9 (0.86)	50.6 (1.99)	68.3 (2.69)	69.2 (2.72)	52.2 (2.06)	29.0 (1.14)	19.8 (0.78)	13.2 (0.52)	9.7 (0.38)	386.2 (15.20)
Average precipitation days	2.1	2.4	3.0	4.9	8.7	12.3	13.6	12.3	8.6	5.9	3.5	2.0	79.3
Average relative humidity (%)	24	28	31	38	48	56	58	55	47	34	28	26	39
