= Dowerin, Western Australia =

Dowerin
- Town
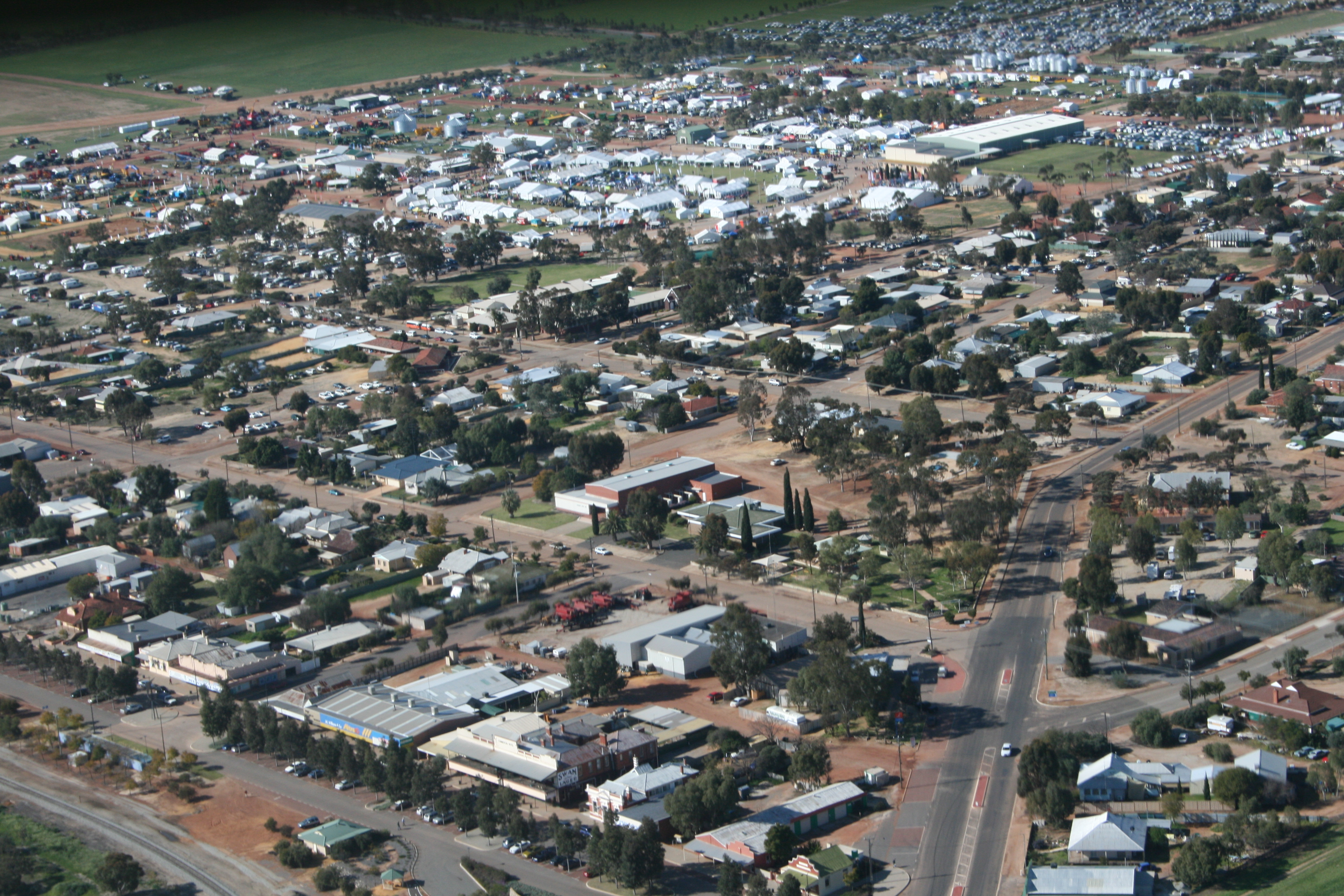
- Photo of Dowerin from the air looking north-east, during the 2007 Dowerin GWN Field Days

- Coordinates: 31.19°S 117.03°E
- Country: Australia
- State: Western Australia
- LGA(s): Shire of Dowerin
- Location: 156 km (97 mi) north-east of Perth
- Established: 1907

Government
  - State electorate(s): Moore
  - Federal division(s): Durack

Area
  - Total: 292 km^{2} (113 sq mi)
- Elevation: 235 m (771 ft)

Population
  - Total(s): 357 (UCL 2021)
- Postcode: 6461

Dowerin is a town 156 kilometres (97 mi) north-east of Perth in the central Wheatbelt region of Western Australia. It is the seat of the Shire of Dowerin.

== History ==
In 1906 the government extended the railway line from Goomalling to the developing Dowerin Agricultural Area and decided to develop a townsite at the terminus. The Aboriginal name of the site chosen was "Wuguni", but "Dowerin", also an Aboriginal name, was already in local use for the place, and was the name gazetted in 1907. The name is derived from nearby Lake Dowerin, first recorded on maps around 1879. One source suggests dowerin is the Aboriginal word for the twenty-eight parrot (dow-arn), and another suggests it means "place of the throwing stick" (dower).

In 1932 the Wheat Pool of Western Australia announced that the town would have two grain elevators, each fitted with an engine, installed at the railway siding.

== Field day ==
Dowerin is home to the Dowerin Machinery Field Day, a two-day annual event (held in the last week of August) showcasing agricultural and associated equipment, as well as providing information and services to people from rural areas. The field day attracts on average in excess of 600 exhibitors as well as over 15,000 local and national visitors each day.

The event was first held as the Dowerin Machinery Field Day on 3 September 1965, and was the result of meetings by the Dowerin Progress Association the previous year that looked at ideas to prevent the town of Dowerin from becoming a ghost town. Some twenty exhibitors and two thousand visitors attended the first field day, with funds raised from the first event going towards funding the construction of a dam and a grassed tennis court. The event continues to be run and managed by the local community, with three full-time staff and 400 volunteers involved in the event's running each year.

From 1992 to 2022, regional television broadcaster GWN7 (until 2011 called the Golden West Network) was the event's naming rights sponsor.

== Theo's run ==
Between 1927 and 1939, the town hosted one of the major racetracks in the state. The Second World War brought an end to the racing and when it started again afterwards, racers moved to a new track on the former Caversham Airfield near Perth. Later, they moved from Caversham to Wanneroo; the track is today known as Wanneroo Raceway.

In May 2007, a vintage car motoring event was run to commemorate the town's history and its association with motor racing in Western Australia. Known as Theo's run, the event is named after a local who raced on the Dowerin track in its heyday in the 1930s and is expected to become an annual event. The 2007 event included a vintage car run from Perth with Jaguar and Riley cars participating.

== Facilities and services ==
Dowerin District High School caters for students up to the level of Year 10. Past this, students wishing to further their education must attend Northam Senior High School, a 40-minute drive away. The school has a performing arts centre, and a library with a seminar area. The surrounding areas produce wheat and other cereal crops. The town is a receival site for Cooperative Bulk Handling.

Dowerin is served by a Police Station with two Officers based there. Volunteer groups such as DFES and St. John's Ambulance provide further emergency services.

Numerous commercial and sporting establishments are available locally including a bank, roadhouse, pub, butcher, cafe, Post Office and retailers; recreational facilities include a 24hr gym, swimming pool, squash and basketball courts, 4WD track, walking trails, nature reserves and a bird observatory.

Accommodation is available locally with Dowerin Short Stay Accommodation (managed by Dowerin Shire) and also a motel.

== Notable people ==
- Mal Brown – Australian rules football player, WAFL Sandover Medal winner
- Murray Couper – champion WAFL football player, Bernie Naylor Medal winner for leading goal kicker, Prendergast Medal winner
- Lance Franklin – Coleman Medal winner and premiership player for Hawthorn Football Club in 2008 and 2013
- Bianca Giteau (Franklin) – Adelaide Thunderbirds netball player
- Tom Lee – Former player for St Kilda Football Club
- Don Maisey (1915–2005) – federal politician, a founder of WA Farmer's Union
