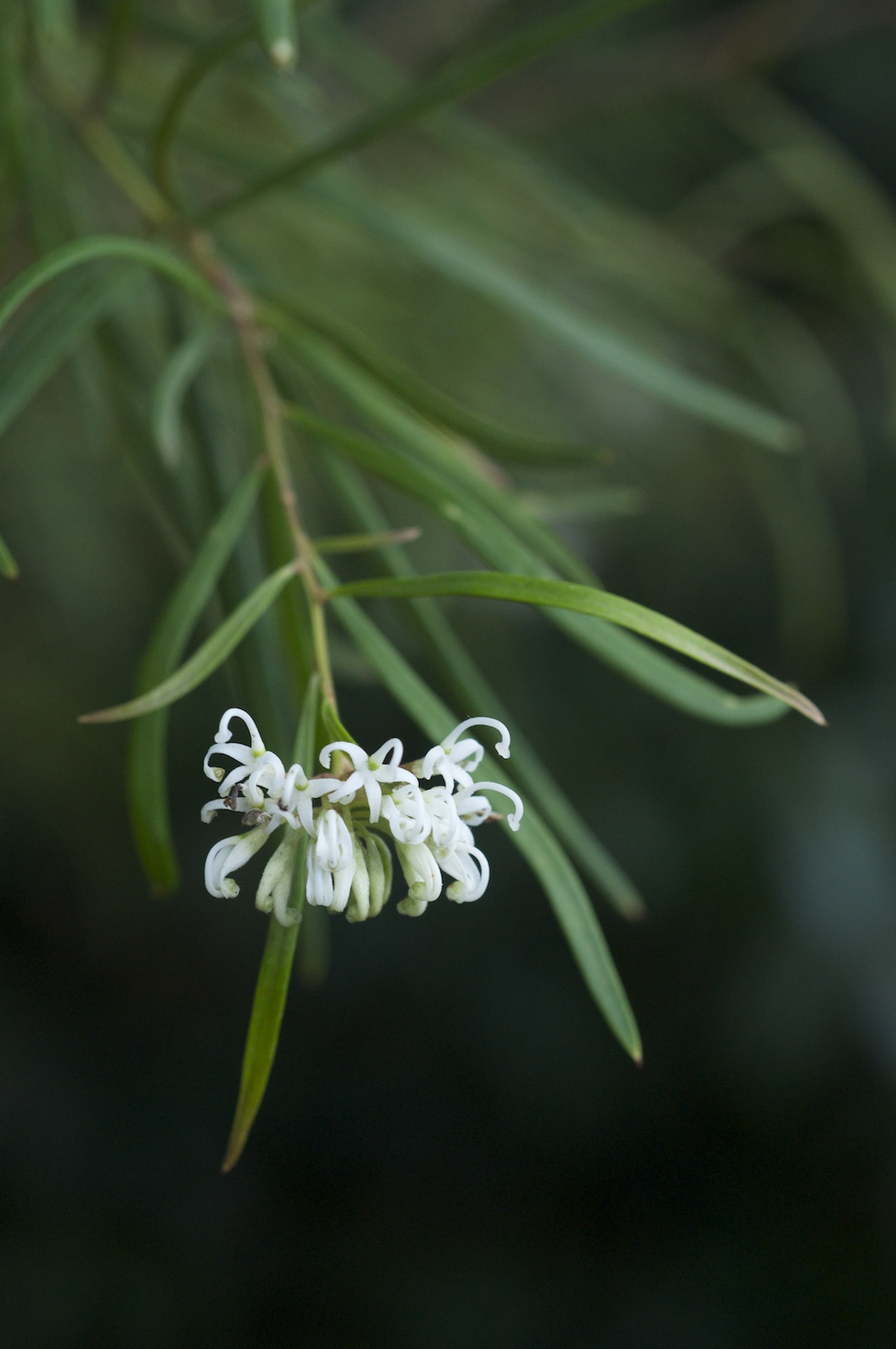
- In the Ku-ring-gai Wildflower Garden, Sydney

Conservation status
- Least Concern (IUCN 3.1)

Scientific classification
- Kingdom: Plantae
- Clade: Embryophytes
- Clade: Tracheophytes
- Clade: Angiosperms
- Clade: Eudicots
- Order: Proteales
- Family: Proteaceae
- Genus: Grevillea
- Species: G. linearifolia

Binomial name
- Grevillea linearifolia (Cav.) Druce

Synonyms
- List: Embothrium lineare Andrews; Embothrium linearifolium Cav.; Embothrium sericeum var. angustifolium Sm.; Grevillea linearifolia f. 'Typical form'; Grevillea linearifolia f. 'e' (Broader-leaved Sydney form); Grevillea linearifolia f. Hawkesbury Sandstone form; Grevillea linearis R.Br. nom. illeg. ? * Grevillea linearis var. alba Page nom. inval., nom. nud. ? * Grevillea linearis var. alba Lodd., G.Lodd. & W.Lodd.; Grevillea linearis var. incarnata Sims nom. illeg.; Grevillea linearis R.Br. var. linearis ? * Grevillea linearis var. rubra Page nom. inval., nom. nud.; Lysanthe linearifolia (Cav.) Knight

= Grevillea linearifolia =

Species of shrub endemic to New South Wales, Australia

Grevillea linearifolia, commonly known as linear-leaf grevillea, is a species of flowering plant in the family Proteaceae and is endemic to New South Wales. It is an open, erect shrub with linear to narrowly elliptic leaves, and clusters of white flowers.

== Description ==
Grevillea linearifolia is an erect, open shrub that typically grows to a height of 1–2 m (3 ft 3 in – 6 ft 7 in) and has ridged, silky-hairy branchlets. Its leaves are linear to narrowly elliptic, mostly 50–90 mm (2.0–3.5 in) long and 1–3 mm (0.039–0.118 in) wide, sometimes arranged singly, or in clusters of three. The flowers are arranged, usually in large groups held above the leaves, on the ends of branches on a peduncle 1–20 mm (0.039–0.787 in) long. The flowers are white, silky-hairy on the outside, sometimes with a faint pink tinge, and the pistil is 7–13 mm (0.28–0.51 in) long with a hooked style. Flowering mainly occurs from August to December, but also sporadically in other months and the fruit is a narrowly oval follicle 13–15 mm (0.51–0.59 in) long.

== Taxonomy ==
This species was first formally described in 1798 by Cavanilles, who gave it the name Embothrium linearifolium in his Icones et Descriptiones Plantarum from specimens collected near Port Jackson. In George Druce changed the name to Grevillea linearifolia in the supplement to The Botanical Exchange Club and Society of the British Isles Report for 1916. The specific epithet (linearifolia) means "linear-leaved".

The taxonomic limits of G. linearifolia are difficult to establish. In addition to variations between populations, the species is said to form "an intergrading complex" with G. parviflora, and may intergrade with G. patulifolia and/or G. humilis subsp. humilis. It is also known to hybridise often with G. sericea, and occasional hybrids with G. diffusa subsp. filipendula have also been reported.

== Distribution and habitat ==
Linear-leaved grevillea grows in moist but well-drained soils, mostly sandy soils over sandstone amongst shrubby eucalypt woodland. It occurs mainly from Gosford and Putty, south to the Parramatta River and Port Jackson. There are also some disjunct populations that differ slightly from the Gosford form, but have been placed provisionally in this species. These occur near Lawson in the lower Blue Mountains, just inland from Ulladulla, and near Nowra. Records of the species from Victoria are considered to be to a range of other species, specifically G. alpivaga, G. neurophylla, G. patulifolia, G. gariwerdensis and G. micrantha.
