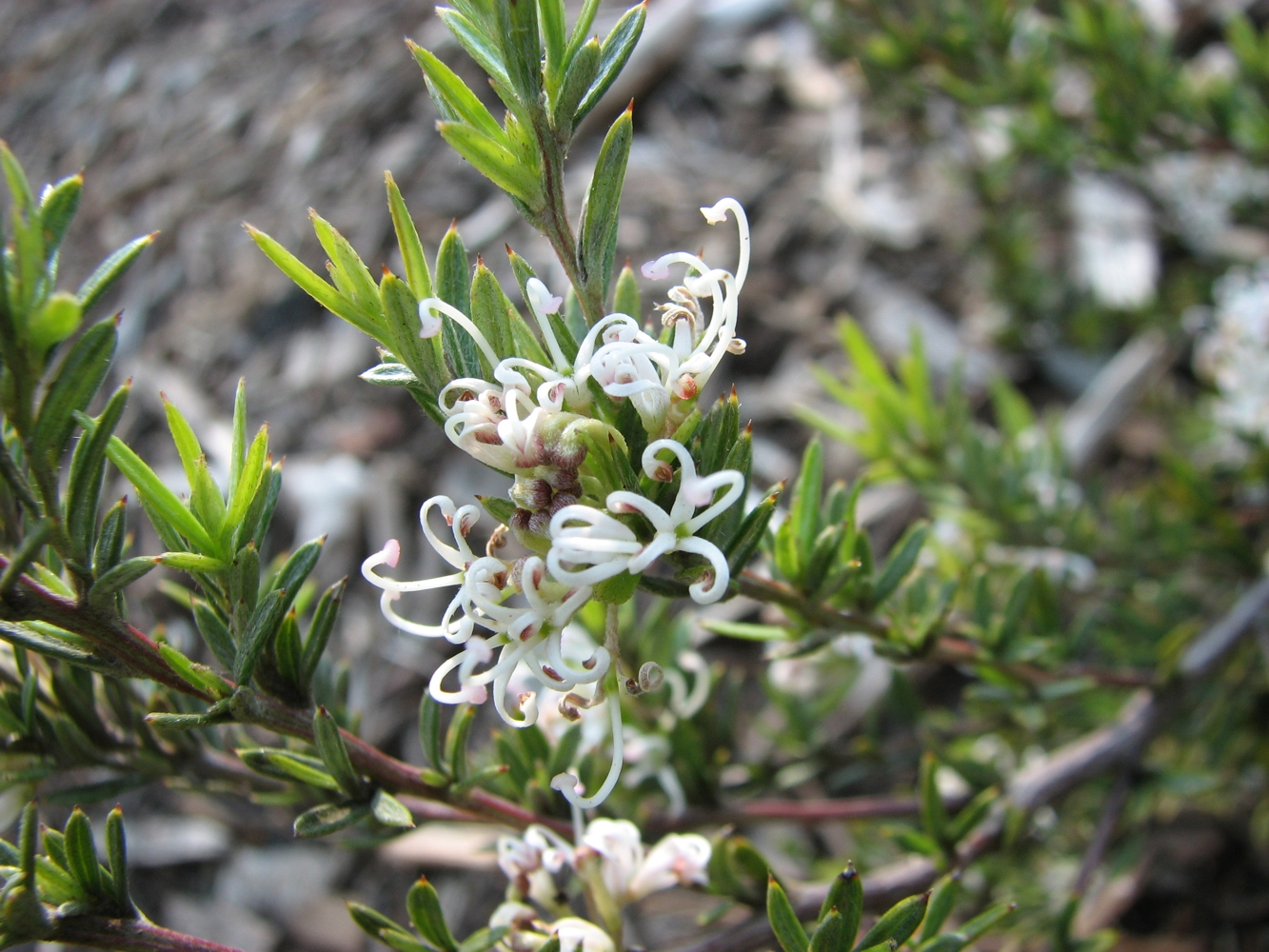
- in the Royal Botanic Gardens Victoria

Scientific classification
- Kingdom: Plantae
- Clade: Embryophytes
- Clade: Tracheophytes
- Clade: Spermatophytes
- Clade: Angiosperms
- Clade: Eudicots
- Order: Proteales
- Family: Proteaceae
- Genus: Grevillea
- Species: G. alpivaga

Binomial name
- Grevillea alpivaga Gand.

Synonyms
- Grevillea linearifolia f. h (Mt Buffalo form)

= Grevillea alpivaga =

Species of flowering plant

Grevillea alpivaga, also known as buffalo grevillea, is a species of flowering plant in the family Proteaceae and is endemic to a restricted area of Victoria, Australia. It is a shrub with crowded, linear leaves and pale green creamy-white flowers.

== Description ==
Grevillea alpivaga is an erect to prostrate shrub that typically grows to a height of 0.7–1 m (2 ft 4 in – 3 ft 3 in) high and has ridged branchlets. Its leaves are crowded, linear, often curved, 8–25 mm (0.31–0.98 in) long and 0.8–1.4 mm (0.031–0.055 in) wide, the edges rolled downwards and the lower surface silky-hairy. The flowers are in sessile groups about 100 mm (3.9 in) long on the ends of branches and are pale green to creamy-white with a white to pink style. The perianth is silky-hairy on the outside, the pistil is 6.5–7 mm (0.26–0.28 in) long . Flowering mainly occurs from October to February and the fruit is slightly warty follicle about 9 mm (0.35 in) long. This species is similar to G. gariwerdensis that has less crowded leaves and a pistil 7.0–8.5 mm (0.28–0.33 in) long, and to G. neurophylla subsp. neurophylla that has longer leaves with a convex upper surface.

== Taxonomy ==
Grevillea alpivaga was first formally described by French botanist Michel Gandoger in the Bulletin de la Société Botanique de France in 1919, from plant material collected from the Victorian Alps by Carl Walter.

== Distribution and habitat ==
Buffalo grevillea occurs in Eucalyptus woodland on granite and sandy soil on Mount Buffalo and towards Porepunkah.

== Conservation status ==
This grevillea is listed as critically endangered on the Flora and Fauna Guarantee Act 1988 Threatened Species List and as rare in Victoria on the Department of Sustainability and Environment's Advisory List of Rare Or Threatened Plants In Victoria.
