= Valle =

Valle may refer to:

- Valle (surname)

== Geography ==
- "Valle", the cultural and climatic zone of the dry subtropical Interandean Valles of the Andes of Peru, Bolivia, and northwest Argentina
- University of Valle, a public university in Cali, Colombia
- Bale, Croatia, or Valle, a small town and municipality in Istria county, Croatia
- Valle, Ecuador, a town and parish in Cuenca Canton, Azuay Province, Ecuador
- Valle Department, a department in southern Honduras
- Valle di Cadore, a municipality Belluno, Veneto, Italy
- Valle Parish, an administrative unit of Aizkraukle district, Latvia
- Valle Hundred, a hundred of Västergötland county, Sweden
- Valle, Arizona, United States

=== Norway ===
- Valle Municipality, a municipality in the Setesdal valley in Agder county
- Valle (village), a village within Valle Municipality in Agder county
- Valle, Møre og Romsdal, a village in Ålesund Municipality in Møre og Romsdal county
- Valle, Telemark, a village in Bamble Municipality in Telemark county
- Valle, or Valle-Hovin, a neighborhood in the capital city of Oslo
- Valle Church (Valle), a church in Valle Municipality in Agder county
- Valle Church (Lindesnes), a church in Lindesnes Municipality in Agder county

== Other ==
- Valle's Steak House, an American restaurant
- Valle (restaurant), a Michelin-starred restaurant in San Diego, California
- Valle 1 and Valle 2, thermosolar plants in San José del Valle, Spain
- Valle, the SkiStar company mascot

== See also ==
- Vallé, a surname
- El Valle (disambiguation)
- Della Valle (disambiguation)
- Del Valle (disambiguation)
- Vale (disambiguation)
- Vallée, a surname
- Vallejo (disambiguation)
- Vallely, a surname
- Vallen, a surname
- Valles (disambiguation)
- Valletta (disambiguation)
- Valley (disambiguation)
- Valle, a type of circle dancing in Albania and Kosovo
