= Valee (disambiguation) =

Valee is an american rapper.

Valee or Valée may also refer to:

- Sylvain Charles Valée, Marshal of France
- Valée system, artillery system developed by Sylvain Charles Valée

== See also ==
- Vale (disambiguation)
- Valle (disambiguation)
- Vallé (disambiguation)
- Vallée (disambiguation)
