= Caustic bush =

Caustic bush could refer to many plant species including:

- Grevillea dimidiata, a small tree or shrub which is endemic to Western Australia
- Grevillea pyramidalis, a tree or shrub which is endemic to Western Australia
