= Grevillea cheilocarpa =

Conservation status
- Least Concern (IUCN 3.1)

Scientific classification
- Kingdom: Plantae
- Clade: Embryophytes
- Clade: Tracheophytes
- Clade: Spermatophytes
- Clade: Angiosperms
- Clade: Eudicots
- Order: Proteales
- Family: Proteaceae
- Genus: Grevillea
- Species: G. cheilocarpa

Binomial name
- Grevillea cheilocarpa Makinson

Species of plant endemic to Western Australia

Grevillea cheilocarpa is a species of flowering plant in the family Proteaceae and is endemic to a restricted area in the south-west of Western Australia. It is a shrub with silky-hairy, egg-shaped leaves with the narrower end towards the base, and yellow flowers.

== Description ==
Grevillea cheilocarpa is a shrub that typically grows to a height of up to 3 m (9.8 ft). Its leaves are egg-shaped with the narrower end towards the base or spatula-shaped, 12–32 mm (0.47–1.26 in) long and 7–13 mm (0.28–0.51 in) wide, both side densely covered with silvery, silky hairs. The flowers are arranged in cylindrical groups 20–40 mm (0.79–1.57 in) long on the ends of branchlets and are yellow, the pistil 6.5–8.0 mm (0.26–0.31 in) long with long hairs on the back. Flowering has been observed in September and the fruit is a flattened, elliptical follicle 10–12 mm (0.39–0.47 in) long.

== Taxonomy ==
Grevillea cheilocarpa was first formally described in 2000 by Robert Owen Makinson in the Flora of Australia, based on plant material collected in the Dragon Rocks Nature Reserve in 1984. The specific epithet (cheilocarpa) means "beak-fruited", referring to a flange on the fruit.

== Distribution and habitat ==
Grevillea cheilocarpa usually grows in low heath and is only known from the type location and between Hyden and Varley in the Mallee biogeographic region of inland south-western Western Australia.

== Conservation status ==
Although it is only known from two locations and has a restricted distribution, there are no known current major threats to the species. It is listed as not threatened, by the Government of Western Australia Department of Biodiversity, Conservation and Attractions and as least concern on the IUCN Red List of Threatened Species. Increased fire frequency may pose a threat in the future.

== See also ==
- List of Grevillea species
