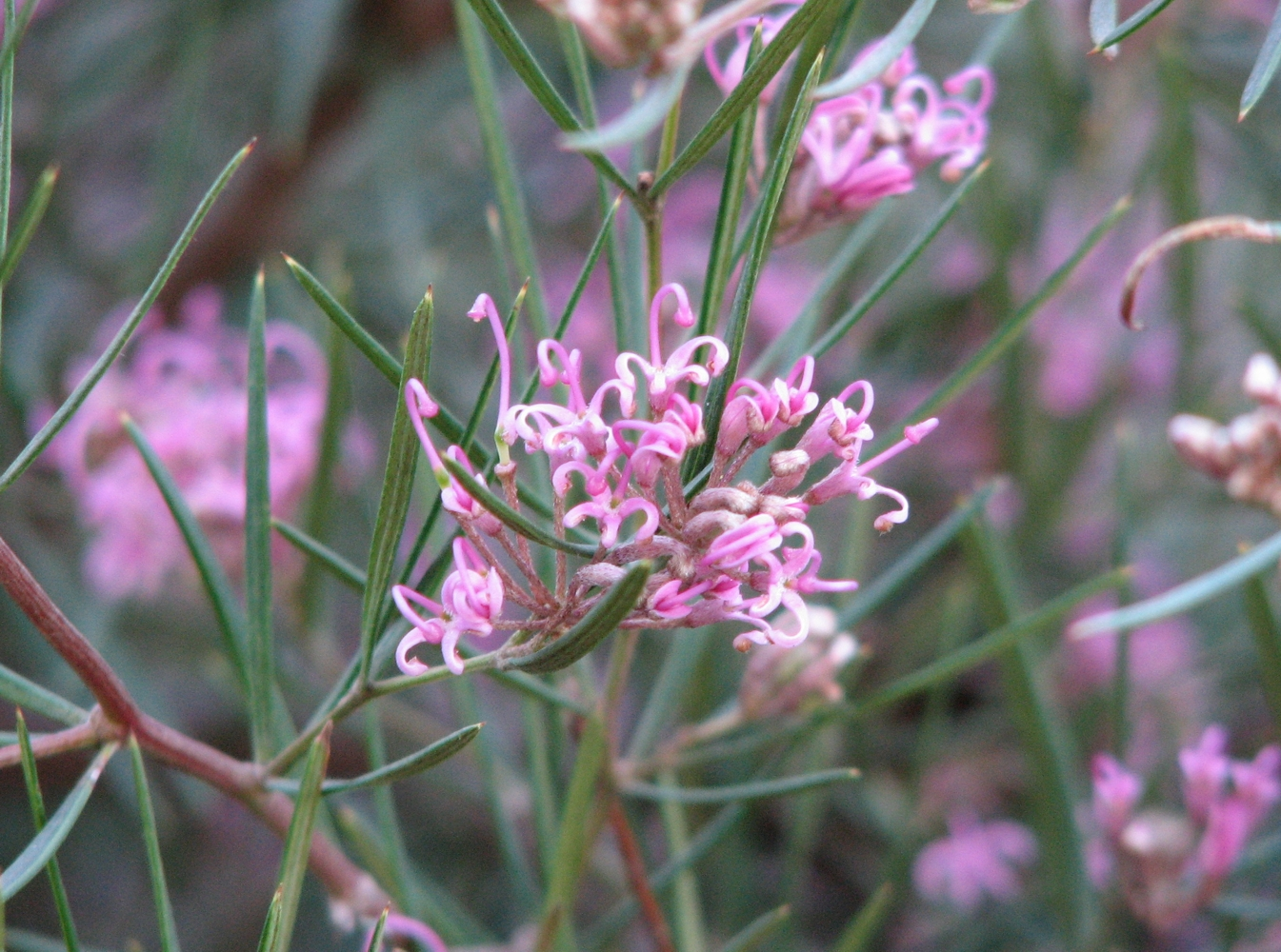

Scientific classification
- Kingdom: Plantae
- Clade: Embryophytes
- Clade: Tracheophytes
- Clade: Angiosperms
- Clade: Eudicots
- Order: Proteales
- Family: Proteaceae
- Genus: Grevillea
- Species: G. gariwerdensis

Binomial name
- Grevillea gariwerdensis Makinson

Synonyms
- Grevillea linearifolia f. 'i' (Grampians form); Grevillea sp. aff. micrantha Grampians; Grevillea. sp. 1

= Grevillea gariwerdensis =

Species of shrub endemic to Victoria, Australia

Grevillea gariwerdensis is a species of flowering plant in the family Proteaceae and is endemic to Grampians National Park in Victoria, Australia. It is a shrub with more or less linear to narrowly oblong leaves, and white to pink flowers with brownish hairs.

== Description ==
Grevillea gariwerdensis is a shrub that typically grows to a height of 0.3–1 m (1 ft 0 in – 3 ft 3 in) and has ridged branchlets with silky hairs between the ridges. Its leaves are more or less linear to oblong or egg-shaped with the narrower end towards the base, 10–30 mm (0.39–1.18 in) long and 1–3 mm (0.039–0.118 in) wide. The flowers are usually arranged on the ends of branchlets in groups of six to sixteen on a peduncle up to 15 mm (0.59 in) long and are white to pink with brownish hairs, the pistil 7–8.5 mm (0.28–0.33 in) long. Flowering occurs from October to January and the fruit is a narrowly oval follicle 9–10 mm (0.35–0.39 in) long.

This grevillea is very similar in appearance to both Grevillea micrantha and Grevillea parviflora.

== Taxonomy ==
Grevillea gariwerdensis was first formally described in 2000 by Robert Owen Makinson in the Flora of Australia from specimens collected near Halls Gap by Alexander Clifford Beauglehole in 1966. The specific epithet (gariwerdensis) refers to the Gariwerd Range, also known as the Grampians Range in Grampians National Park, where this species is endemic.

== Distribution and habitat ==
The species occurs on sandy soils in low moist heaths within Grampians National Park.

== Conservation status ==
Grevillea gariwerdensis is listed as data deficient on the Department of Sustainability and Environment's Advisory List of Rare Or Threatened Plants In Victoria.
