= Juventus FC ultras =

Italian football club fans

The Juventus FC ultras are the organized fans of Italian football club Juventus, from Turin.

== History ==
The first organized groups of Juventus Football Club supporters were established in the middle of the 1970s. The first two groups were called Venceremos and Autonomia Bianconera, and both were on the political left. In 1976 the first two groups of ultras were founded, Fossa dei Campioni and Panthers.

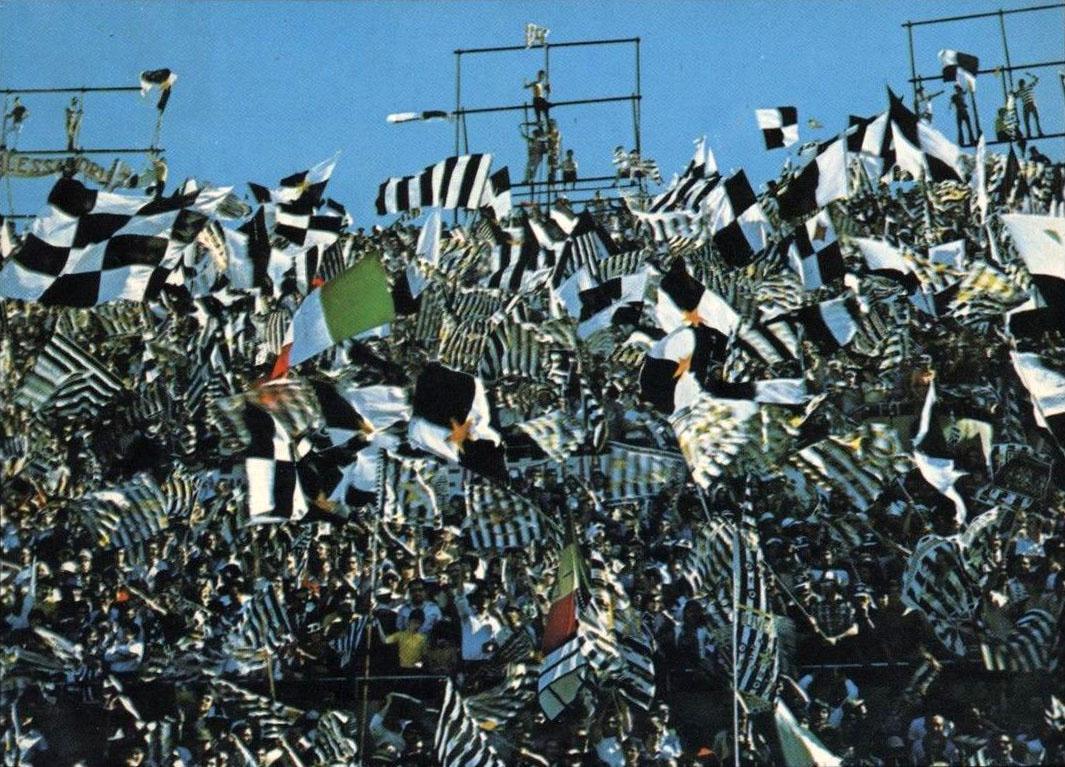
Bianconeri supporters at the ex Stadio Comunale, circa 1973.

One year later, the Gruppo Storico Fighters were founded by Beppe Rossi, an important figure among Juventus supporters.

In the first years of the 1980s, other supporter groups were formed, including Gioventù Bianconera, Area Bianconera and Indians, as well as two extreme ultras groups: the Viking and Nucleo Armato Bianconero (N.A.B.). (Note: The Nucleo Armato Bianconero (N.A.B.) changed its name to Nucleo 1985 as a consequence of the Heysel Stadium Disaster on 29 May 1985.) In 1987 the Gruppo Storico Fighters were dissolved as consequence of conflicts between Juventus and ACF Fiorentina fans in Florence. Many former members of this group, together with members of other groups such as the Indians and Gioventù Bianconera, formed a new group called Arancia Meccanica, inspired by Stanley Kubrick's A Clockwork Orange, later renamed to Drughi, the Italian name of the gang from the film. Drughi became the largest supporter group, with around 10,000 members between 1988 and 1996.

In 1993 some Drughi members who had previously been members of the Gruppo Storico Fighters decided to reform this group again. In the next four years they fought with Drughi, who became the leading group in La Curva Scirea of the Stadio Delle Alpi, (Note: The southern curve of the Stadio delle Alpi is known as La Curva Scirea in memory of Gaetano Scirea, former Juventus and Italian football team player.) with the result that Drughi hung their banner in the middle of La Curva Scirea while the Fighters had to put theirs to the right.

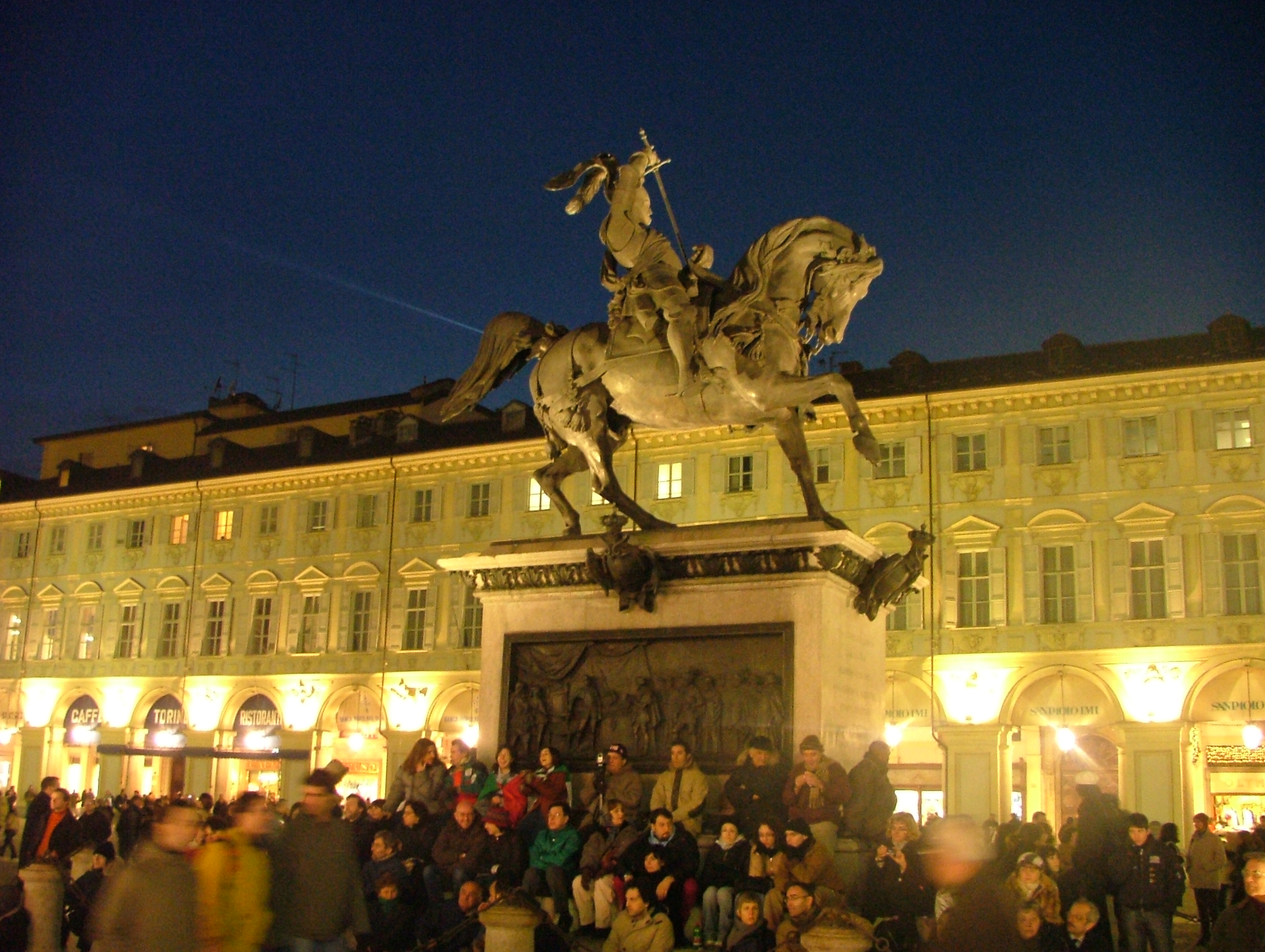
The Caval d'Brons in Piazza San Carlo, the meeting point for Juventus fans at Turin.

In 1997, the Fighters and Drughi, along with other groups in La Curva Scirea, merged together under the name Black And White Fighters Gruppo Storico 1977.

During this period another supporter group, Irriducibili Vallette, gained strong influence in the Curva Nord of the stadium. The group was created in 1990 by a group from the Vallette neighborhood of Turin. They were initially highly organized, replacing Viking as the most powerful group in Curva Nord in 1998, but after many problems, Irriducibili collapsed and no longer exist.

The Curva Sud of the stadium is the main area where the veteran supporter groups attend home matches. They are composed by the most powerful group, Drughi, as well as Viking Juve, Arditi, Nucleo 1985, 06 Clan, Noi Soli, Gruppo Marche 1993 (also knowns as GM), Bruxelles Bianconera (composed by supporters from Belgium and Luxembourg), Gruppo Homer (also knowns as GH), Assiduo Sostegno and Bravi Ragazzi (composed by former Irriducibili members). The Fighters group, the leading group in La Curva Nord, changed their name to Tradizione Bianconera in 2005.

== See also ==
- Football culture
- Major football rivalries
- Tifo

== Bibliography ==
- Bernstein, Alina; Brain, Neil (2003). Sport, Media, Culture: Global and Local Dimensions. Routledge, 183. ISBN 0-7146-5299-7.
- Armstrong, Gary; Giulianotti, Richard (2001). Fear and Loathing in World Football. Berg Publishers. ISBN 1-85973-463-4.
- Giulianotti, Richard; Bonney, Norman; Hepworth, Mike (1994). Football, Violence and Social Identity. Routledge. ISBN 0-415-09838-6.
- Killinger, Charles L. (2005). Culture and Customs of Italy. Greenwood Press. ISBN 0-313-32489-1.
