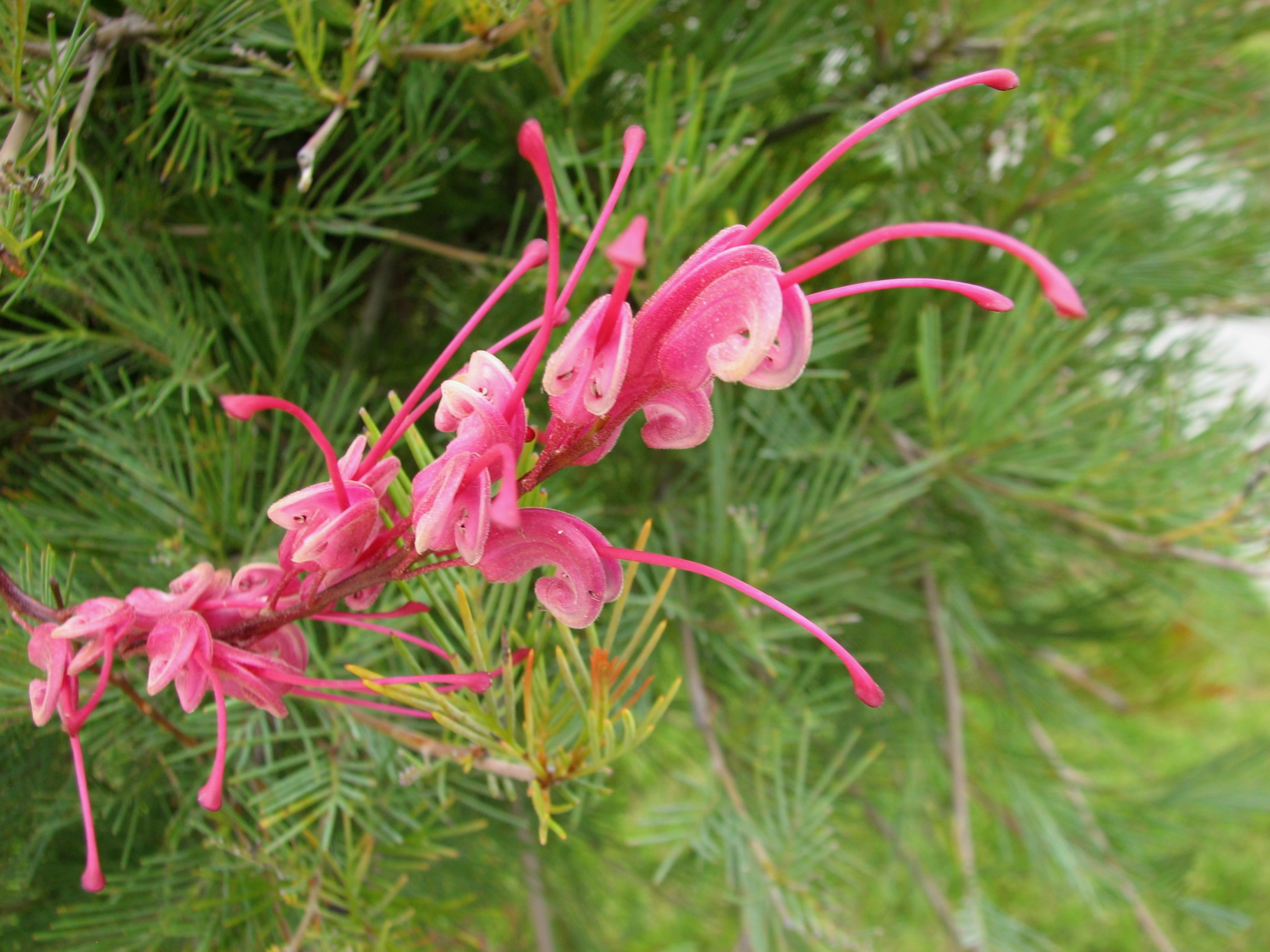
- Grevillea plurijuga 'Purple Haze' in Royal Botanic Gardens, Cranbourne

Scientific classification
- Kingdom: Plantae
- Clade: Tracheophytes
- Clade: Angiosperms
- Clade: Eudicots
- Order: Proteales
- Family: Proteaceae
- Genus: Grevillea
- Species: G. plurijuga

Binomial name
- Grevillea plurijuga F.Muell.

= Grevillea plurijuga =

Species of shrub endemic to Western Australia

Grevillea plurijuga is a species of flowering plant in the family Proteaceae and is endemic to southern Western Australia. It is a prostrate to low-lying or dense mounded to erect shrub with divided leaves with linear lobes and loose clusters of hairy, red or pink flowers.

== Description ==
Grevillea plurijuga is a prostrate to low-lying or dense mounded to erect shrub that typically grows to a height of 0.6–3 m (2 ft 0 in – 9 ft 10 in) and up to 3.5 m (11 ft) wide. Its leaves are 20–130 mm (0.79–5.12 in) long and mostly divided with 8 to 24 linear lobes 20–100 mm (0.79–3.94 in) long and 0.7–1.5 mm (0.028–0.059 in) wide, the edges rolled under, enclosing the lower surface apart from the mid-vein. The flowers are arranged in loose, more or less cylindrical clusters of 8 to 40 on a hairy rachis 20–100 mm (0.79–3.94 in) long. Flowering time and colour varies with subspecies and the fruit is a glabrous, prominently ridged follicle 12–17 mm (0.47–0.67 in) long.

== Taxonomy ==
Grevillea plurijuga was first formally described in 1864 by Ferdinand von Mueller in Fragmenta Phytographiae Australiae from specimens collected by George Maxwell. The specific epithet (plurijuga) means "more yokes", referring to the many leaf lobes.

In 2000, Robert Owen Makinson described two subspecies of G. plurijuga in the Flora of Australia, and the names are accepted by the Australian Plant Census:

- Grevillea plurijuga F.Muell subsp. plurijuga is a prostrate to low-lying, dense, mounded shrub 0.3–2 m (1 ft 0 in – 6 ft 7 in) high with pale grey to pinkish-red and cream-coloured flowers from September to January. The flowers are mostly borne on long, trailing peduncles below the base of the foliage.
- Grevillea plurijuga subsp. superba (Olde & Marriott) Makinson (originally described in 1993 by as Grevillea superba in the journal Nuytsia by Peter Olde and Neil Marriott) is a dense, robust shrub 2–4 m (6 ft 7 in – 13 ft 1 in) high usually with pale grey and cream-coloured or pale yellow flowers from October to December. The flowers are mostly borne on erect peduncles held above the foliage.

== Distribution and habitat ==
Subspecies plurijuga grows in a range of habitats including heath, woodland and mallee between Norseman, Peak Charles, Esperance, and Cundeelee with and outlier near Southern Cross, in the Coolgardie, Esperance Plains and Mallee bioregions. Subspecies superba grows in shrubland between Grasspatch, Scaddan, the Wittenoom Hills and Mount Ney north of Esperance in the Coolgardie, Esperance Plains and Mallee bioregions of southern Western Australia.

== Conservation status ==
Both subspecies of G. plurijuga are listed as "not threatened" by the Western Australian Government Department of Biodiversity, Conservation and Attractions.
