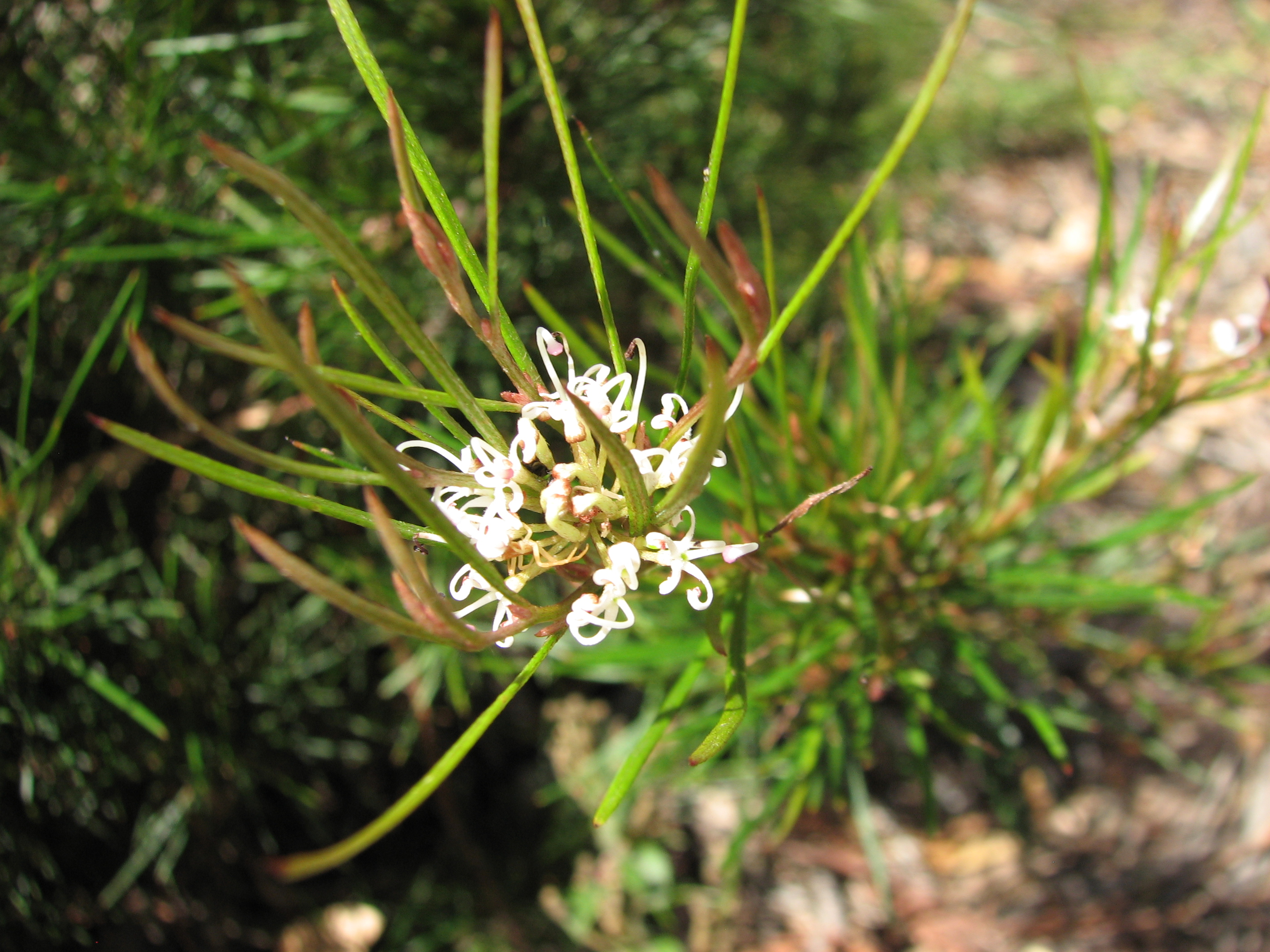
- Grevillea neurophylla subsp. fluviatilis

Scientific classification
- Kingdom: Plantae
- Clade: Tracheophytes
- Clade: Angiosperms
- Clade: Eudicots
- Order: Proteales
- Family: Proteaceae
- Genus: Grevillea
- Species: G. neurophylla

Binomial name
- Grevillea neurophylla Gand.

Synonyms
- Grevillea linearifolia f. 'g' (southern montane form)

= Grevillea neurophylla =

Species of shrub endemic to Victoria, Australia

Grevillea neurophylla, commonly known as granite grevillea, is a species of flowering plant in the family Proteaceae and is endemic to south-eastern continental Australia. It is a spreading to erect shrub with linear leaves, and clusters of white to pale pink flowers with a strongly hooked style.

== Description ==
Grevillea neurophylla is a spreading to erect shrub that typically grows to a height of 1.5–2.6 m (4 ft 11 in – 8 ft 6 in) that sometimes forms root suckers. Its leaves are linear to narrowly elliptic, 25–55 mm (0.98–2.17 in) long and 0.8–2 mm (0.031–0.079 in) wide with the edges rolled under, obscuring most of the lower surface. The flowers are arranged in clusters of eight to twenty 10 mm (0.39 in) long and are white to pale pink, the style strongly hooked and the pistil 6.0–7.5 mm (0.24–0.30 in) long. Flowering occurs from September to February and the fruit is a glabrous follicle 8–10 mm (0.31–0.39 in) long.

== Taxonomy ==
Grevillea neurophylla was first formally described in 1919 by Michel Gandoger in the Bulletin de la Société Botanique de France. The specific epithet (neurophylla) means "nerve-leaved".

In 2000, Robert Owen Makinson described two subspecies of G. neurophylla in the Flora of Australia and the names are accepted by the Australian Plant Census:

- Grevillea neurophylla subsp. fluviatilis Makinson has crowded, erect leaves, the longest usually more than 40 mm (1.6 in) long, the fruit 6.5–8 mm (0.26–0.31 in) long.
- Grevillea neurophylla Gand. subsp. neurophylla has spreading to erect leaves, the longest usually less than 40 mm (1.6 in) long, the fruit 8–10 mm (0.31–0.39 in) long.

== Distribution and habitat ==
Grevillea neurophylla grows in forest or woodland, often in gullies in rocky places near creeks and is found south from the Brindabella Valley and the Australian Capital Territory to eastern Victoria. Subspecies fluviatilis has a narrower distribution than subsp. neurophylla and usually grows at much lower altitudes, often in the flood zone of permanent rivers. In Victoria it occurs in the vicinity of the Bemm, Cann, Genoa and Wingan rivers in East Gippsland in Victoria.

== Conservation status ==
Both subspecies of G. neurophylla are listed as "endangered" under the Victorian Government Flora and Fauna Guarantee Act 1988 and as "rare in Victoria" in the Advisory List of Rare or Threatened Plants in Victoria 2014.
