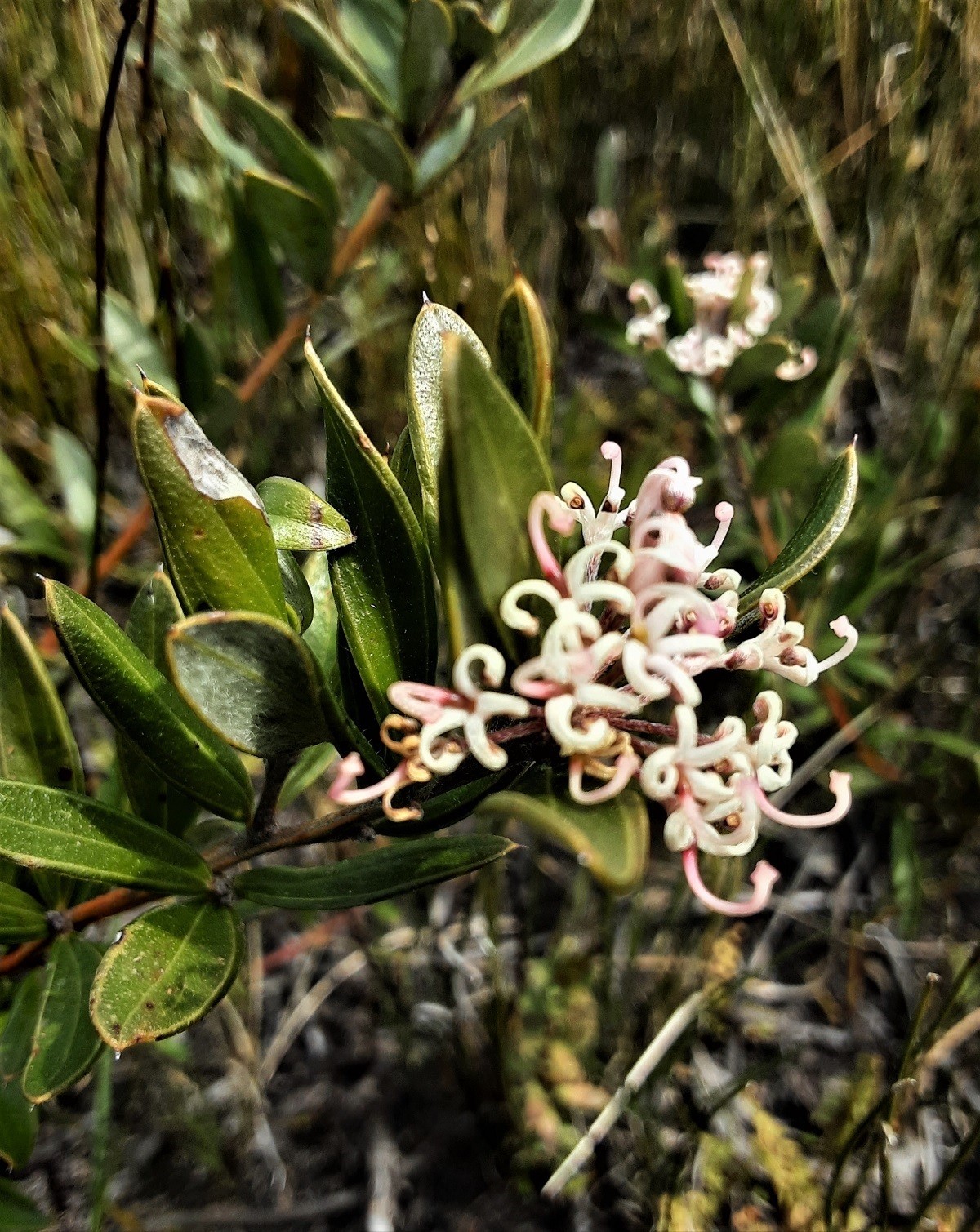
- Near Kanangra Walls

Scientific classification
- Kingdom: Plantae
- Clade: Tracheophytes
- Clade: Angiosperms
- Clade: Eudicots
- Order: Proteales
- Family: Proteaceae
- Genus: Grevillea
- Species: G. imberbis

Binomial name
- Grevillea imberbis Makinson

= Grevillea imberbis =

Species of shrub endemic to New South Wales, Australia

Grevillea imberbis is a species of flowering plant in the family Proteaceae and is endemic to eastern New South Wales. It is a prostrate to low, spreading shrub with egg-shaped to lance-shaped leaves with the narrower end towards the base, and white flowers, sometimes turning pink with age.

== Description ==
Grevillea humilis is a prostrate to low, spreading shrub, that typically grows to a height of 20–40 cm (7.9–15.7 in) and forms a rhizome. Its leaves are egg-shaped to lance-shaped with the narrower end towards the base, or sometimes linear, 10–40 mm (0.39–1.57 in) long and 2–6.5 mm (0.079–0.256 in) wide, the lower surface silky-hairy. The flowers are arranged in clusters of about 4 to 12 on the ends of branches and are white, sometimes turning pink with age, the pistil 6.5–8.5 mm (0.26–0.33 in) long. Flowering occurs from August to February.

== Taxonomy ==
Grevillea imberbis was first formally described in 2000 by Robert Owen Makinson in the Flora of Australia from specimens collected by Roger Coveny near Kanangra Walls in 1973. The specific epithet (imberbis) means "beardless", referring to the lack of a beard on the inner perianth.

== Distribution and habitat ==
This grevillea is only known from the Kanangra Walls area and in the area between Braidwood and Mongarlowe where it grows in heath and on the edges of heathy woodland.
