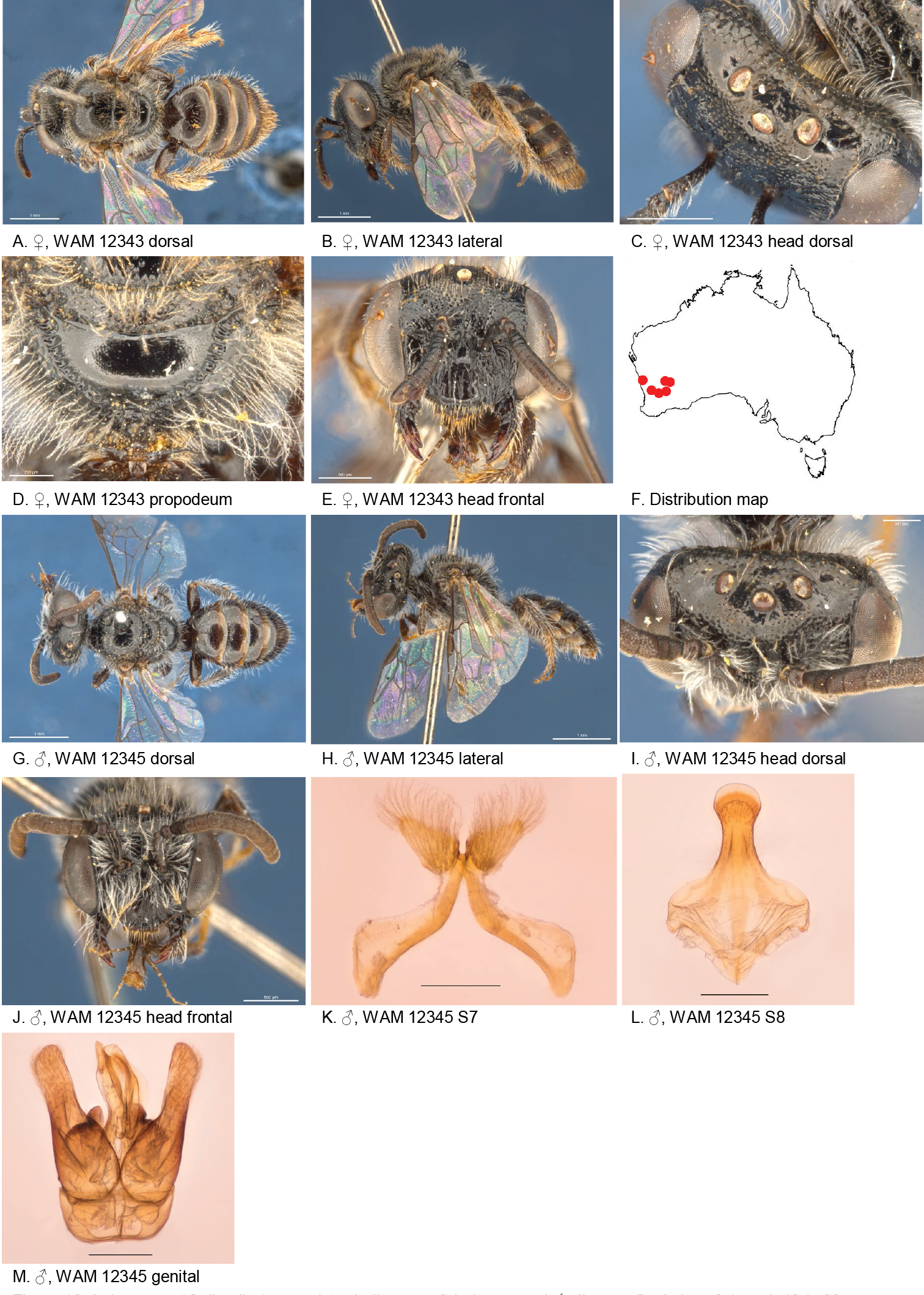
- Female holotype and male allotype

Scientific classification
- Kingdom: Animalia
- Phylum: Arthropoda
- Clade: Pancrustacea
- Class: Insecta
- Order: Hymenoptera
- Family: Colletidae
- Genus: Leioproctus
- Species: L. constrictus

Binomial name
- Leioproctus constrictus Leijs 2018

= Leioproctus constrictus =

Species of bee

Leioproctus constrictus, or Leioproctus (Colletellus) constrictus, is a species of bee in the family Colletidae and subfamily Colletinae. It is endemic to Australia. It was described by entomologist Remko Leijs in 2018.

== Etymology ==
The specific epithet constrictus is an anatomical reference to the strongly depressed post-gradular areas of T2–3 in both sexes.

== Description ==
The female holotype body length is 5.9 mm, head width 1.9 mm; male allotype body length is 4.2 mm, head width 1.52 mm. Integumental colouration is mainly black and brown. The hair is whitish.

== Distribution and habitat ==
The species occurs in Western Australia. The type locality is 16 km west-north-west of Merredin.

== Behaviour ==
The adults are flying mellivores. Flowering plants visited by the bees include Grevillea paradoxa, Grevillea petrophiloides, Eremophila pantonii and Ecdeiocolea monostachya.

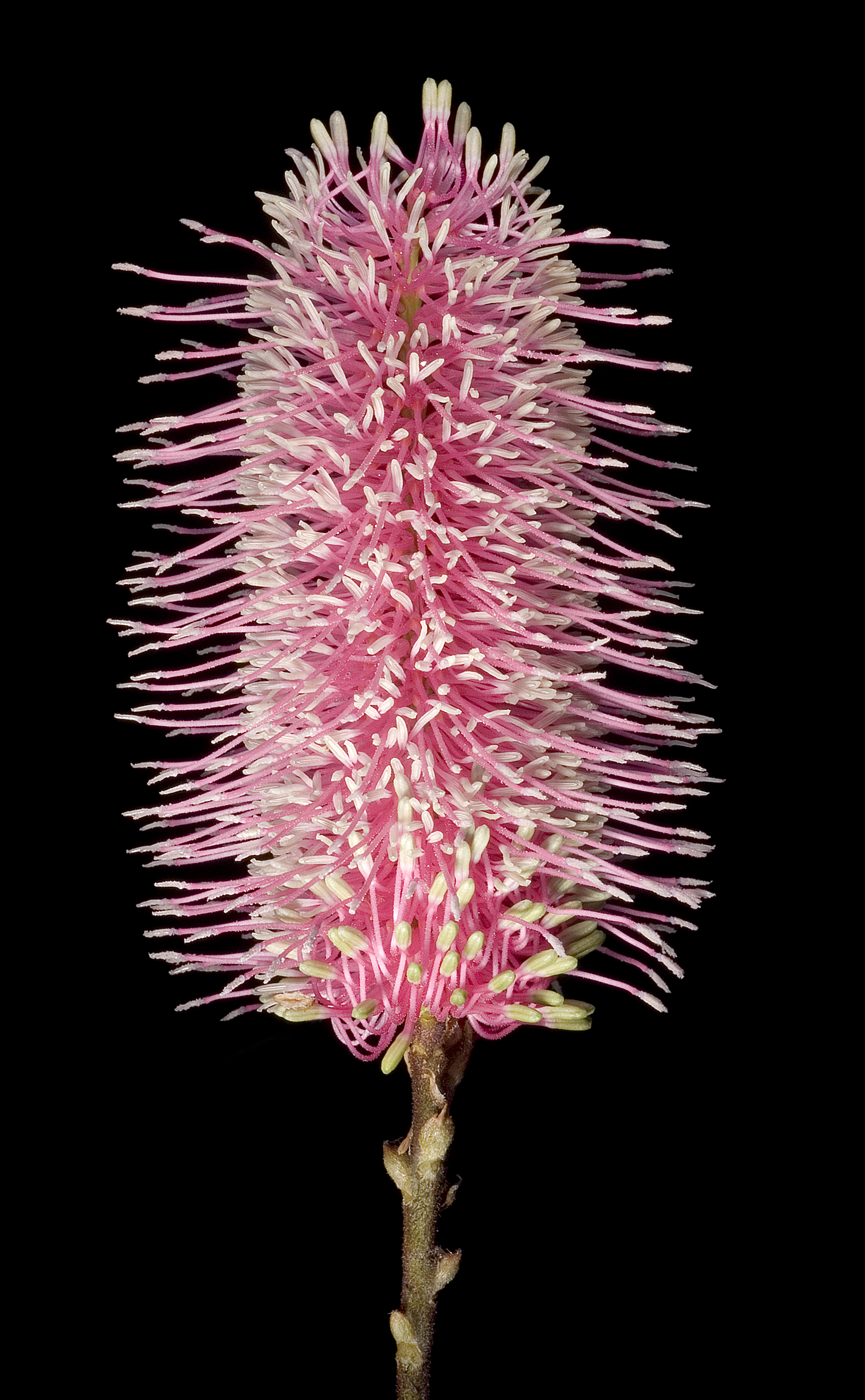
Grevillea petrophiloides flower

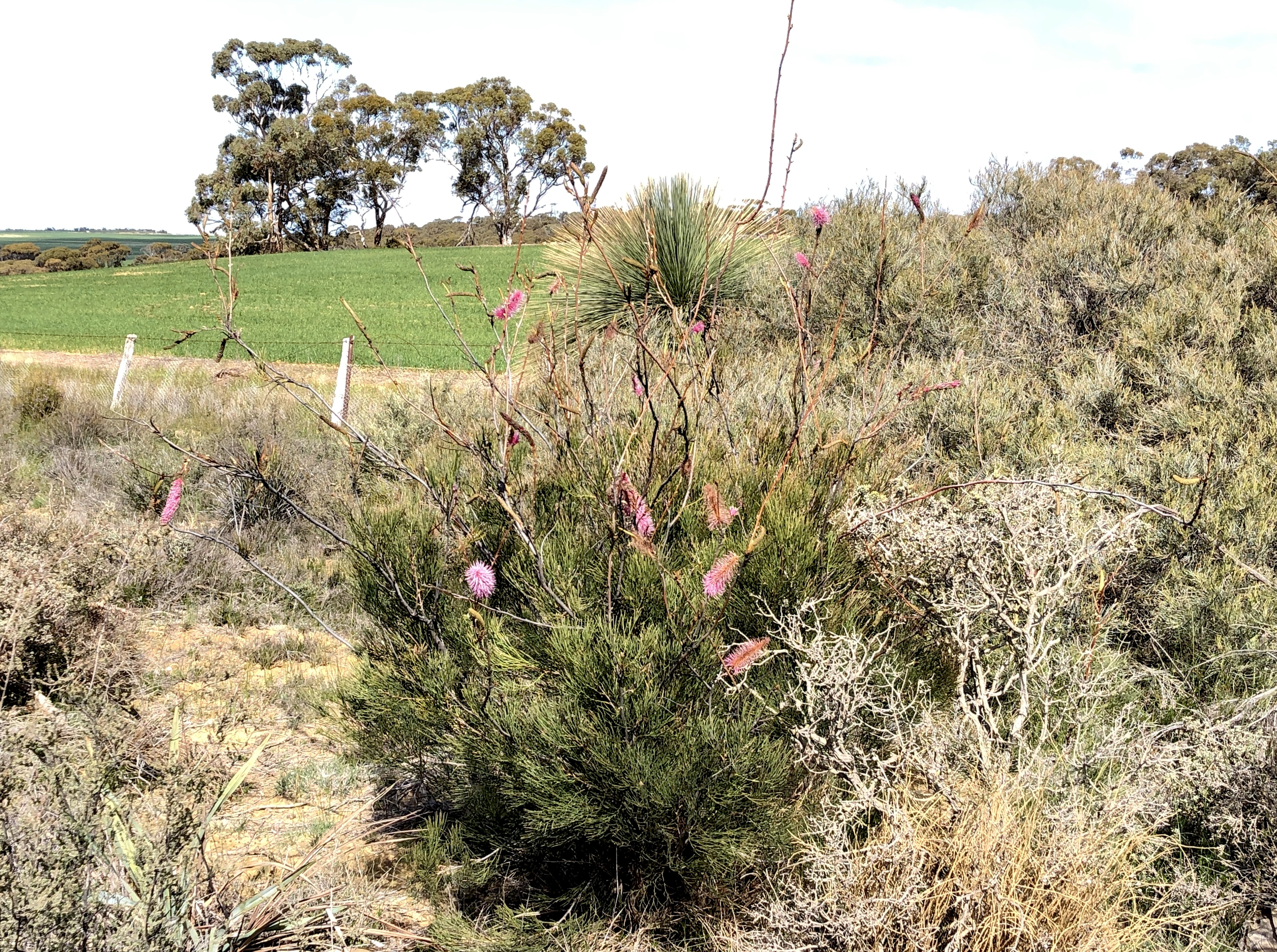
Grevillea petrophiloides (pink pokers), a forage plant of the bees
