= Varley =

Varley (Irish: Mac / Ní / Uí Bhearshúiligh)
- Language: Norman French and Irish Gaelic

Origin
- Meaning: de Verli (of Verli in Normandy, France) or Mac / Ní / Uí Bhearshúiligh (son / daughter / descendent of) the sharp eyed man.
- Region of origin: West Yorkshire & Lancashire, England and Galway & Mayo, Ireland

Other names
- Variant forms: Varley, Varrilly, Varily, Mac / Ní / Uí Bhearshúiligh, Mac / Ní / Uí an Bhearsuiligh, Mac / Ní / Uí Bhearsuiligh, Mac / Ní / Uí a Bhearsula, Mac / Ní / Uí an Bhearlaigh.

Varley is a surname. The surname is either an English surname of Norman origin or an Irish surname of native Irish (Gaelic) origin. In Irish the surname is Mac an Bhearshúiligh (for a man) and Nic an Bhearshúiligh (for a woman) (but also sometimes in Irish it is written as Uí Bhearshúiligh (O'Varley) or Mac / Ní / Uí a Bhearsula or Mac / Ní / Uí an Bhearlaigh.

== Origins ==
As a northern English surname, it originates in Normandy and Picardy in France as an habitational name from Verly in Aisne, Picardy (or from Vesly (La Manche) or Vesly (Eure), or Vrély (Somme), all in Normandy or Picardy (modern day Hauts-de-France) in France), so named from the Gallo-Roman personal name Virilius + the locative suffix -acum. Following the Norman conquest of England in 1066, over the centuries the original Norman French de Verli or de Verley came to be written as Varley. It is said that the Magni Rotuli Scaccarii Normanniae records that Robert de Verlie, Normandy 1180-95 and Robert de Verli held land in Norfolk in 1086. Hugh and William de Verli held lands in Essex and York and later, Torald de Verli gave lands to Salop Abbey, c. 1100. This originally Norman version of the name is overwhelmingly found in West Yorkshire and Lancashire in northern England.

As an Irish surname, it is a Connacht name, found particularly in the counties of Mayo and Galway, with a concentration in the 1901 and 1911 censuses of Ireland around the Mayo-Galway border at Cong, The Neale, An Fháirthí (or Clonbur in the Connemara Gaeltacht), and at Belclare (near Tuam) Foxhall (near Loughrea), Ballinrobe, Kilmaine, Houndswood, Burriscarra, Kilcommon etc. The Irish surname Varley is from the Irish Mac / Ní / Uí an Bhearshúiligh, Mac Giolla Bhearshúiligh, Mac a Bhearsula, or Mac an Bhearlaigh (literally "son / daughter / descendent of the sharp eyed man"). The name was Anglicised variously as Varely, Varily, Varley, Varrilly, Varrelly, Varly, Farley etc. In County Armagh, Mac Giolla Bhearshúiligh was Anglicised as Vallelly and MacIlvallelly. The censuses for England and Wales from 1841 to 1921 show many Varley families were born in Ireland among the majority who were born in England. E.g. in the 1911 census for England and Wales there is a Varley family of 10 all born in County Mayo, Ireland and recorded living in Morley, Leeds, West Yorkshire, England. Almost all people recorded with the surname Varley in the 1901 and 1911 censuses of Ireland were recorded as being able to speak Irish (and more often than not also English).

== Notable people with the surname Varley ==
- Adrian Varley (Irish: Adrian Mac an Bhearlaigh) Gaelic footballer for New York GAA, and Cortoon Shamrocks GAA in County Galway
- Beatrice Varley (1896–1964), British actress
- C. F. Varley (1828–1883), British electrical engineer
- Cornelius Varley (1781–1873), English artist
- Damien Varley (b. 1983), Irish rugby union player for Munster Rugby and Ireland
- Darren Varley (1973–1999), Canadian manslaughter victim
- Declan Varley (born 1965), Irish journalist and author, editor of the Galway Advertiser
- Enda Varley (Irish: Éanna Mac an Bhearlaigh), Gaelic footballer
- Eric Varley (1932–2008), English politician
- Fleetwood Varley (1862–1936), British sport shooter
- Frank Bradley Varley (1885–1929), English politician
- Frederick Horsman Varley (1881–1969), Canadian artist
- Gez Varley, British Techno musician and DJ
- H. Paul Varley (1931–2015), American academic
- Harry Varley (1867–1915), English rugby union footballer
- Henry Varley (1835–1912), English butcher and evangelist
- Isobel Varley (1937–2015), tattooed senior lady
- Jamie Varley, English convicted child murderer
- John Varley (disambiguation), several people of that name

- John Varley (canal engineer) (1740–1809), English canal engineer
- John Varley (painter) (1778–1842), English painter and astrologer
- John Varley (author) (1947–2025), American science fiction author
- John Silvester Varley (born 1956), CEO of Barclays Bank
- John Varley (photographer) (1934–2010), British photographer

- Julia Varley (1871–1952), English trade unionist and suffragette
- Lynn Varley, American comic colourist
- Natalya Varley (b. 1947), Russian film and theatre actress
- Paul Varley (Irish: Pól Mac an Bhearlaigh) Gaelic footballer for Cortoon Shamrocks GAA in County Galway
- Paul Varley (musician) (1949–2008), English musician
- Susan Varley (b. 1961), British children's book illustrator
- Will Varley (b. 1987), English musician
- William Varley (1880–1968), American Olympic rower

== See also ==
- Varley, Western Australia
