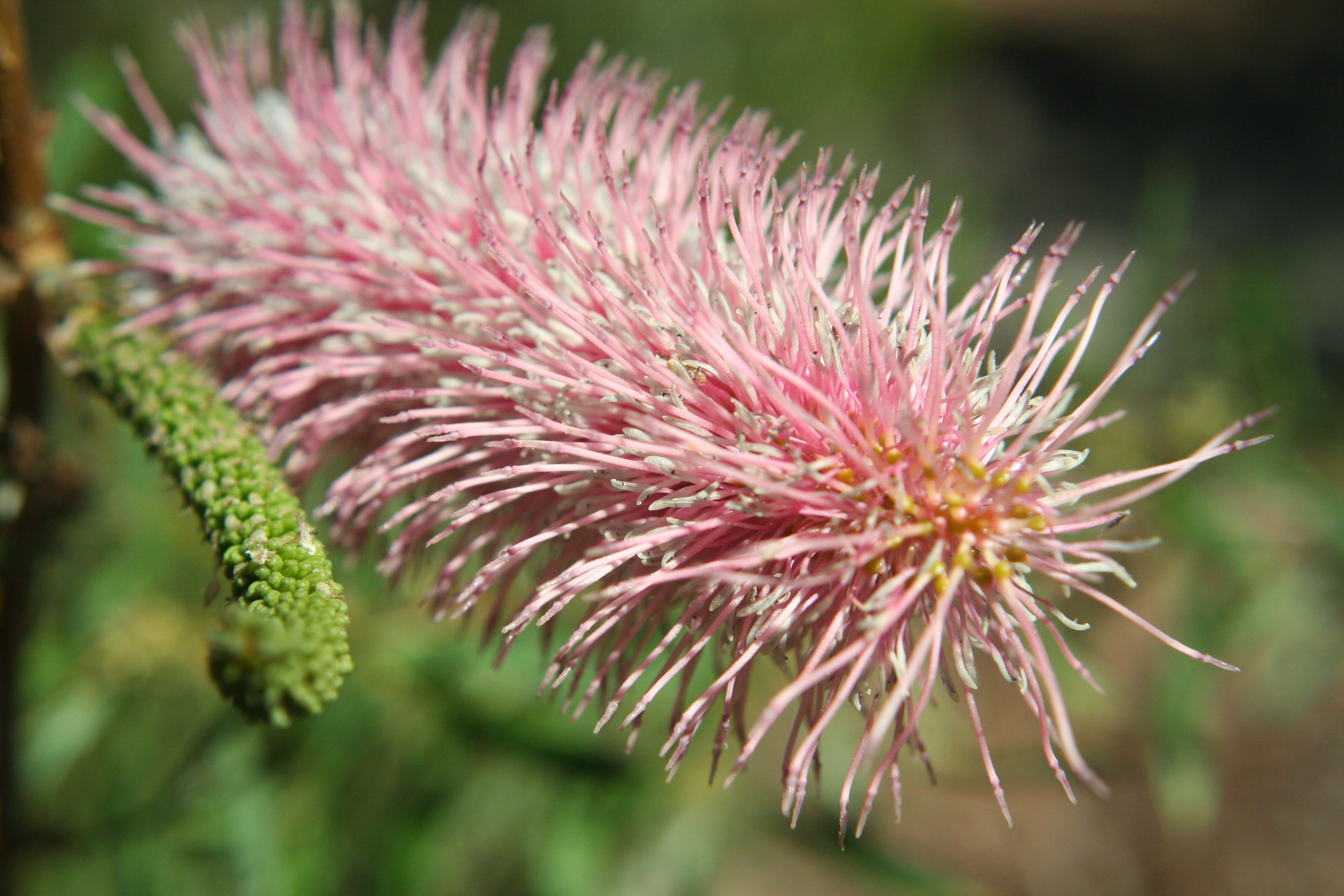

Scientific classification
- Kingdom: Plantae
- Clade: Tracheophytes
- Clade: Angiosperms
- Clade: Eudicots
- Order: Proteales
- Family: Proteaceae
- Genus: Grevillea
- Species: G. petrophiloides

Binomial name
- Grevillea petrophiloides Meisn.

= Grevillea petrophiloides =

Species of shrub endemic to Western Australia

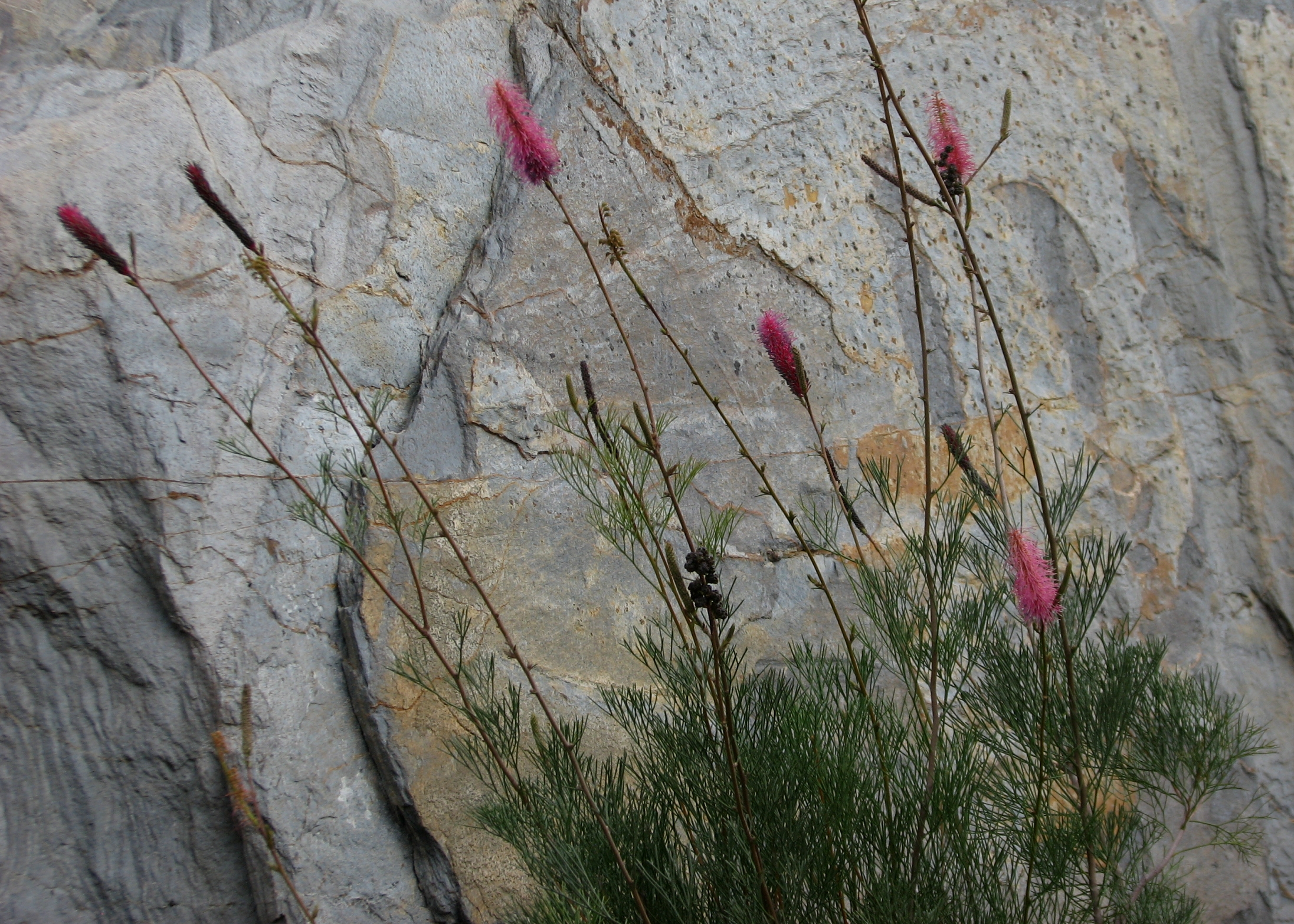
Habit in the Royal Botanic Gardens, Cranbourne

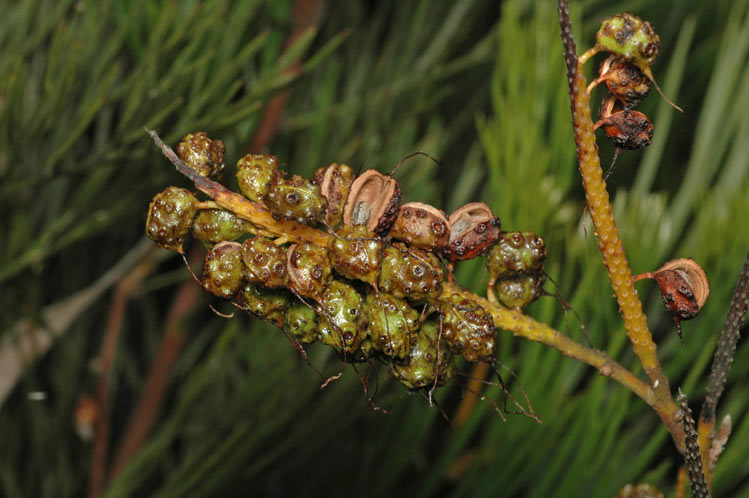
Fruit of subsp. petrophiloides at Australian Botanic Garden Mount Annan

Grevillea petrophiloides, commonly known as pink pokers, rock grevillea or poker grevillea, is a species of flowering plant in the family Proteaceae and is endemic to the south-west of Western Australia. It is an erect shrub with divided leaves, the lobes mostly linear, and cylindrical clusters of usually pink to reddish pink and bluish-grey flowers.

== Description ==
Grevillea petrophiloides is an erect shrub that typically grows to a height of 1–4 m (3 ft 3 in – 13 ft 1 in). Its leaves are 60–250 mm (2.4–9.8 in) long and divided, with three to nine lobes that are sometimes divided again, resulting in more than ten end lobes that are linear, 10–130 mm (0.39–5.12 in) long and 0.5–3.5 mm (0.020–0.138 in) wide. The flowers are arranged in clusters on the ends of sometimes branched canes held above the foliage, the clusters cylindrical on a rachis 60–200 mm (2.4–7.9 in) long. The flowers are usually pink to reddish pink and bluish-grey, varying with subspecies, the pistil 14–21.5 mm (0.55–0.85 in) long. Flowering time varies with subspecies and the fruit is an oval to more or less spherical follicle 7–18 mm (0.28–0.71 in) long.

== Taxonomy ==
Grevillea petrophiloides was first formally described in 1848 by Carl Meissner in Johann Georg Christian Lehmann's Plantae Preissianae based on plant material collected by James Drummond in the Swan River Colony. The specific epithet (petrophiloides) means "Petrophile-like". In 1986, Donald McGillivray described three subspecies of G. petrophiloides in his book New Names in Grevillea (Proteaceae), two of which have been accepted by the Australian Plant Census, and in 2000, Robert Owen Makinson changed to name of Grevillea magnifica subsp. remota Olde & Marriott to G. petrophiloides subsp. remota in the Flora of Australia:

- Grevillea petrophiloides subsp. magnifica McGill. has more than ten linear end leaf-lobes that are circular or triangular in cross-section, 30–120 mm (1.2–4.7 in) long and 0.5–1.0 mm (0.020–0.039 in) wide, mainly flowers from June to August, and has flowers with a straw-white or very pale pink style.
- Grevillea petrophiloides Meisn. subsp. petrophiloides McGill. has more than ten lance-shaped or oblong leaf-lobes that are flat, circular or triangular in cross-section, 20–60 mm (0.79–2.36 in) long and 0.5–2 mm (0.020–0.079 in) wide, flowers in most months with a peak in August and September, and has flowers with a pink or red style.
- Grevillea petrophiloides (Olde & Marriott) Makinson subsp. remota McGill. has fewer than ten linear end leaf-lobes that are circular or triangular in cross-section, 30–120 mm (1.2–4.7 in) long and 0.5–1.0 mm (0.020–0.039 in) wide, mainly flowers from June to October, and has flowers with a straw-white or very pale pink style.

== Distribution and habitat ==
Subspecies magnifica grows on or near granite outcrops mainly between Tammin and Pantapin in the Avon Wheatbelt and Mallee bioregions, subspecies petrophiloides in shrubland or heath on sandplains between the lower Murchison River, Quairading and Hyden in the Avon Wheatbelt, Geraldton Sandplains and Mallee bioregions and subspecies remota grows on or near granite outcrops from near Varley to Norseman in the Avon Wheatbelt, Coolgardie and Mallee bioregions of south-western Western Australia.

== Conservation status ==
Subspecies magnifica and petrophiloides are listed as "not threatened" but subspecies remota is classified as "Priority Three" by the Government of Western Australia Department of Biodiversity, Conservation and Attractions, meaning that it is poorly known and known from only a few locations but is not under imminent threat.
