= El Valle =

El Valle may refer to:

== Places ==
- El Valle, Choco, Colombia
- El Valle, Dominican Republic, a town in Hato Mayor province, Dominican Republic
- El Valle de Antón, a town in Cocle province, Panama
- El Valle de la Unión, a town in Colon province, Panama
- El Valle Golf Resort, a golf resort in Murcia, Spain
- El Valle, Granada, Spain
- El Valle (Carreño), Spain
- El Valle (Candamo), Spain
- El Valle, Nueva Esparta, Venezuela
- El Valle Parish, Caracas, Venezuela

== Other ==
- El Valle (volcano)

== See also ==
- Valle (disambiguation)
- Del Valle (disambiguation)
