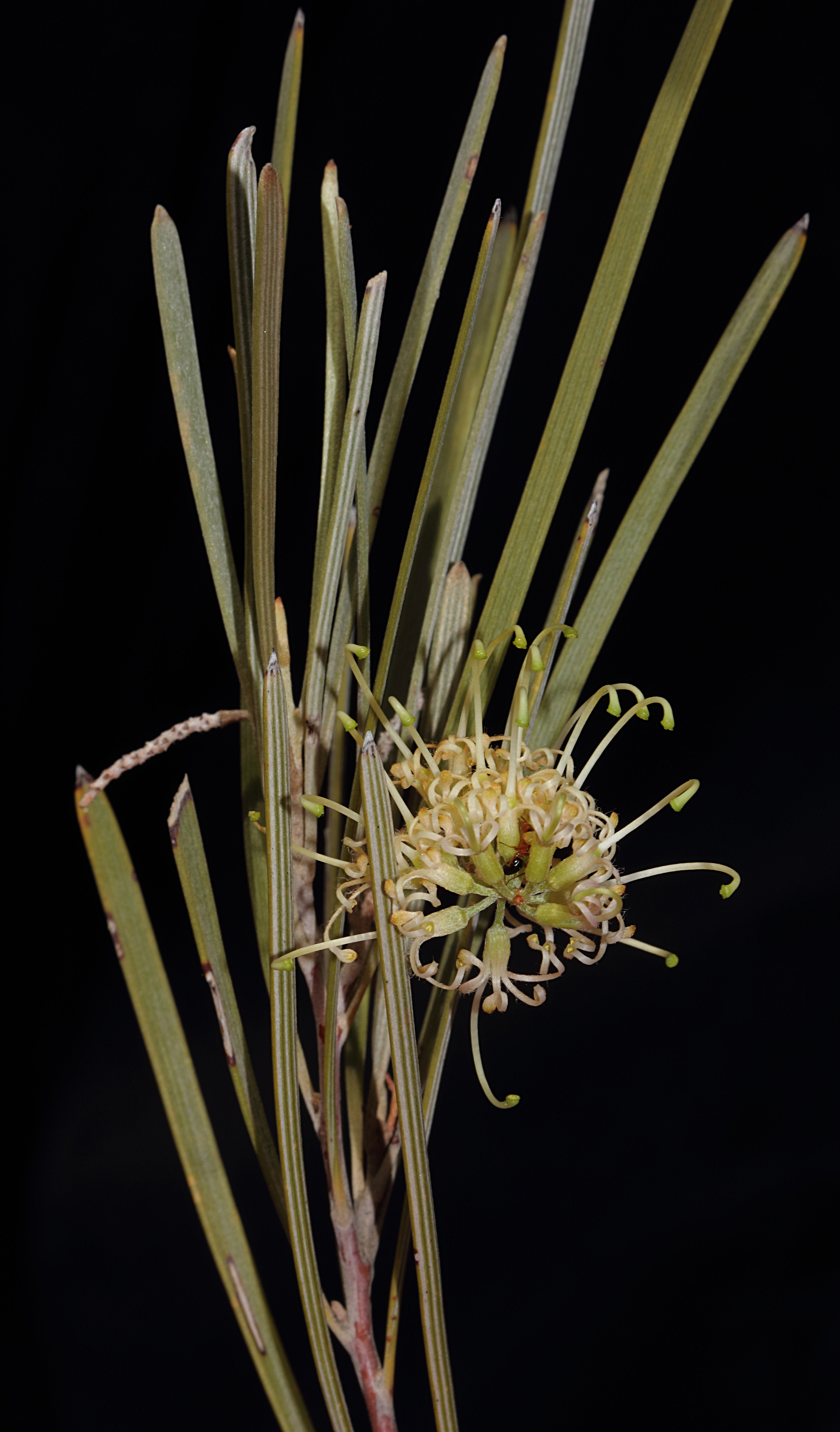

Conservation status
- Priority Three — Poorly Known Taxa (DEC)

Scientific classification
- Kingdom: Plantae
- Clade: Tracheophytes
- Clade: Angiosperms
- Clade: Eudicots
- Order: Proteales
- Family: Proteaceae
- Genus: Grevillea
- Species: G. subterlineata

Binomial name
- Grevillea subterlineata Makinson

= Grevillea subterlineata =

Species of shrub endemic to Western Australia

Grevillea subterlineata is a species of flowering plant in the family Proteaceae and is endemic to a restricted area in the southwest of Western Australia. It is an open shrub with linear leaves and clusters of pink-tinged, white flowers.

== Description ==
Grevillea subterlineata is an open shrub that typically grows to a height of 1.0–2.5 m (3 ft 3 in – 8 ft 2 in) and has silky-hairy branchlets. The leaves are linear, 60–130 mm (2.4–5.1 in) long,1.7–2.5 mm (0.067–0.098 in) wide and have the edges rolled under, with 3 longitudinal veins on the lower surface. The flowers are arranged in down-curved or pendulous, oval to cylindrical clusters on a woolly-hairy rachis 7–20 mm (0.28–0.79 in) long. The flowers are white with a pink tinge, the style with a green tip, and the pistil 14–17 mm (0.55–0.67 in) long. Flowering occurs in August.

== Taxonomy ==
Grevillea subterlineata was first formally described in 1993 by Robert Owen Makinson in Grevillea, Proteaceae: a taxonomic revision. The specific epithet (subterlineata) means "marked beneath by fine parallel lines".

== Distribution and habitat ==
This grevillea is only known from an area east of Gascoyne Junction in the Carnarvon, Gascoyne and Murchison bioregions of south-western Western Australia, where it grows in open shrubland and mulga woodland.

== Conservation status ==
Grevillea subterlineata is classified as "Priority Three" by the Government of Western Australia Department of Biodiversity, Conservation and Attractions, meaning that it is poorly known and known from only a few locations but is not under imminent threat.

== See also ==
- List of Grevillea species
