= Grevillea nematophylla =

Conservation status
- Least Concern (IUCN 3.1)

Scientific classification
- Kingdom: Plantae
- Clade: Tracheophytes
- Clade: Angiosperms
- Clade: Eudicots
- Order: Proteales
- Family: Proteaceae
- Genus: Grevillea
- Species: G. nematophylla

Binomial name
- Grevillea nematophylla F.Muell.

Species of shrub endemic to Australia

Grevillea nematophylla, commonly known as water bush or silver-leaved water bush, is a species of flowering plant in the family Proteaceae and is endemic to Australia. It is shrub or small tree with simple or pinnatisect leaves, the leaves or lobes linear, and branched, cylindrical clusters of cream-coloured flowers.

== Description ==
Grevillea nematophylla is a shrub or tree that typically grows to a height of 1–8 m (3 ft 3 in – 26 ft 3 in) and has rough bark on its main stem but smooth branchlets. Its leaves are linear, 40–300 mm (1.6–11.8 in) long, sometimes pinnatisect with 3 to 10 linear lobes, the leaves or lobes 0.5–1.5 mm (0.020–0.059 in) wide. The flowers are arranged in branched clusters, each cluster cylindrical and 60–140 mm (2.4–5.5 in) long, and are cream-coloured, the pistil 5–15 mm (0.20–0.59 in) long. Flowering occurs in November and December, and the fruit is a glabrous follicle 13–24 mm (0.51–0.94 in) long with a rough surface.

== Taxonomy ==
Grevillea nematophylla was first formally described in 1859 by Ferdinand von Mueller in Fragmenta Phytographiae Australiae from specimens collected by John Dallachy near the Murchison River. The specific epithet (nematophylla) means "thread-like leaved".

In 2000, Robert Owen Makinson described three subspecies of G. nematophylla in the Flora of Australia, and the names are accepted by the Australian Plant Census:

- Grevillea nematophylla Makinson subsp. nematophylla (the autonym) has flowers with the pistils 5–15 mm (0.20–0.59 in) long.
- Grevillea nematophylla subsp. planicostaMakinson differs from the autonym in having leaves and lobes that are T-shaped in cross-section, the flowers with the pistils 7–9 mm (0.28–0.35 in) long.
- Grevillea nematophylla C.A.Gardner subsp. supraplana has leaves that are three-quarters round in cross-section, the upper surface concave, and the pistils 5–5 mm (0.20–0.20 in) long.

== Distribution and habitat ==
Subspecies nematophylla grows along drainage lines and near soaks in the Avon Wheatbelt, Coolgardie, Great Victoria Desert, Murchison and Yalgoo bioregions of south-western Western Australia, in inland South Australia and southern parts of the Northern Territory. It was previously known from western New South Wales, but is now assumed to be extinct in that state.

Subspecies planicosta occurs in southern inland Western Australia from near Balladonia to the ranges north of Kalgoorlie and north-east of Laverton in the Coolgardie, Great Victoria Desert, Murchison, Nullarbor bioregions.

Subspecies supraplana is found from Meekatharra and Yalgoo to near Rawlinna in the Avon Wheatbelt, Great Victoria Desert, Murchison, Nullarbor and Yalgoo bioregions, and on the Nullarbor Plain in South Australia.

== Conservation status ==
All three subspecies of G. nematophylla are listed as not threatened, by the Western Australian Government Department of Biodiversity, Conservation and Attractions. The species is listed as extinct in New South Wales under the New South Wales Government Biodiversity Conservation Act 2016.
