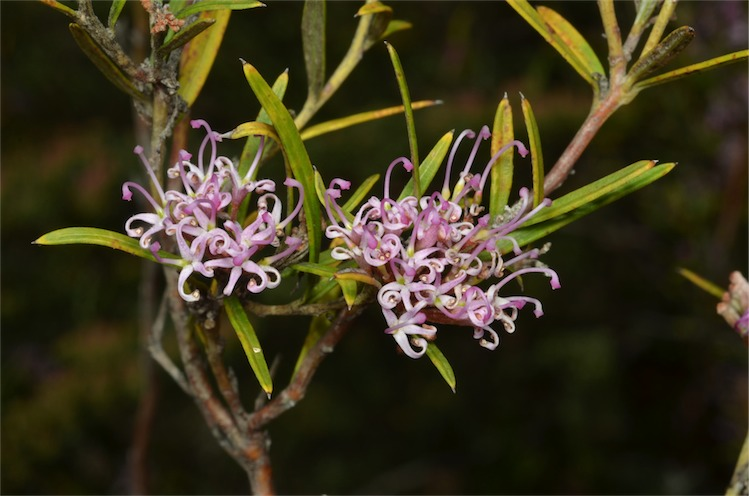
- In the Australian National Botanic Gardens

Conservation status
- Least Concern (IUCN 3.1)

Scientific classification
- Kingdom: Plantae
- Clade: Embryophytes
- Clade: Tracheophytes
- Clade: Angiosperms
- Clade: Eudicots
- Order: Proteales
- Family: Proteaceae
- Genus: Grevillea
- Species: G. patulifolia

Binomial name
- Grevillea patulifolia Gand.

= Grevillea patulifolia =

Species of shrub endemic to Australia

Grevillea patulifolia, commonly known as swamp grevillea, is a species of flowering plant in the family Proteaceae and is endemic to south-eastern continental Australia. It is an erect, or low spreading shrub with more or less linear to narrowly elliptic leaves, and large clusters of pale pink to dark mauve-pink flowers with a style that is hooked near its tip.

== Description ==
Grevillea patulifolia is an erect or low, spreading shrub that typically grows to a height of 0.2–2 m (7.9 in – 6 ft 6.7 in) and that sometimes forms root suckers. Its leaves are more or less linear to narrowly elliptic, 15–35 mm (0.59–1.38 in) long, 1.0–1.5 mm (0.039–0.059 in) wide and sharply pointed. The edges of the leaves are rolled under, often obscuring most of the lower surface. The flowers are arranged at the ends of branches in clusters of many flowers, the clusters usually shorter than the leaves. The flowers are pale pink to dark mauve-pink, the style sharply curved near the tip and the pistil 8.0–8.5 mm (0.31–0.33 in) long. Flowering occurs from July to February and the fruit is a narrowly elliptic follicle about 11 mm (0.43 in) long.

== Taxonomy ==
Grevillea patulifolia was first formally described in 1919 by Michel Gandoger in the Bulletin de la Société Botanique de France from specimens collected by Joseph Maiden.

== Distribution and habitat ==
Swamp grevillea grows in moist heath or woodland with a heathy understorey and is found on the coast and ranges south from Heathcote in New South Wales, in the Australian Capital Territory and in the extreme east of Victoria near Mallacoota.

== Conservation status ==
This grevillea is listed as "critically endangered" under the Victorian Government Flora and Fauna Guarantee Act 1988 and as "Rare in Victoria" on the Department of Sustainability and Environment's Advisory List of Rare Or Threatened Plants In Victoria.
