= Della Valle =

Della Valle may refer to:

== People ==
- Alessandro Della Valle, San Marinese footballer
- Andrea della Valle, 16th-century Italian cardinal
- Ángel Della Valle, Argentine painter
- Antonio della Valle, zoologist
- Dario Della Valle, Italian Olympic boxer;
- Diego Della Valle, Italian entrepreneur – brother of Andrea
- Edmondo Della Valle, Italian football player
- Filippo della Valle, 18th-century Italian sculptor
- Jay Della Valle, American film maker
- Nicola Della Valle, Italian singer
- Pietro Della Valle, Italian traveller of the 17th century in Asia

== Other ==
- Crosio della Valle, comune in Varese
- Prato della Valle, square in Padova
- San Dorligo della Valle, Italian comune in Trieste
- Sant'Andrea della Valle, church (basilica) in Rome

== See also ==
- Del Valle (disambiguation)
- Valle (disambiguation)
