= John Varley =

John Varley may refer to:

- John Varley (canal engineer) (1740–1809), English canal engineer
- John Varley (painter) (1778–1842), English painter and astrologer
- John Varley (author) (1947–2025), American science fiction author
- John Silvester Varley (born 1956), former CEO of Barclays Bank
- John Varley (photographer) (1934–2010), British photographer
