= Valletta (surname) =

Valletta is an Italian surname. Notable people with the surname include:

- Amber Valletta (born 1974), American actress and model
- Anthony Valletta (1908–1988), Maltese naturalist
- Antonino Valletta (1938–2022), Italian politician
- Vittorio Valletta (1883–1967), Italian industrialist
- Alexandra Valetta-Ardisson (born 1976), French politician

== See also ==
- Vallette
- Valletta (disambiguation)
