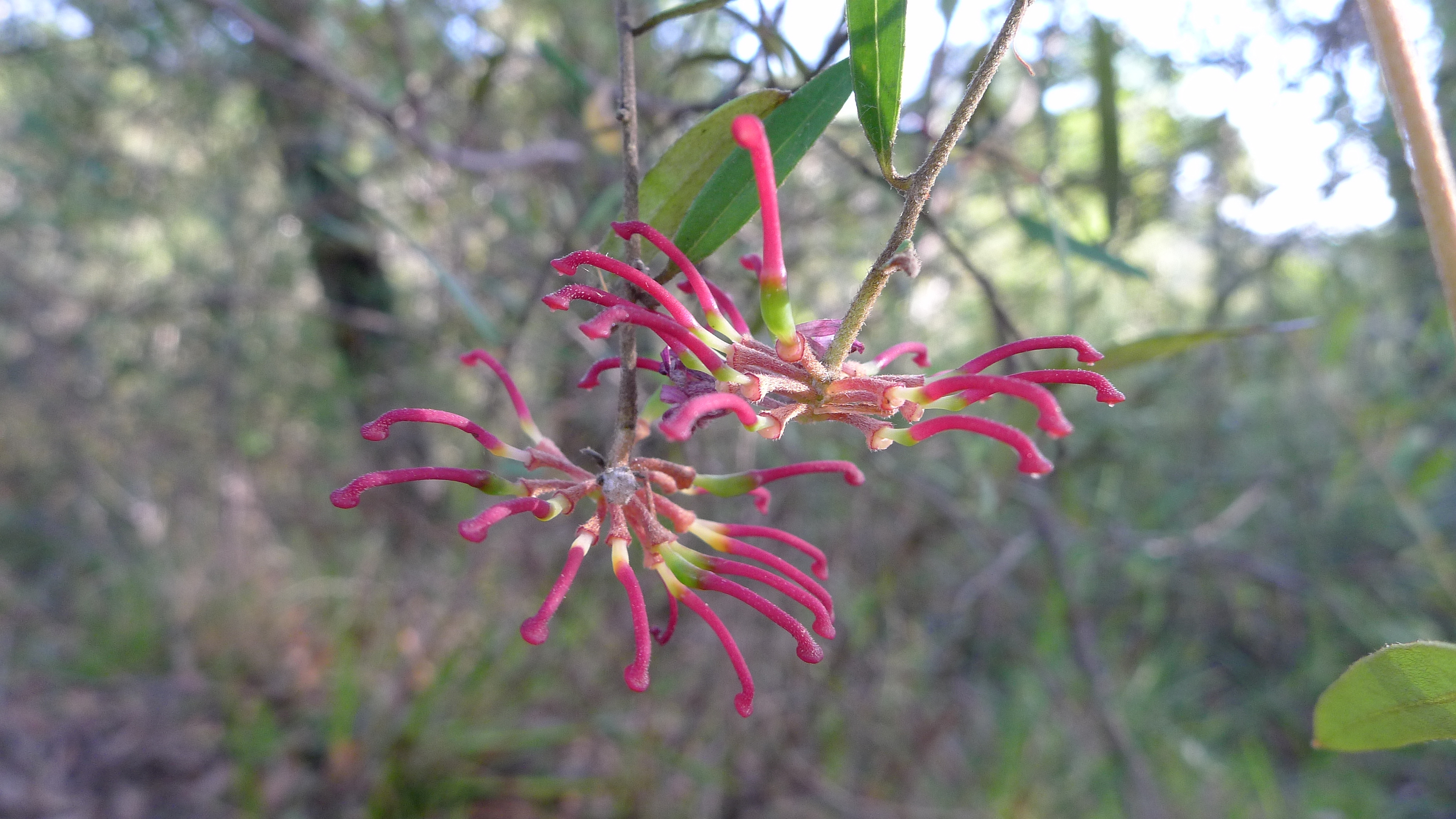
- In Heathcote National Park

Conservation status
- Least Concern (IUCN 3.1)

Scientific classification
- Kingdom: Plantae
- Clade: Embryophytes
- Clade: Tracheophytes
- Clade: Spermatophytes
- Clade: Angiosperms
- Clade: Eudicots
- Order: Proteales
- Family: Proteaceae
- Genus: Grevillea
- Species: G. diffusa

Binomial name
- Grevillea diffusa Sieber ex Spreng.

Synonyms
- Grevillea diffusa Sieber ex Schult. & Schult.f. nom. illeg., nom. superfl.; Grevillea sericea var. diffusa (Sieber ex Spreng.) Benth.

= Grevillea diffusa =

Species of plant endemic to Australia

Grevillea diffusa is a species of flowering plant in the family Proteaceae and is endemic to the Sydney region of New South Wales. It is a low, compact shrub with elliptic to linear leaves, and dark red, or dark crimson to scarlet and burgundy-coloured flowers.

== Description ==
Grevillea diffusa is compact shrub that typically grows to a height of up to 50 cm (20 in) but sometimes an erect shrub to 2 m (6 ft 7 in). The leaves are elliptic to lance-shaped with the narrower end towards the base, or linear, 20–130 mm (0.79–5.12 in) long and 1–10 mm (0.039–0.394 in) wide, the lower surface silky-hairy and the edges curved down or rolled under. The flowers are arranged in dome-shaped to more or less spherical groups and are dark red, dark crimson to burgundy-coloured or scarlet, depending on subspecies. The pistil is usually 6–11 mm (0.24–0.43 in) long and the style strongly curved and more or less glabrous. Flowering occurs from July to November and the fruit is a glabrous follicle.

== Taxonomy ==
Grevillea diffusa was first formally described in 1827 by Kurt Polycarp Joachim Sprengel in Systema Vegetabilium from an unpublished description by Sieber. The specific epithet (diffusa) means "spread out".

In 1986, Donald McGillivray described subspecies of G. diffusa in his book New Names in Grevillea (Proteaceae), and in 2000 Robert Owen Makinson described subspecies in Flora of Australia, and the following three names are accepted by the Australian Plant Census:

- Grevillea diffusa subsp. constablei Makinson has narrowly elliptic to more or less linear leaves mostly 60–70 mm (2.4–2.8 in) long and 2–4 mm (0.079–0.157 in) wide, peduncles less than 15 mm (0.59 in) long and dark crimson to dark burgundy-coloured flowers;
- Grevillea diffusa Sieber ex Spreng. subsp. diffusa has elliptic leaves 15–55 mm (0.59–2.17 in) long and 2–4 mm (0.079–0.157 in) wide, peduncles up to 10 mm (0.39 in) long and dark red flowers;
- Grevillea diffusa subsp. filipendula McGill. has narrowly elliptic to more or less linear leaves mostly 60–70 mm (2.4–2.8 in) long and 2–4 mm (0.079–0.157 in) wide, peduncles 15–40 mm (0.59–1.57 in) long and scarlet to light burgundy-coloured flowers.

== Distribution and habitat ==
This grevillea grows in forest or woodland, occasionally in swampy heath and is restricted to Hawkesbury sandstone in the Sydney basin. Subspecies constablei is found south of Sydney from Waterfall to Helensburgh and near the Georges River, subspecies diffusa from the lower Georges River to the Illawarra region and subspecies filipendula between Calga and Mount White, north of Sydney.

== Conservation status ==
Grevillea diffusa has been listed as least concern on the IUCN Red List of Threatened Species. Although its distribution is restricted, the population of this species is presumed to be stable and there are currently no major threats impacting it. Increased fire regimes may pose a minor threat in some areas of its distribution.
