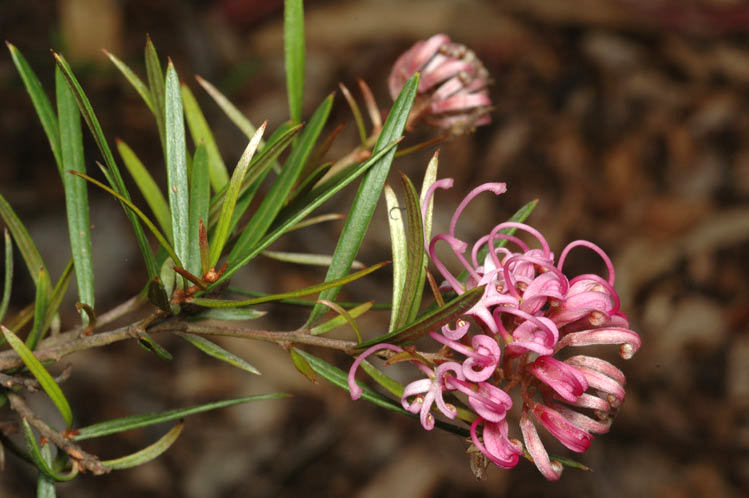
- Subspecies lucens in the Australian National Botanic Gardens

Conservation status
- Least Concern (IUCN 3.1)

Scientific classification
- Kingdom: Plantae
- Clade: Embryophytes
- Clade: Tracheophytes
- Clade: Angiosperms
- Clade: Eudicots
- Order: Proteales
- Family: Proteaceae
- Genus: Grevillea
- Species: G. humilis

Binomial name
- Grevillea humilis Makinson

Subspecies
- Grevillea humilis Makinson subsp. humilis; Grevillea humilis subsp. lucens Makinson; Grevillea humilis subsp. maritima Makinson

= Grevillea humilis =

Species of shrub endemic to Western Australia

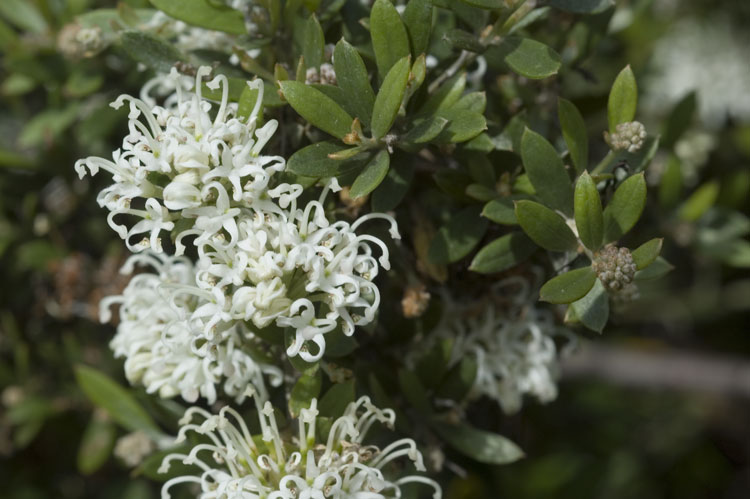
Subspecies maritima in the Coffs Harbour Botanic Garden

Grevillea humilis is a species of flowering plant in the family Proteaceae and is endemic to eastern New South Wales. It is an erect to spreading shrub with narrowly elliptic to more or less linear leaves, and pink or white flowers.

== Description ==
Grevillea humilis is an erect to spreading shrub, that typically grows to a height of 0.3–1.3 m (1 ft 0 in – 4 ft 3 in) and forms a rhizome. Its leaves are narrowly elliptic to more or less linear or lance-shaped to egg-shaped with the narrower end towards the base, 20–50 mm (0.79–1.97 in) long and 1.5–6 mm (0.059–0.236 in) wide, sometimes arranged in clusters of three. The flowers are arranged in loose clusters of 10 to 24 and are pink or white, the pistil usually 7–12 mm (0.28–0.47 in) long. Flowering time varies with subspecies and the fruit is a follicle 8–11 mm (0.31–0.43 in) long.

== Taxonomy ==
Grevillea humilis was first formally described in 2000 by Robert Owen Makinson in the Flora of Australia from specimens collected near the Bucketts Way in 1985. The specific epithet (humilis) means "low or small".

In the same publication, Makinson described three subspecies of G. humilis and the names are accepted by the Australian Plant Census:

- Grevillea humilis Makinson subsp. humilis has narrowly oblong leaves 1.8–2.5 mm (0.071–0.098 in) wide, the upper surface glabrous, each flower on a pedicel 4–6 mm (0.16–0.24 in) long, the flowers usually pink, sometimes white, flowering from August to November;
- Grevillea humilis subsp. lucens Makinson has narrowly oblong to almost linear leaves 1.7–3.5 mm (0.067–0.138 in) wide, the upper surface glabrous or silky-hairy, each flower on a pedicel 6–10 mm (0.24–0.39 in) long, the flowers pink, flowering from June to August;
- Grevillea humilis subsp. maritima Makinson has narrowly oblong to narrowly egg-shaped leaves with the narrower end towards the base, 2.5–6 mm (0.098–0.236 in) wide, the upper surface silky-hairy, each flower on a pedicel 5–9 mm (0.20–0.35 in) long, the flowers usually white, flowering from March to September.

== Distribution and habitat ==
Grevillea humilis occurs in the Glass House Mountains of South Eastern Queensland and south through the coast and nearby ranges of eastern New South Wales. Subspecies humilis grows in woodland in the Hunter region of New South Wales, inland as far as Scone. Subspecies lucens grows in open forest or woodland in the Glass House Mountains in Queensland and on the far New South Wales North Coast. Subspecies maritima grows in heath in rocky places in heath on the North Coast of New South Wales as far north as Bundjalung National Park.

== Conservation status ==
Grevillea humilis is listed as least concern on the IUCN Red List of Threatened Species. It is widely distributed and faces no major current threats overall, although it is believed to be in minor decline. Subspecies humilis is threatened by suburban expansion within parts of its range, though this does not affect the species as a whole to a degree that would warrant it a threatened or near-threatened category.
