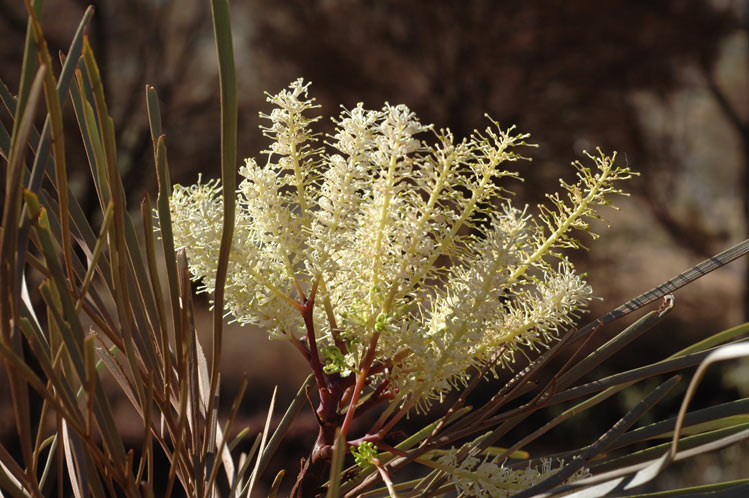
- Grevillea pyramidalis in Karijini National Park

Scientific classification
- Kingdom: Plantae
- Clade: Tracheophytes
- Clade: Angiosperms
- Clade: Eudicots
- Order: Proteales
- Family: Proteaceae
- Genus: Grevillea
- Species: G. pyramidalis

Binomial name
- Grevillea pyramidalis A.Cunn. ex R.Br.

= Grevillea pyramidalis =

Caustic bush

Species of shrub endemic to Western Australia

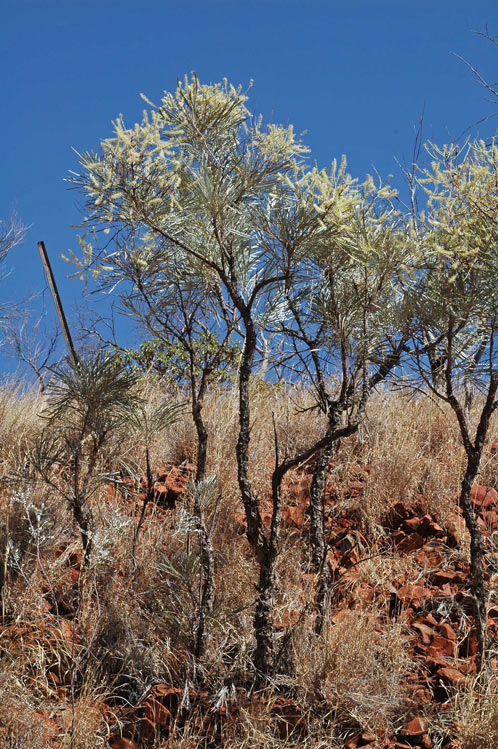
Habit near Tom Price

Grevillea pyramidalis, commonly known as the caustic bush, is a species of flowering plant in the family Proteaceae and is endemic to north-western Australia. It is an erect, spindly shrub or small tree with simple linear or pinnatisect leaves with linear to narrowly egg-shaped lobes, and white to yellow or cream-coloured flowers.

== Description ==
Grevillea pyramidalis is an erect, spindly shrub or tree that typically grows to a height of 2–6 m (6 ft 7 in – 19 ft 8 in) and has brownish branchlets. Its leaves are 150–420 mm (5.9–16.5 in) long simple, linear to narrowly egg-shaped with the narrower end towards the base, or pinnatisect. Pinnatisect leaves have 2 to 20 erect lobes shaped like the simple leaves, the end lobes are 50–290 mm (2.0–11.4 in) long and 1–21 mm (0.039–0.827 in) wide and flattened laterally. The flowers are usually arranged on the ends of branches in clusters with 3 to 11 branches, each branch 60–200 mm (2.4–7.9 in) long, the flowers white to yellow or cream-coloured, the pistil 5–8 mm (0.20–0.31 in) long. Flowering occurs from May to July and the fruit is a glabrous, sticky, flattened follicle 18–24 mm (0.71–0.94 in) long.

== Taxonomy ==
Grevillea pyramidalis was first formally described in 1830 by Robert Brown from an unpublished description by Allan Cunningham and the description was published in Supplementum primum prodromi florae Novae Hollandiae. The specific epithet (pyramidalis) means "pyramidal", referring to the shape of the flower clusters.

Three subspecies of G. pyramidalis have been described, and the names are accepted by the Australian Plant Census:

- Grevillea pyramidalis subsp. leucadendron (A.Cunn. ex R.Br.) Makinson has pinnatisect leaves 150–300 mm (5.9–11.8 in) long, usually with 7 to 20 lobes, the lower leaves often divided again, the lobes linear and 1–5 mm (0.039–0.197 in) wide.
- Grevillea pyramidalis subsp. longiloba (F.Muell.) Olde & Marriott (previously Grevillea longiloba F.Muell.) has leaves 300–420 mm (12–17 in) long and simple or divided with 2 or 3 erect lobes, the simple leaves or end lobes 2.5–5 mm (0.098–0.197 in) wide and strap-like.
- Grevillea pyramidalis (A.Cunn. ex R.Br.) Makinson subsp. pyramidalis has mostly pinnatisect leaves 150–320 mm (5.9–12.6 in) long, usually with 2 to 12 lobes, the lobes often divided again with 2 to 4 lobes, the end lobes linear and 7–21 mm (0.28–0.83 in) wide.

== Distribution and habitat ==
Caustic bush grows in a range of soil types. Subspecies leucadendron grows in open grassy woodland in the Carnarvon, Central Kimberley, Dampierland, Great Sandy Desert, Northern Kimberley, Ord Victoria Plain, Pilbara, Tanami and Victoria Bonaparte bioregions of northern Western Australia and the Northern Territory. Subspecies longiloba grows in open grassy woodland in the Northern Territory, mainly in the Katherine area and subsp. pyramidalis grows in low woodland between Broome and the Prince Regent River in north-western Western Australia.

== See also ==
- List of Grevillea species
