= Valletta (disambiguation) =

Valletta is the capital city of Malta.

Valletta may also refer to:

- Valletta F.C., a Maltese football club
- Valletta Waterfront, a wharf in Floriana, Malta
- Bank of Valletta, a Maltese bank
- Valletta Treaty, a Council of Europe treaty
- Valetta, New Zealand, a locality
- Valetta, Ontario, a community
- Valletta (surname), Italian surname
- Valetta (ship), several ships
- Valetta Iacopi (1904–1977), British operatic singer

== See also ==
- Vickers Valetta, an aeroplane
- Valetta Swann (1904–1973), English painter and sculptor
