= Vallée =

Vallée is a French surname. Notable people with the surname include:

- André Vallée (1930–2015), Canadian Roman Catholic bishop
- Anne Vallée (born 1958), Canadian biologist
- Bernard Vallée (1945–2021), French fencer
- Brigitte Vallée (born 1950), French mathematician and computer scientist
- Charles Vallée, French archer
- Claire Vallée (born 1980), French chef
- Jacques Vallée (born 1939), French astronomer and venture capitalist
- Jean Vallée (singer) (1941–2014), Belgian singer
- Jean-Marc Vallée (born 1963), Canadian film director and screenwriter
- Marcel Vallée (1880–1957), French actor
- Robert Vallée (1922–2017), French cyberneticist and mathematician
- Rudy Vallée (1901–1986), American singer and actor
- Stéphanie Vallée (born 1971), Canadian lawyer and politician
- Yvonne Vallée (1899–1996), French actress

== See also ==
- La Vallée (disambiguation)
- Valle (disambiguation)
- Vallé (disambiguation)
- Valee (disambiguation)
- Air Vallée, an Italian airline
- Valley (disambiguation)#People
- De la Vallée
