= Valetta (ship) =

Valetta may refer to:

- Recovery (1821 ship), a British opium ship renamed Valetta and wrecked in 1825
- SS Valetta, an early cruise ship built in 1889
- British polacca Valetta, a four 12-pounder carronades, 21-man ship captured by the Jean Bart in 1810.
