= El Valle de la Unión =

- Location within Panama
- Coordinates: 9°14′24″N 79°39′36″W
- Country: Panama
- Province: Colón

Population (2008)
  - Total: 990

El Valle de la Unión is a town in the Colón province of Panama.

== Sources ==
- World Gazeteer: Panama – World-Gazetteer.com
