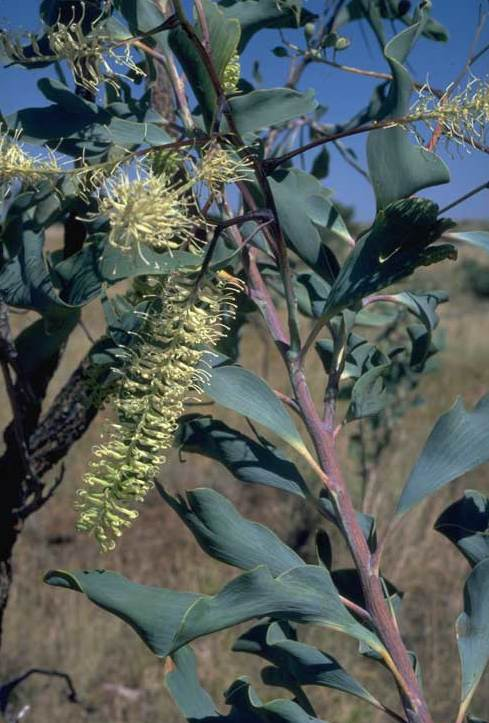
- At Wave Hill

Conservation status
- Least Concern (IUCN 3.1)

Scientific classification
- Kingdom: Plantae
- Clade: Embryophytes
- Clade: Tracheophytes
- Clade: Spermatophytes
- Clade: Angiosperms
- Clade: Eudicots
- Order: Proteales
- Family: Proteaceae
- Genus: Grevillea
- Species: G. dimidiata

Binomial name
- Grevillea dimidiata F.Muell.

= Grevillea dimidiata =

Species of shrub native to Australia

Grevillea dimidiata, also known as the caustic bush or willings tree, is a species of flowering plant in the family Proteaceae and is endemic to northern Australia. It is a shrub or small tree with glabrous, more or less sickle-shaped, curved leaves with wavy edges, and cylindrical groups of greenish-white to cream-coloured flowers.

== Description ==
Grevillea dimidiata is a single-stemmed, glabrous, often glaucous shrub or tree that typically grows to a height of 2–6 m (6 ft 7 in – 19 ft 8 in), sometimes to 12 m (39 ft). Its leaves are sickle-shaped and curved, 90–330 mm (3.5–13.0 in) long and 8–75 mm (0.31–2.95 in) wide, wrinkled and wavy. The leaves appear to have only one side, with the mid-vein on one edge of the leaves. The flowers are arranged on the ends of branchlets in three to eight cylindrical groups 40–110 mm (1.6–4.3 in) long. The flowers are greenish-white to cream-coloured and glabrous, the pistil 16.5–21 mm (0.65–0.83 in) long. Flowering mainly occurs from May to October and the fruit is a more or less spherical follicle 16–23 mm (0.63–0.91 in) long that is sticky at first.

== Taxonomy ==
Grevillea dimidiata was first formally described in 1863 by Ferdinand von Mueller in Fragmenta Phytographiae Australiae from specimens collected by Frederick George Waterhouse near the Roper River during John McDouall Stuart's sixth expedition. The specific epithet (dimidiata) means "divided in half", referring to the leaves.

== Distribution and habitat ==
This grevillea grows in open woodland, scrubland or grassland on rocky or sandy soils and on rocky outcrops and is found between Fitzroy Crossing, Mount Wittenoom and the Joseph Bonaparte Gulf in the Central Kimberley, Northern Kimberley, Ord Victoria Plain and Victoria Bonaparte biogeographic regions of northern Western Australia and north of Wave Hill and Gove in the northern part of the Northern Territory.

== Ecology ==
Caustic bush produces seeds after 4 or 5 years of age. The plant has a typical lifespan of 11 to 20 years and is well adapted to fires in its environment. Adult plants will undergo epicormic resprouting after a fire.

== Conservation status ==
Grevillea dimidiata is listed as least concern on the IUCN Red List of Threatened Species, not threatened by the Western Australian Government Department of Biodiversity, Conservation and Attractions and as of least concern under the Northern Territory Government Territory Parks and Wildlife Conservation Act 1976. The species has a widespread range where it is locally common. It has a stable population with no major threats affecting it.
