= Del Valle =

Del Valle may refer to:

- Del Valle (surname)

== Places ==
- Del Valle, Mexico City, Mexico

=== United States ===
- Del Valle, California
- Del Valle, Texas
  - Del Valle Independent School District
- Del Valle Regional Park, California
  - Lake Del Valle, a storage reservoir

== See also ==
- Del Valle High School (disambiguation)
- El Valle (disambiguation)
- Della Valle (disambiguation)
- Del (disambiguation)
- Del Val, a surname
