= Vallette =

Vallette is a French surname. Notable people with the surname include:

- Alfred Vallette (1858–1935), French man of letters
- Marguerite Vallette-Eymery (1860–1953), French novelist and playwright
- Bruno Vallette (born 1976), French mathematician
- Henri Vallette (1877–1962), Swiss sculptor
- Jean Vallette d'Osia (1898–2000), French general best known for his action in the French Resistance
- Maurice Vallette (1851–1880), French graveur
- Michel Vallette d'Osia (1926–2009), French officer
- Paul Vallette (1872–1953), French professor
- Pierre Vallette (fl. 1552–1561)
- Pierre Vallette-Viallard (1883–1968), French politician
- René Vallette (1874–1956), French painter
- Thibaut Vallette (born 1974), French equestrian
- Yves Vallette (1920–2014), French explor

== See also ==
- Valletta (surname)
- La Vallette
