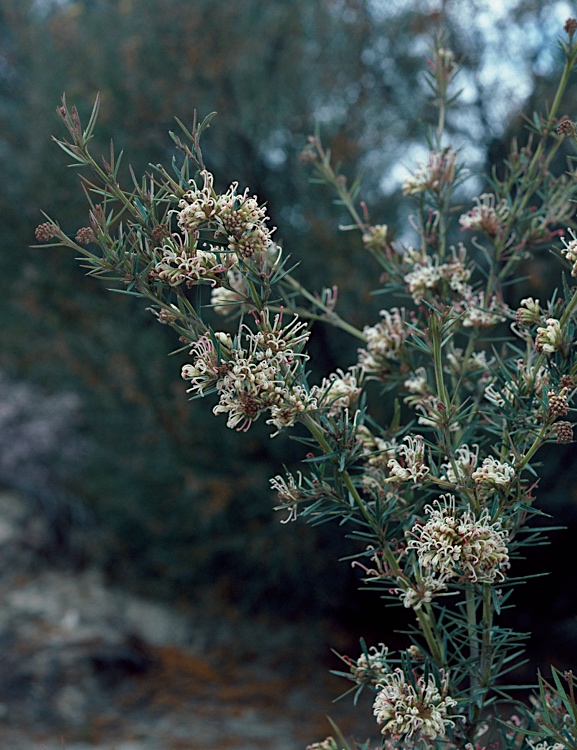
- In Budawang National Park

Conservation status
- Vulnerable (IUCN 3.1)

Scientific classification
- Kingdom: Plantae
- Clade: Tracheophytes
- Clade: Angiosperms
- Clade: Eudicots
- Order: Proteales
- Family: Proteaceae
- Genus: Grevillea
- Species: G. parviflora

Binomial name
- Grevillea parviflora R.Br.

= Grevillea parviflora =

Species of shrub endemic to New South Wales, Australia

Grevillea parviflora, commonly known as small-flower grevillea, is a species of flowering plant in the family Proteaceae and is endemic to the Sydney region of eastern New South Wales. It is a low, dense, spreading to erect shrub with more or less linear leaves and white flowers with a red style that sometimes turns red as it ages.

== Description ==
Grevillea parviflora is a dense, spreading to erect shrub that typically grows to a height of 1 m (3 ft 3 in) or less and sometimes forms a rhizome. Its leaves are more or less linear, mostly 15–35 mm (0.59–1.38 in) long and 0.8–1 mm (0.031–0.039 in) wide with the edges turned down or rolled, the lower surface silky hairy when visible. The flowers are arranged in groups of 4 to 14 on the ends of branches, the groups usually shorter than the nearby leaves. The flowers are white with rust-coloured hairs, the style sometimes turning red with age, the pistil usually 4.5–6.5 mm (0.18–0.26 in) long. Flowering occurs from July to December and the fruit is a glabrous, warty follicle 8–10 mm (0.31–0.39 in) long.

== Taxonomy ==
Grevillea parviflora was first formally described in 1810 by Robert Brown in Transactions of the Linnean Society of London. The specific epithet (parviflora) means "small-flowered".

In 2000, Robert Owen Makinson described two subspecies of G. parviflora in the Flora of Australia, and the names are accepted by the Australian Plant Census:

- Grevillea parviflora subsp. parviflora Makinson has more or less erect main branches, leaves mostly 0.8–1.3 mm (0.031–0.051 in) wide and the "stalk" of the ovary 1.0–1.2 mm (0.039–0.047 in) long.
- Grevillea parviflora R.Br. subsp. supplicans has more or less spreading main branches, leaves mostly 0.6–2 mm (0.024–0.079 in) wide and the "stalk" of the ovary 0.5–0.6 mm (0.020–0.024 in) long.

== Distribution and habitat ==
This grevillea grows heath or shrubby or heathy woodland in the Sydney region. Subspecies parviflora is mostly found west and south of Sydney between Camden, Appin and Cordeaux Dam with disjunct populations near Putty, Cessnock and Cooranbong. Subspecies supplicans occurs north-west of Sydney near Arcadia, Maroota and Marramarra National Park.

== Conservation status ==
This species is listed as vulnerable on the IUCN Red List of Threatened Species. The subspecies parviflora is listed as vulnerable under the Australian Government Environment Protection and Biodiversity Conservation Act 1999 and the New South Wales Government Biodiversity Conservation Act 2016. Subspecies supplicans is listed as endangered under the Biodiversity Conservation Act 2016.

The type subspecies, subsp. parviflora has a fairly large population and a wide distribution, whereas subsp. supplicans is believed to consist of fewer than 1,000 mature individuals and is highly restricted to a distribution of 8 by 10 km^{2} (5.0 by 6.2 mi^{2}). The overall population of the species is declining and is severely fragmented. The primary threat to the species is habitat loss and fragmentation through urban and agricultural development, road maintenance and mining activities. Too frequent fire regimes prevent the species from developing a sufficient soil seed bank for post-fire seedling recruitment. It is also threatened by competition with invasive weeds such as African lovegrass (Eragrostis curvula) and other perennial grasses and herbaceous weeds, illegal rubbish dumping and possible susceptibility to phytophthora dieback disease.
