= Vallen =

Vallen is a surname. Notable people with the surname include:

- Mark Vallen (born 1953), American activist, artist, and blogger
- Ricky Vallen (born 1978), Brazilian singer
- Via Vallen

== Cinema ==
- Vallen (film), a 2001 film

== See also ==
- Vallen Castle, castle in Sweden
