= Vallé =

Vallé is a surname. Notable people with the surname include:

- Paul Vallé (1926–2004), British sprinter
- Ernest Vallé (1845–1920), French lawyer and politician
- François Vallé (1716–1783), French Canadian who became the richest man in Upper Louisiana

== See also ==
- Valle (disambiguation)
- Vallée (disambiguation)
