= John Varley (photographer) =

British photographer (1934–2010)

- Born: 21 August 1934; Doncaster, West Riding of Yorkshire, England
- Died: 4 September 2010 (aged 76)
- Occupation: Photographer
- Notable work: Photograph of Pelé and Bobby Moore
- Website: VarleyMedia.com

John Albert Varley (21 August 1934 - 4 September 2010) was a British photographer, who spent the majority of his career working for The Daily Mirror. He famously took coloured photos at the 1966 FIFA World Cup final, which at the time was seen as a novelty. Varley also took photos of war zones, including Nigeria and Northern Ireland.

Varley was a football fan, who every four years took a sabbatical from work to attend World Cups. He attended the 1970 FIFA World Cup, where he took one of the most iconic sports photos of all time. The photo was of Pelé and Bobby Moore embracing after Brazil had beaten England. In 1979, he won a World Press Photo Award for the photo of the acclaimed sculptor, Henry Moore.

Varley was a Leeds United fan and took numerous photos which are still used by the club today. His personal works of Leeds United games during the Don Revie era have featured in numerous sports books.

== Early life and education ==
Varley was born in 1934 in Doncaster, West Riding of Yorkshire, England. After leaving school at 14, Varley worked for a local newspaper, the Yorkshire Evening News.

Varley was inspired to become a photographer at a young age when a neighbour took a photo of him with his dog. The neighbour went away and developed the photo before presenting it to Varley the next day.

== Career ==
Varley worked in photography from 1948 onwards. He spent the early years of his career working in Yorkshire, covering many local incidents. In 1958, he achieved his first career milestone when one of his photos featured on the front page of numerous national newspapers. The photo was a policeman carrying a small child through flood water during flooding in South Yorkshire during 1958.

The popularity of the photo enhanced Varley's reputation as a photographer. He soon landed a role at The Daily Mirror, where he became the northern correspondent for the tabloid. The role was based in Leeds, where he remained for his entire career, despite numerous offers to relocate to London and run the Daily Mirror's Picture Desk. Varley spent much of his time at The Daily Mirror photographing war zones and natural disasters. In a New York Times article, his peers commented that Varley had "what other photographers described as an instinct for being where things might develop, and a patience to wait for the crucial moment."

Varley spent time in Northern Ireland during the Northern Ireland civil rights movement in the 1960s and 1970s, famously taking the photo of a church's cross surrounded by barbed wire. He also was one of the first British photographers on the ground in Nigeria during the Biafra civil war. He took photos of children during the conflict, which were commonly used in Britain when referring to the conflict. He also attended The Beatles concerts, where he took professional photographs.

From 1966 onwards, Varley covered every FIFA World Cup until 1982. He agreed with The Daily Mirror that he would take a sabbatical from work every four years in order to do so. Only a handful of photographers took colour photos of the 1966 FIFA World Cup Final between England and West Germany and Varley was one of them. He famously took photos from the stands during the first half, before approaching a messenger during halftime and asking if he could use his credentials. He then approached a steward and in broken German, explained that he had gone to the toilet and lost his pass. The steward allowed Varley onto the side of the pitch, where he took numerous memorable photos of England winning their first World Cup.

Varley attended the next FIFA World Cup in 1970, where he took one of the most famous sports photos of Pelé and Bobby Moore embracing following the match. He also covered two Muhammad Ali fights against Henry Cooper and Richard Dunn. From the 1980s onwards he also attended a number of music concerts, photographing The Rolling Stones, Madonna and Michael Jackson.

In 1979, Varley was the winner of World Press Photo Award in the Science & Technology category, for a shot of the acclaimed sculptor, Henry Moore. The photo was taken during Moore's 80th birthday exhibition in Bradford, England.

Varley covered numerous royal events during his career, including the Investiture of the Prince of Wales, the launch of the QEII cruise liner, and the wedding of Andrew, Duke of York, to Sarah Ferguson in 1986. He retired a couple of years later, taking voluntary redundancy from the Daily Mirror and agreeing a deal to take ownership of all his photographs.

== Pelé and Bobby Moore photo ==
Varley is best known for taking the iconic sports photo of Brazilian legend Pelé and England captain Bobby Moore. The photo was taken on the pitch straight after the final whistle in the 1970 FIFA World Cup game between Brazil and England.

The photo of the two men is seen as iconic. In a recent BBC documentary, Pelé commented "that photo has gone around the world. I think it was very important for football." He continued, "we demonstrate that it's a sport. Win or lose, the example, the friendship, you must pass these on to other players to the next generation."

== Recognition ==
- World Press Photo Award (1979)

== Personal life ==
Varley married June Cracknell and they had two children, Andrew Varley and David Varley, born in 1960 and 1966 respectively. Both of Varley's sons have since followed in his footsteps and began to work in the media. Andrew is a photographer who runs Varley Picture Agency, while David is a filmmaker who runs his own production company, OnFilm.biz. Varley's grandson James worked for Leeds United, before moving to Qatar to work for the 2022 FIFA World Cup organising committee. Andrew Varley's son Jack Varley has worked alongside his father as Leeds United photographer since 2001.

Varley was known as a Leeds United fan and covered many of their major finals and league successes during the 1960s and 1970s. This included four FA Cup Finals, in 1965, 1970, 1972 and 1973. Many of the photos taken by Varley at Leeds are still used to this day. He contributed his photos to a number of picture books about Leeds United, including the popular ‘Welcome to Elland Road’ in 1999.

== Legacy ==
In 1994, an exhibition of his work took place in his hometown of Doncaster. The exhibition led to his work being featured in numerous publications.

In 2016, Varley's grandson James began work on a website dedicated to Varley's work: www.varleymedia.com. The website was launched in March 2017 and features the John Varley Signature Collection: https://www.varleymedia.com/signature-collection.
