= Vallely =

- Pronunciation: /ˈvæləli/

Origin
- Region of origin: Ireland

Other names
- Variant forms: Vaillily, Mac Giolla Mhuire, Mac Giolla Mhura or Mac Giolla Bhearshúiligh

Vallely /ˈvæləli/ is a surname of Irish origin, possibly deriving from Irish Mac Giolla Mhuire, Mac Giolla Mhura or Mac Giolla Bhearshúiligh. Bearers include:

- Bill Vallely, US illustrator
- Cillian Vallely, Irish traditional musician
- Jim Vallely, US TV producer and screenwriter
- John Vallely, US former basketball player
- Mike Vallely, US skateboarder
- Niall Vallely, Irish traditional musician
- Paul Vallely, UK author, journalist, and writer on philanthropy, religion, ethics and development issues
- Paul E. Vallely, US soldier and military consultant for Fox News
- Simon Vallily, British boxer
