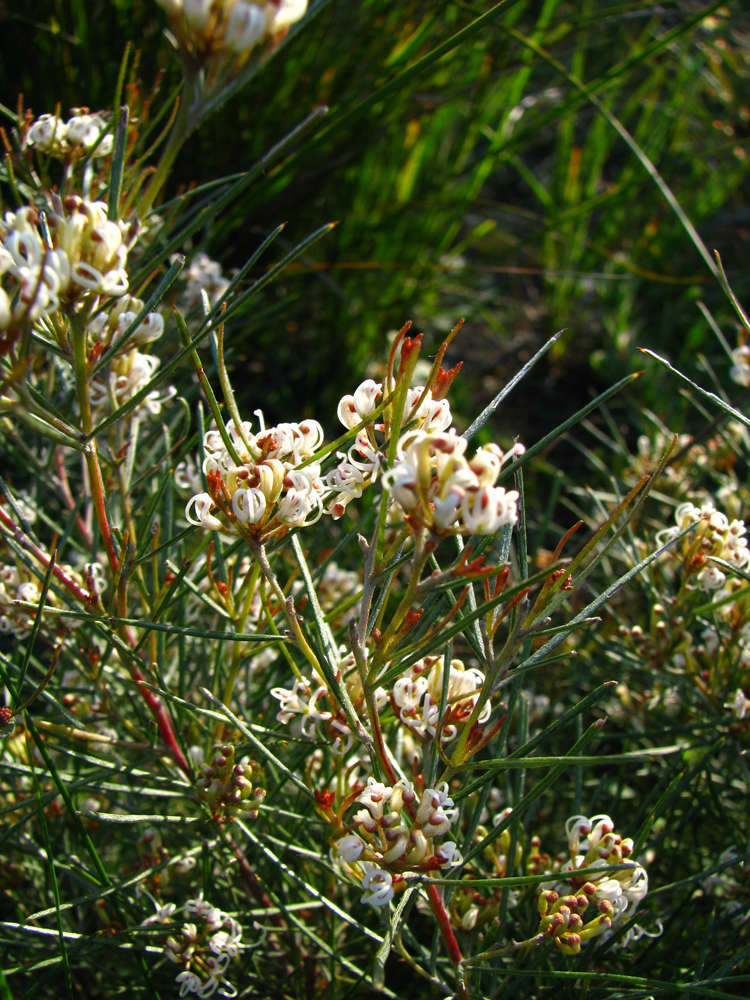
- In the Brisbane Ranges

Scientific classification
- Kingdom: Plantae
- Clade: Tracheophytes
- Clade: Angiosperms
- Clade: Eudicots
- Order: Proteales
- Family: Proteaceae
- Genus: Grevillea
- Species: G. micrantha

Binomial name
- Grevillea micrantha Meisn.

= Grevillea micrantha =

Species of shrub endemic to Victoria, Australia

Grevillea micrantha, also known as small-flower grevillea, is a species of flowering plant in the family Proteaceae and is endemic to Victoria in Australia. It is a spreading shrub with linear leaves and clusters of white to pale pink flowers.

== Description ==
Grevillea micrantha is a spreading shrub that typically grows to a height of 30–60 cm (12–24 in) and often forms root suckers. The leaves are linear to narrowly elliptic, 10–40 mm (0.39–1.57 in) long and 0.6–1 mm (0.024–0.039 in) wide with the edges rolled under, usually obscuring the lower surface. The flowers are usually arranged on the ends of branches in umbel-like clusters of about 6 to 14 about 10 mm (0.39 in) long. The flowers are white to pale pink, the pistil 5.0–6.5 mm (0.20–0.26 in) long. Flowering occurs from August to January and the fruit is an oval follicle 10–11 mm (0.39–0.43 in) long.

== Taxonomy ==
Grevillea micrantha was first formally described in 1854 by Carl Meissner in Linnaea: ein Journal für die Botanik in ihrem ganzen Umfange, oder Beiträge zur Pflanzenkunde. The specific epithet (micrantha) means "small-flowered".

== Distribution and habitat ==
Small-flower grevillea grows in poor, stony soils in woodland in south-western Victoria in scattered populations in the area between the Brisbane Ranges, Wedderburn and Portland.

== Conservation status ==
This grevillea is listed as critically endangered in Victoria under the Flora and Fauna Guarantee Act 1988 and as rare in Victoria on the Department of Sustainability and Environment's Advisory List of Rare Or Threatened Plants In Victoria.
