= Michel Gandoger =

French botanist and mycologist (1850–1926)

Abbé Jean Michel Gandoger (10 May 1850 – 4 October 1926), was a French botanist and mycologist. He was born in Arnas, the son of a wealthy vineyard owner in the Beaujolais region. Although he took holy orders at the age of 26, he devoted his life to the study of botany, specializing in the genus Rosa. He travelled throughout the Mediterranean, notably Crete, Spain, Portugal, and Algeria, amassing a herbarium of over 800,000 specimens, now kept at the Jardin botanique de Lyon. Gandoger issued and distributed several exsiccata-like series, among others Herbarium Generale. Rosarum Europaearum Exsiccatarum and Flora Algeriensis exsiccata. However, he is notorious for having published thousands of plant species that are no longer accepted. He died at Arnas in 1926.

Father J B Charbonnel published an obituary in the Bulletin de la Societe botanique de France (1927, Vol. 74, 3–11), listing Gandoger's many publications. Plants with the specific epithet of gandogeri are named after him, an example being Carex gandogeri.

== Publications ==
- Flore lyonnaise et des départements du sud-est, comprenant l'analyse des plantes spontanées et des plantes cultivées comme industrielles ou ornementales (1875)
- Revue du genre Polygonum (1882)
- Flora europaea (1883-1891, 27 volumes)
- Herborisations dans les Pyrénées (1884)
- Monographie mondiale des Crucifères (3 volumes)
