= Robert Owen Makinson =

Australian botanist

Robert Owen Makinson (born 1956) is an Australian botanist. He has published some 65 botanical names. See also Taxa named by Robert Owen Makinson. He studied at Macquarie University, was ABLO at Kew in 1995–1996 (replacing Barry Conn). From 1993 to 2001, he was a curator at the Australian National Herbarium. From 2001 to 2016 he was conservation botanist for the Botanic Garden Trust, and in 2017 he was principal investigator for the Myrtle Rust project run by Plant Biosecurity Cooperative Research Centre.

== Some publications ==
- McGillivray, D.J., & Makinson, R.O. (1993). Grevillea, Proteaceae: a taxonomic revision. Melbourne University Press.
- Gallagher, R.V., Makinson, R.O., Hogbin, P.M., & Hancock, N. (2015). "Assisted colonization as a climate change adaptation tool". Austral Ecology. 40 (1): 12–20. doi:10.1111/aec.12163.
- Mast, A.R., Olde, P.M., Makinson, R.O., Jones, E., Kubes, A., Miller, E T., & Weston, P.H. (2015). "Paraphyly changes understanding of timing and tempo of diversification in subtribe Hakeinae (Proteaceae), a giant Australian plant radiation". American Journal of Botany. 102 (10): 1634–1646. doi:10.3732/ajb.1500195. PMID 26451040.
- Commander, L.E., Coates, D.J., Broadhurst, L., Offord, C.A., Makinson, R.O., & Matthes, M. (2018). Guidelines for the translocation of threatened plants in Australia. Australian Network for Plant Conservation Incorporated.
