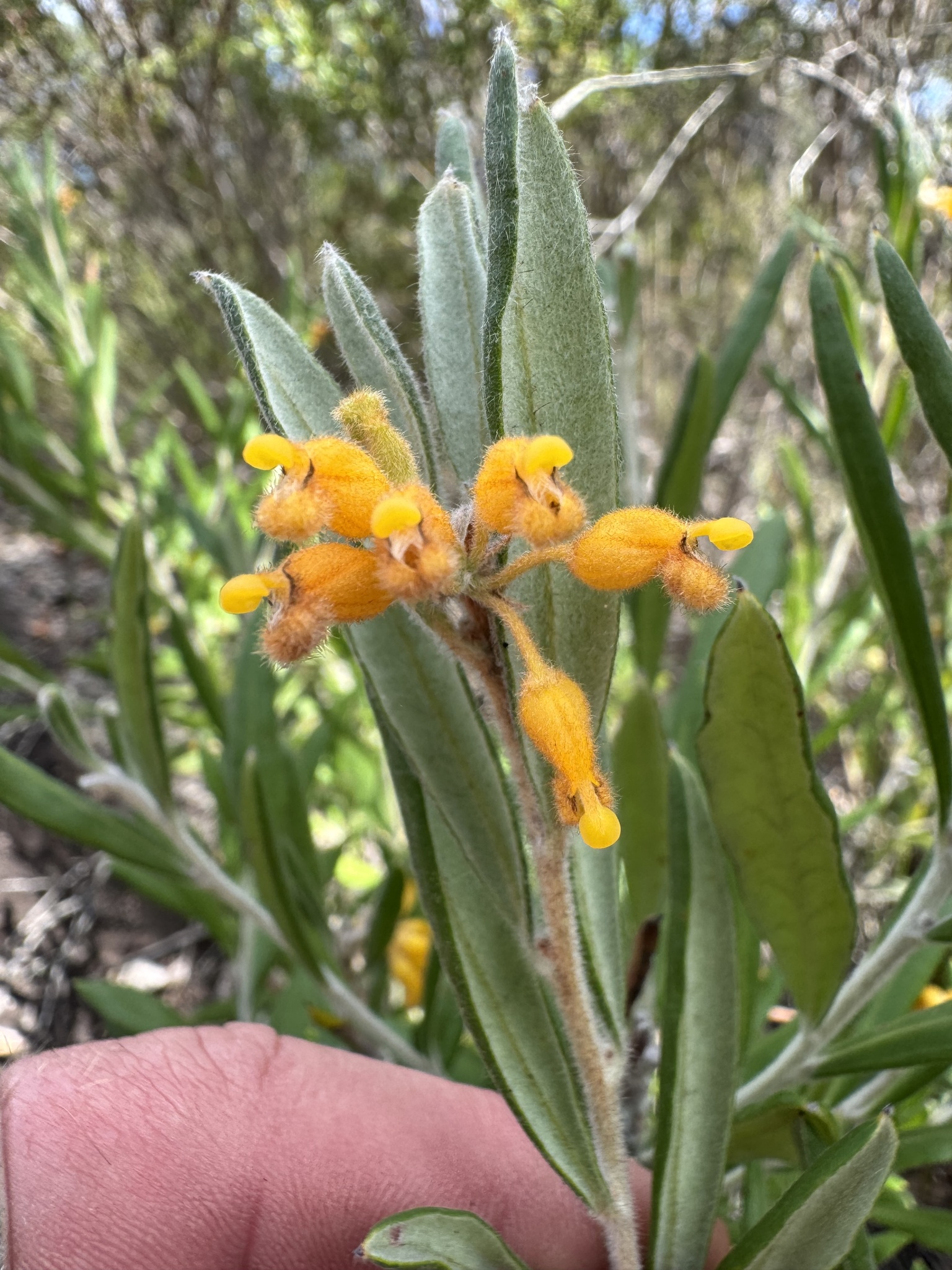

Conservation status
- Critically Endangered (IUCN 3.1)

Scientific classification
- Kingdom: Plantae
- Clade: Embryophytes
- Clade: Tracheophytes
- Clade: Spermatophytes
- Clade: Angiosperms
- Clade: Eudicots
- Order: Proteales
- Family: Proteaceae
- Genus: Grevillea
- Species: G. fuscolutea

Binomial name
- Grevillea fuscolutea Keighery

= Grevillea fuscolutea =

Species of shrub endemic to Western Australia

Grevillea fuscolutea is a species of flowering plant in the family Proteaceae and is endemic to a small area in the south-west of Western Australia. It is an erect shrub with egg-shaped to more or less linear leaves, and dull yellow-orange flowers.

== Description ==
Grevillea fuscolutea is an erect shrub that typically grows to a height of 0.5–2.5 m (1 ft 8 in – 8 ft 2 in), its new growth covered with rust-coloured hairs. The leaves are egg-shaped with the narrower end towards the base, to more or less linear, 15–80 mm (0.59–3.15 in) long and 5–12 mm (0.20–0.47 in) wide. The edges of the leaves are turned down or rolled under, the lower surface densely covered with shaggy hairs, and there is a small black point on the tip. The flowers are borne in groups of four to ten on a rachis 1–3 mm (0.039–0.118 in) long and are dull yellow-orange, the pistil 6–8 mm (0.24–0.31 in) long. Flowering occurs from April to November and the fruit is a ribbed, narrowly oval follicle about 17 mm (0.67 in) long. Regeneration is from seed. The species is closely related to Grevillea fistulosa but differs in having a ring of hair in the perianth, and yellow instead of red flowers.

== Taxonomy ==
Grevillea fuscolutea was first collected by William Webb in 1879 and then again 100 years later by a Forestry Department survey group. It was collected from the same locale several times over the following years. Long recognised as being part of the Grevillea drummondii complex, it was first formally described in 1992 by Gregory John Keighery in the journal Nuytsia from material he collected in 1989. The specific epithet (fuscolutea) means "brownish yellow".

== Distribution and habit ==
Grevillea fuscolutea is found amongst low trees in rocky or stoney soils as well as on sand and loam over granite. It is restricted to upper slopes of Mount Lindesay, to the north east of Denmark in the heathland and around granite outcrops.

== Conservation status ==
This species is listed as critically endangered on the IUCN Red List of Threatened Species. It is only known from one location where it has an estimated area of occupancy of less than 10 km^{2} (3.9 sq mi). It is currently threatened by increased fire regimes and drought due to climate change, as well as dieback disease from the plant pathogen Phytophtora cinnamoni, which it is susceptible to. It is predicted that it could lose at least 80% of its population within the next 75 years or 3 generational lengths for the species due to the effects of dieback disease.

It is also classified as vulnerable by the Western Australian Government Department of Biodiversity, Conservation and Attractions.

== See also ==
- List of Grevillea species
