= Fossil record of fire =

Fossilized evidence of wildfires on Earth

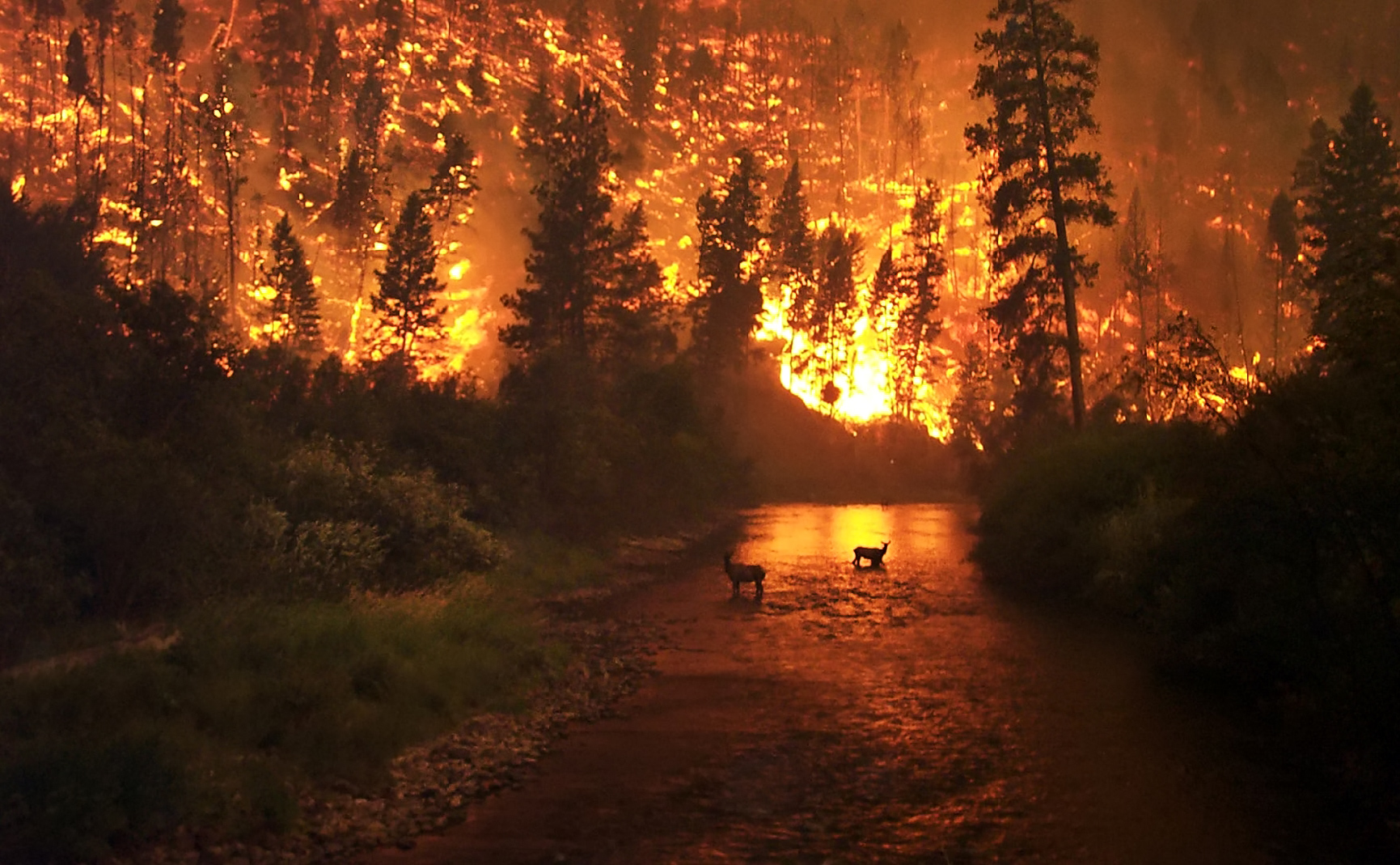
A modern-day wildfire

The fossil record of fire first appears about 430 million years ago during the Silurian period, with the discovery of charcoal in Silurian layers of Wales and Poland. This is considered proof that fires happened to the then-existing macroscopic land plants.

To occur, fire needs oxygen in the air. In the oceans of the Proterozoic eon, the rise of eukaryotic photoautotrophs (green and red algae) for hundreds of millions of years injected further oxygen into the air and, much later, the appearance of macroscopic land plants (embryophytes) led to increased levels of oxygen in the atmosphere as the new hordes of land plants pumped it out as a waste product. When this concentration rose above 13%, it led to the possibility of wildfire. Wildfires were first recorded in the late Silurian fossil record, 430 million years ago, evidenced by fossils of charcoalified plants found in the 2020s. Before these finds, evidence of wildfires dated 420 million years ago had been found in the early 2000s. Apart from a controversial gap in the Late Devonian, charcoal has been present in the fossil record ever since. The level of atmospheric oxygen is closely related to the prevalence of charcoal, as oxygen is the key factor in the abundance of wildfire. Fire also became more abundant when grasses became the dominant component of many ecosystems around 6 to 7 million years ago. This kindling provided tinder, which allowed for the rapid spread of fire. These widespread fires may have initiated a positive feedback process, whereby they produced a warmer, drier climate more conducive to fire.

== Fossil evidence ==
The fossil evidence of paleo-wildfire comes mainly from charcoal, the earliest evidence of which dates to the Silurian period. Charcoal results from organic matter being exposed to high temperatures, which extracts volatile elements from the matter, resulting in refractory black carbon. Charcoal differs from coal, which is a combination of fossilized plants and inertinite, or fossilized charcoal. Inertinite can be burned to yield heat but, unlike the non-charcoal components of coal, does not yield significant volatile fractions during coking. Coking is the refractory process which separates coal gas from coal to make coke. The loss of volatile elements during combustion means that charred remnants are shrunk in volume. The refractory nature of the charcoal enhances preservation potential.

The main inertinite sub-macerals are fusinite, semifusinite, micrinite, macrinite, and funginite, with semifusinite being the most common. Compositional percentages of fusinite and semifusinite indicate paleo-wildfire magnitude, frequency, and type. Charred plants in fusinite and semifusinite can be preserved in detail, with original cell structures preserved in three dimensions. Images can be recovered using scanning electron microscopy. Fragments can be distributed some distance by both wind and water. Black carbon-rich alluvial deposits in river deltas can provide a 'time-averaged' record of fire activity in the river's catchment and up-wind area.

Fossilized trees that survived fires can also provide evidence of fire frequency, especially when scorch marking can be linked to the annual growth rings of the affected tree. These are more useful for relatively recent eras, although there is a report of this phenomenon in pre-Tertiary strata, such as fossilized Triassic trees found in the Antarctic.

Evidence of lightning strikes is usually difficult to link to specific fires, although they may occasionally scorch trees, as the evidence of the lightning is often destroyed in the fire. Fulgurites - fused sediments where a strike has melted together the soil - are occasionally preserved in the geological record from the Permian onwards.

== Charcoal ==
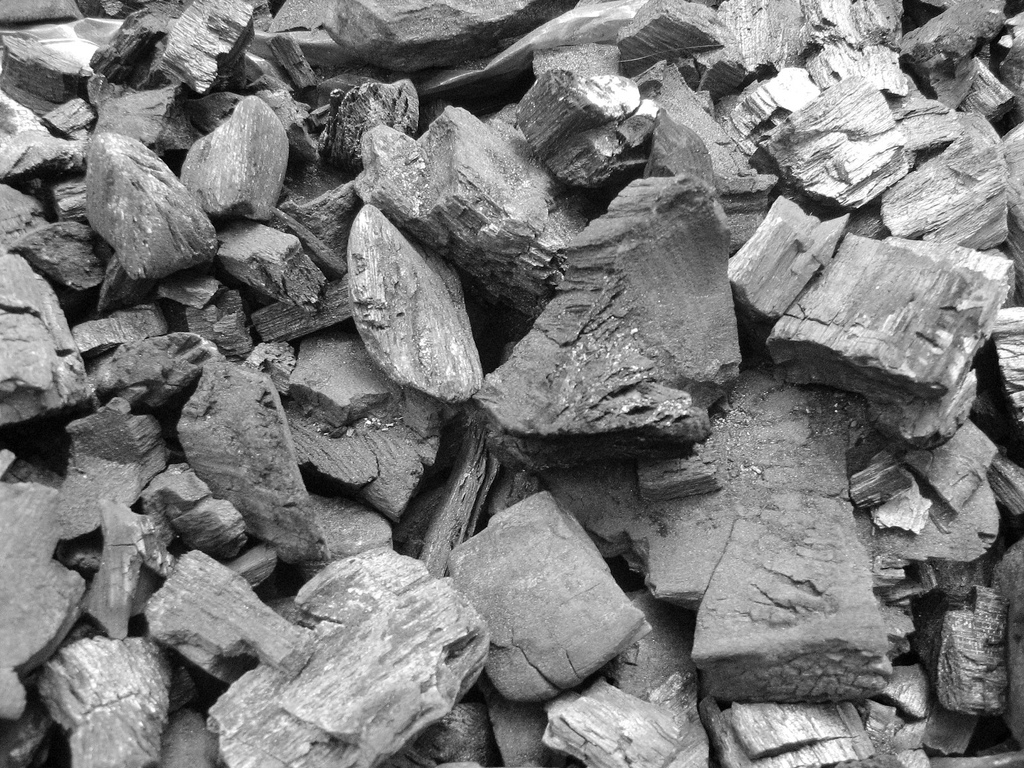
Modern charcoal

The distribution and occurrence of charcoal in sediments is widely used to understand paleo-wildfire events. Wildfires are natural events that burn wildlands - forests, grasslands, and prairies - and drive cyclical ecosystem turnover, which is traceable through charcoal records. Charcoal is the largest product of fire by volume and is often deposited in layers of sedimentary rocks and lake sediments. Charcoal is formed from incomplete combustion of vegetation in terrestrial ecosystems and its evidence describes fire disturbance regimes—frequency and intensity—and the rate of accumulation over time. Studies on charcoal as a fire proxy are scale-dependent and are broadly grouped into macroscopic charcoal, which refers to local wildfire events, and microscopic charcoal, which describes the regional scale of wildfire events. Evidence of charcoal records is important in studies of paleoecology and archived in the Global Charcoal Database, which has been used to aid the reconstruction of fire history, test hypotheses, and model fire-vegetation-climate relationship. This evidence of past fire regimes has been used to understand past vegetation changes, the evolution of plants on Earth, and other ecological processes driving the terrestrial and aquatic ecosystems.

== Macroscopic charcoal processing ==
Processing and analyzing charcoal records aids in the demonstration of charcoal occurrences and distribution, and understanding of fire-related concepts. To examine the intensity and frequency of local fire regimes, macroscopic charcoal remains (>125 μm) are processed using standard protocols in the laboratory and involves three stages.

The first stage involves measuring the sediment samples, treating them with 25 ml of 6% hydrogen peroxide to oxidize the organic matter, and heating them for 24 hours. This process leaves the charcoal intact but breaks down any organic matter present. Stage two involves sieving, washing, and rinsing the samples with deionized water, and drying them on a petri dish for 12 – 48 hours. Charcoal remains are sieved to sizes ranging from micro- (125-180 μm), meso- (180-250 μm) to macro-charcoal (>250 μm). Stage three is charcoal counting using the stereo microscope. When counting the charcoal, sorting them into different morphotypes is sometimes done, because it helps to understand the vegetation type and plant habit, such as woody or grassy, present at a given geologic time. The common morphotype classification of charcoal for plant record include dark, cellular, porous, fibrous, sponge, branched, lattice, and branched pits.

== Fire concepts ==
1. Fire triangle – Wildfires require the combination of three components: oxygen, ignition, and fuel. Oxygen is the most abundant element on planet Earth and a major contributing factor to fire events and life on Earth. Before the Cretaceous period, oxygen levels have changed significantly, although they have not changed much since the Cretaceous. Ignition is the combustion of fuel materials in the presence of oxygen. Sources of ignition include heat, lightning, human action, volcanoes, wildlife, and spontaneous combustion. Fuel is any organic or inorganic material that reacts to heat, and can be influenced by the quality and quantity of material, moisture content, decomposition rate, climate, biomass, and connectivity of materials. These three components often leave behind charcoal remains, which are used as evidence of fire history and disturbances as well as indicators of past ecological and biological processes.
2. Fire regimes – This is the spatial and temporal patterns and characteristics of fire activity. Wildfire regimes are typically driven by the vegetation type and weather, and are defined by the frequency, intensity, and size of fire activities. Other factors that affect fire regimes include previous fire records, succession stage after previous disturbances such as fire activity, moisture content and pest management.
3. Fire frequency – This is the number of times fire occurs in a given area in a defined geologic time. The concept of fire frequency is often applied to local fire events.
4. Fire intensity – Also known as fire severity or magnitude, this is the degree of fire or the magnitude of fire event. Fire intensity is categorized into low fire intensity and high fire intensity. Low fire intensity typically destroys understory forest vegetation and affects dispersal events while high fire intensity destroys forest sub-canopies and canopies and can cause ghost forests.
5. Fire interval – This is the time period between one fire event and another fire event within a given area. The time period for such wildfire event can be driven by vegetation type and temperature. Fire interval may also be known as fire rotation or fire cycle.

== Geochemical evidence ==
The amount of oxygen in the atmosphere is the main factor linked to the abundance of fire; this can be approximated by a number of proxies.

== Geological history of wildfire ==
Fires among the low, scrubby, wetland plants of the Silurian would have been limited in scope, and it was not until the forests of the Middle Devonian that large-scale wildfires could really gain a foothold. Fires began to proliferate in the high-oxygen, high-biomass period of the Carboniferous, where the coal-forming forests frequently burned. The coal that is the fossilised remains of those trees may contain as much as 10–20% charcoal by volume. These represent fires which may have had an approximately 100-year repeat cycle.

At the end of the Permian, oxygen levels plummeted, and fires became less common. In the early Triassic, after the largest naturally caused extinction event in Earth's history at the end of the Permian, there is an enigmatic coal gap, suggesting a very low biomass; this is accompanied by a paucity of charcoal throughout the entire Triassic period.

Fires became significant again in the late Jurassic through the Cretaceous. Charcoalified flowers are especially useful evidence for tracking the origin of the angiosperm lineage. Contrary to popular perception, there is no evidence of a global inferno at the end of the Cretaceous, when many lineages were driven to extinction, most notably all non-avian dinosaurs. The record of fire after this point is somewhat sparse until the advent of human intervention around half a million years ago, although this may be due to a lack of investigations into the fire record from this period.

== Ecological effects of wildfire ==
The effects of wildfire on Earth are broad and can be traced back to the Silurian period. Some common effects of wildfires are:

Disturbance – Wildfires are naturally occurring agents of disturbance that affect the natural environment and lead to the destruction of terrestrial ecosystems. Fire systems have contributed significantly in shaping the vegetation structure on Earth. For instance, the first record of fire disturbance to ecosystem functions dates back to 10 million years ago, during which increased fire activity destroyed woodland vegetation and created favorable space for the spread of C4 plants. This activity destroys the vegetation structure and species composition and consequently decreases ecosystem functions and services.

Ghost forests – High fire events in forest vegetation can lead to ghost forests. Ghost forests are former forest regions that are composed of dead and dried trees with declining ecosystem functions and services.

Increased erosion – Fire activities cause destruction of the vegetation cover, leading to the exposure of the topsoil to agents of erosion such as water and wind. This erosion washes away the topsoil, nutrients, minerals, and other biological organisms, thereby leaving the soil poor in nutrients and thus unsuitable for agricultural and domestic activities.

Heterogeneous landscape – Increased fire activity can cause the destruction and alteration of homogeneous landscapes, leading to a heterogeneous landscape. For example, the destruction of 20% of a forest area by fire promotes the spread of grasses and a change in the forest structure and species composition. Similarly, the destruction of a grassland by fire activity facilitates the washing of the topsoil by erosion and a loss of plant community and ecosystem services.

Loss of moisture – The frequency and intensity of fire activity can cause a loss in plant moisture content and decrease moisture availability for plant uptake due to vegetation and habitat destruction.

Destruction of forest canopy and understory vegetation – Fire activities of low intensity, also known as surface fire, can cause the destruction of forest understory vegetation, particularly grasses and herbaceous plants. Low fire intensity has a greater effect on the forest understory vegetation compared to forest trees, as it only affects tree bark, due to bark's insulating properties. On the other hand, wildfire activities can cause the destruction of forest canopies, which opens a window for understory vegetation to flourish due to the sudden increase in the amount of direct sunlight received.
