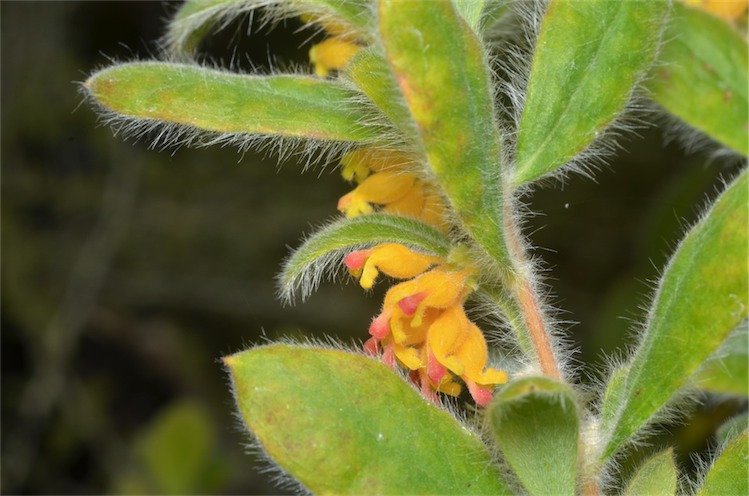
- In the Australian National Botanic Gardens

Conservation status
- Least Concern (IUCN 3.1)

Scientific classification
- Kingdom: Plantae
- Clade: Embryophytes
- Clade: Tracheophytes
- Clade: Spermatophytes
- Clade: Angiosperms
- Clade: Eudicots
- Order: Proteales
- Family: Proteaceae
- Genus: Grevillea
- Species: G. centristigma

Binomial name
- Grevillea centristigma (McGill.) Keighery

Synonyms
- Grevillea drummondii subsp. centristigma McGill.

= Grevillea centristigma =

Species of plant endemic to Western Australia

Grevillea centristigma is a species of flowering plant in the family Proteaceae and is endemic to the south-west of Western Australia. It is a low, compact to erect, rounded or spreading shrub with softly-hairy narrowly elliptic to egg-shaped leaves with the narrower end towards the base, and deep yellow to orange flowers with a yellow, later brick-red style.

== Description ==
Grevillea centristigma is a low, compact to erect, rounded or spreading shrub that typically grows to a height of 0.3–1 m (1 ft 0 in – 3 ft 3 in). Its leaves are narrowly elliptic to egg-shaped with the narrower end towards the base, 15–40 mm (0.59–1.57 in) long and 2–9 mm (0.079–0.354 in) wide, with the edges turned down and both surfaces sparsely covered with long soft hairs. The flowers are arranged in groups of five to eight on the ends of branchlets and are deep yellow to orange, the pistil 5–6 mm (0.20–0.24 in) long and covered with long, soft hairs, the style yellow, turning brick red as it ages. Flowering mostly occurs from June to November and the fruit is a hairy follicle 8–12 mm (0.31–0.47 in) long.

== Taxonomy ==
This grevillea was first formally described in 1986 by Donald McGillivray who gave it the name Grevillea drummondii subsp. centristigma in his book New Names in Grevillea (Proteaceae). In 1992, Gregory John Keighery elevated the subspecies to species status as Grevillea centristigma. The specific epithet (centristigma) means "centre stigma".

== Distribution and habitat ==
Grevillea centristigma grows in moist forest and is widespread between the Whicher Range, Collie and Walpole in the Jarrah Forest and Warren biogeographic regions of south-western Western Australia.

== Conservation status ==
This species is listed by the Government of Western Australia Department of Biodiversity, Conservation and Attractions as not threatened and as least concern on the IUCN Red List of Threatened Species.
