= Pyrogeography =

Study of the distribution of wildfires

Spatial pattern of fire and its primary controls: vegetation type, climate, and ignitions

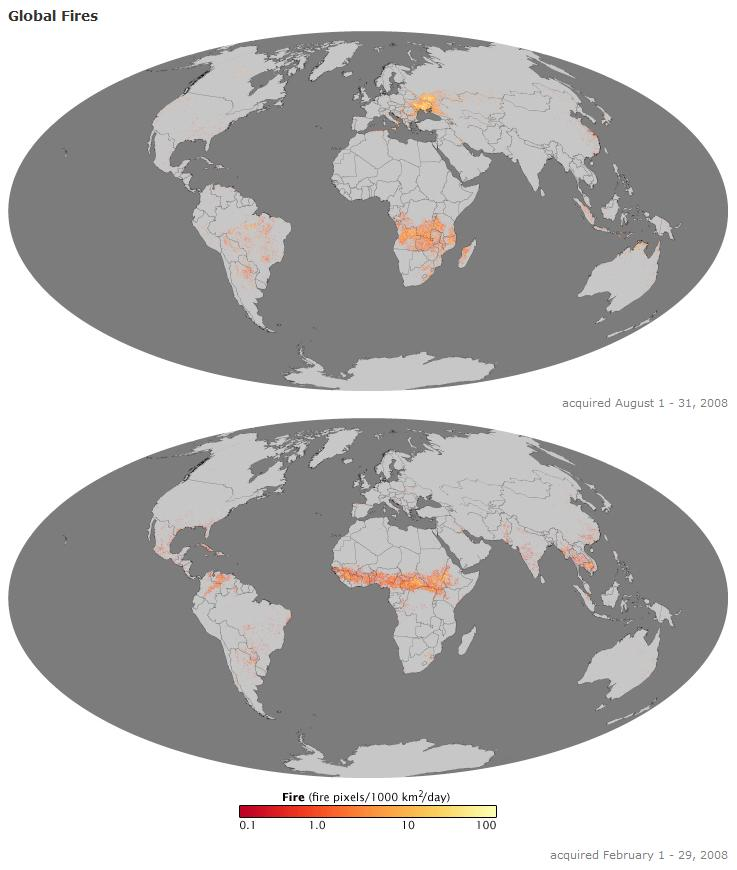
Patterns of fire in the year 2008

The seasonal cycle of greenness (NDVI index).

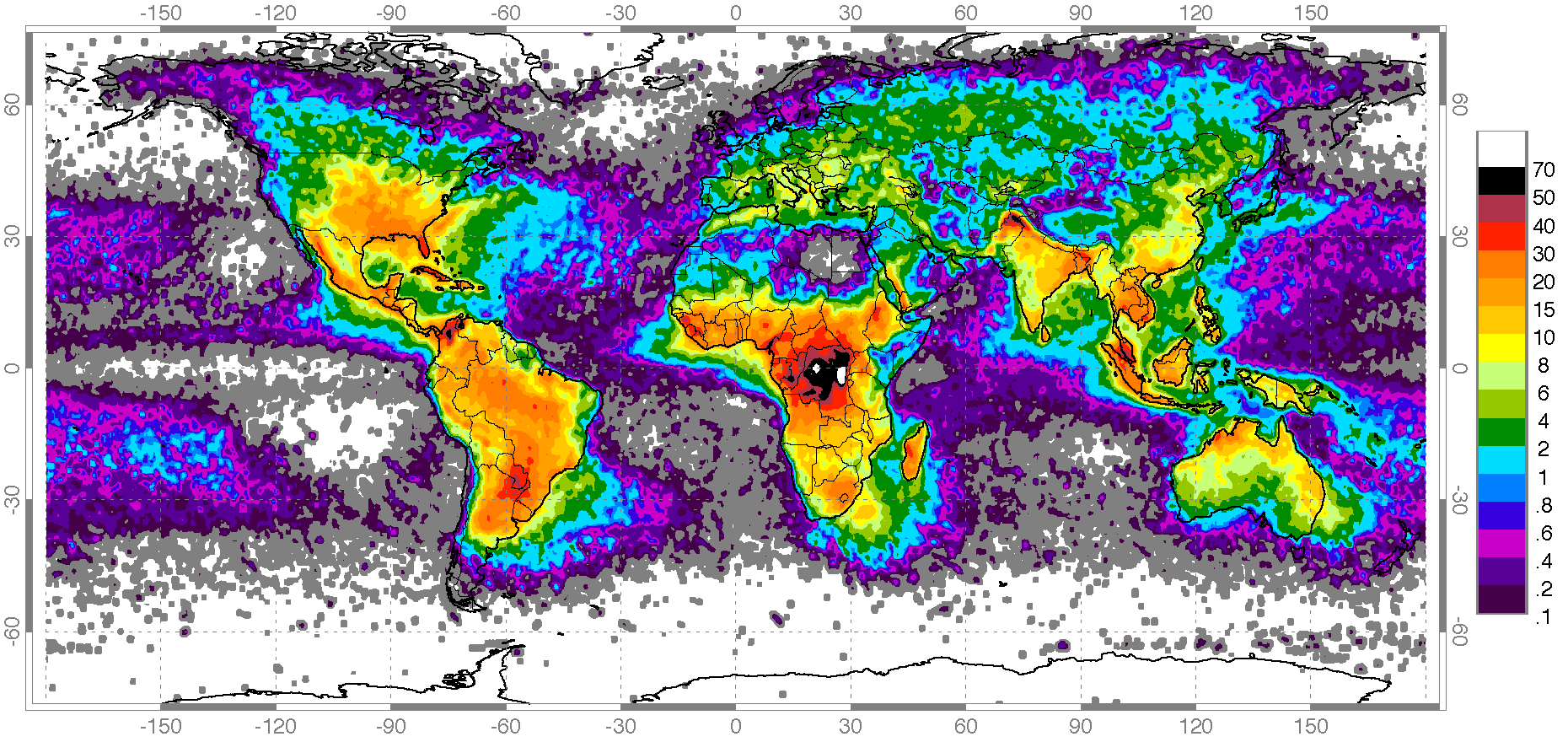
Lightning flashes/km2/yr, April 1995 to February 2003

Pyrogeography is the study of the past, present, and projected distribution of wildfire. Wildland fire occurs under certain conditions of climate, vegetation, topography, and sources of ignition, such that it has its own biogeography, or pattern in space and time. The earliest published evidence of the term appears to be in the mid-1990s, and the meaning was primarily related to mapping fires The current understanding of pyrogeography emerged in the 2000s as a combination of biogeography and fire ecology, facilitated by the availability of global-scale datasets of fire occurrence, vegetation cover, and climate. Pyrogeography has also been placed at the juncture of biology, the geophysical environment, and society and cultural influences on fire.

Pyrogeography often uses a framework of ecological niche concepts to evaluate the environmental controls on fire. By examining how environmental factors interact to facilitate fire activity, pyrogeographers can predict expected fire behavior under new conditions. Pyrogeographic research contributes to and informs land management policy in various regions across the globe.

== Concepts ==
=== The pyrogeography framework ===
Under the framework used in pyrogeography, there are three basic categories that control fire regimes across the world: consumable resources, ignitions and atmospheric conditions. Each of the three factors varies across space and time, causing and creating different fire regime types. Fire is a result of the intersection of these three components.

- Consumable resources - This term refers to the vegetation consumed as a fuel source in wildfires. Vegetation type can vary in productivity, structure, and flammability, and that variability will lead to different types of fire behavior or intensity.
- Ignitions - Fire is controlled in part by the availability of an ignition source. There are two primary sources of ignition for fire: natural and anthropogenic. The importance of these two sources varies according to region.
  - Natural Ignition: the primary form of natural ignition is lightning, though some fires may begin through other sources of ignition (such as volcanic activity).
  - Anthropogenic ignition: humans cause fires both intentionally and unintentionally.
- Atmospheric conditions - Weather conditions can determine whether an area is conducive to fire: hot, dry and/or windy weather may make fire more likely, while damp and cold conditions may decrease the probability of fire occurring.

By examining and quantifying this framework across time and space, pyrogeographers can examine the difference between fire regimes in different regions or time periods.

=== Fire variables ===
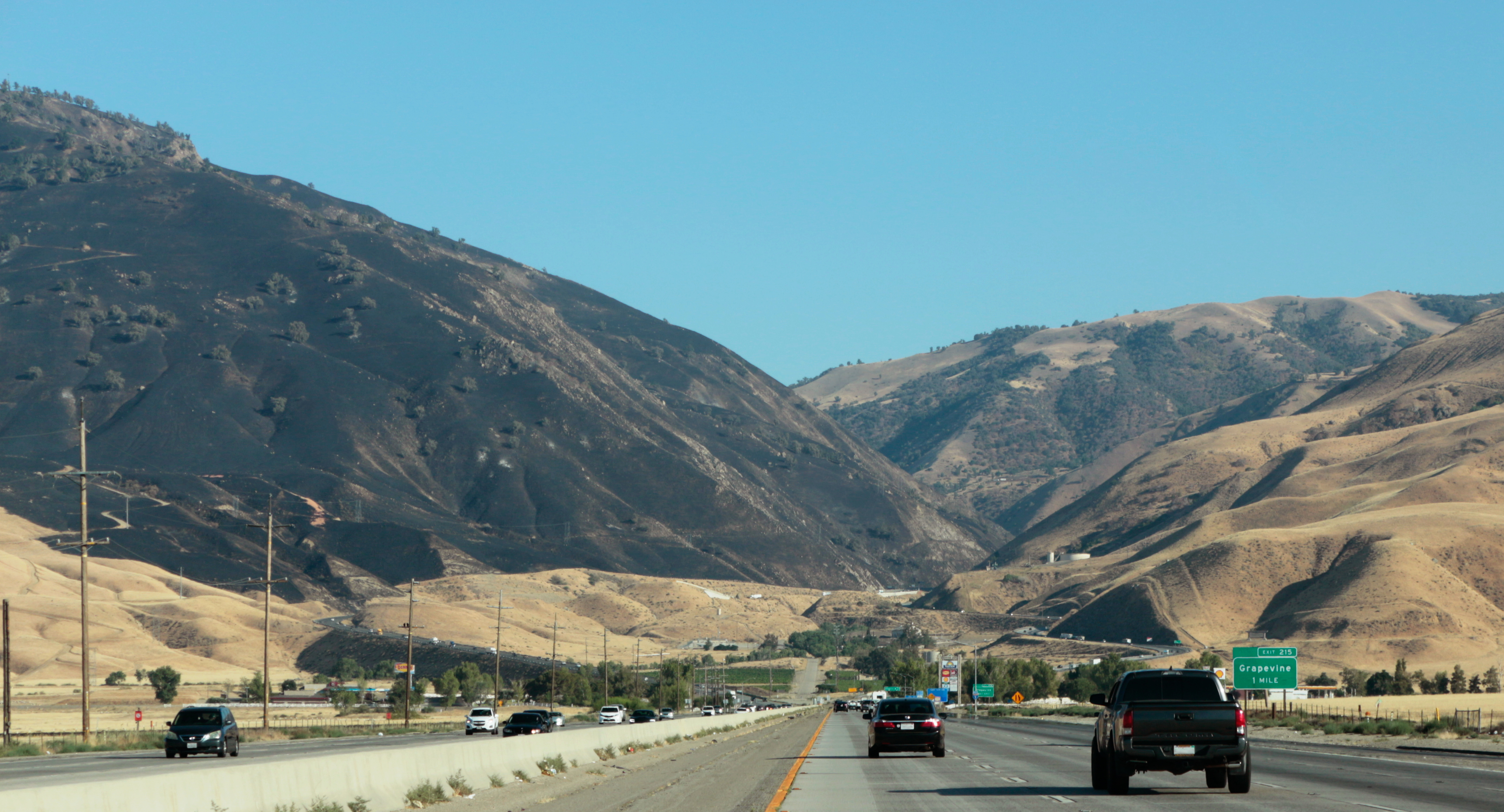
Large amounts of brush burned by the Tumbleweed Fire near Los Angeles, California, in July 2021

Several variables must be met for fire to occur, all of which are influenced by both natural and human factors. Due to the spatial and temporal characteristics of each variable, global fire behavior is a complex and fluid system to model and cannot be predicted by climate or vegetation alone.

==== Wind speed ====
Wind speed is the driving force behind rate of spread, or how quickly a fire moves through a landscape. It is influenced by the season, weather, topography, and land cover of a location. Wind speed is affected by human activity through anthropogenic climate change and land use change.

==== Fuel continuity ====
Fuel continuity is the distribution of fuel particles in a fuel bed, and affects the fire's ability to sustain combustion and spread. It is influenced by the terrain type, presence of water bodies, seasonality, and vegetation type/age. Human influences on continuity include artificial fuel breaks (roads, fire suppression tactics), habitat fragmentation, species displacement, and land management methods (patch burning, "slash and burn", etc.).

==== Fuel loads ====
Fuel load is the amount of available fuel per unit area. Can also be defined by amount of heat energy generated per unit area upon combustion. Natural influences include vegetation type/cover, presence of natural disturbances (such as insect outbreak, wind damage), herbivory, soil fertility, and seasonality. Human influences can involve grazing, logging, suppression tactics, fuel treatments (preventative measures), and land use change such as deforestation and agricultural development.

==== Fuel moisture ====
Fuel moisture is the measure of amount of water within fuels, and is expressed as a percent of dry weight of that fuel. Fuel moisture is affected by wind activity, season, antecedent rainfall, relative humidity, air temperature, and soil moisture. Human influences include anthropogenic climate change and land management activity (logging, grazing, burning).

==== Ignitions ====
Ignitions can be either natural or anthropogenic. Natural ignitions are generally limited to lightning strikes, but volcanism and other sources have been observed. Human-caused fire may be intentional (arson, fuel management methods) or unintentional. Natural factors affecting ignitions include lightning flashes, volcanoes, and seasonality. Human influences include population size, land management, road networks, and arson.

== Methodology ==
Pyrogeographers use many different methods to study the distribution of fire. To study fire across space, pyrogeographers use spatial data of fire activity, which may come in several forms including observations, satellite imagery, and historical evidence of fire. The emergence of pyrogeography as a field is closely linked to the availability of satellite imagery. Since the late 1970s when satellite data became widely-available, the seasonal and geographical patterns of fire activity have come under inquiry, leading to the development of the field.

=== Fire observation data ===
The observation of fire occurrence is an important piece of data in pyrogeography. Information on the occurrence of fire can be obtained from a variety of sources: historical and present. Historic fire observation data frequently comes from dendrochronology (tree ring records of fire) or other written historical records. Modern fire observations are often made with satellites: using aerial imagery, scientists can examine fire activity and the size of an area burned. Both forms of fire observation data are important for studying the distribution of fire.

=== Spatial distribution models ===
Spatial distribution models are used in pyrogeography to describe empirical relationships between fire and environmental factors. There are a number of statistical methods used to build and run these models. Most models consist of mapped fire observations compared against various independent variables (in this case, spatial environmental gradients such as topography or precipitation). The two of these components together produce a statistical model of fire probability that can be used to assess hypotheses or challenge assumptions. Some of the variables used include things like net primary productivity (NPP), annual precipitation, temperature or soil moisture. Models are especially important for pyrogeography since they can be used across areas where fire observation data may be incomplete or biased. Models with high reliability can be used to project or predict conditions in areas with little data or observations.

==== Climate-wildfire relationships ====
Perhaps the most important and encompassing relationship in pyrogeography is that between area burnt and net primary productivity.

In places with low net primary productivity, the necessary fire variables do not exist to allow fires to burn. For example, deserts have very low NPP given the arid climate, and do not build up sufficient fuel loads to sustain fire.

On the other hand, areas with very high net primary productivity are generally constrained by wet tropical weather patterns. This is seen in places such as tropical rainforests, where primary productivity is extremely high but the necessary weather conditions to dry out fuels do not exist.

It is in areas with intermediate levels of net primary productivity and climates with a seasonal pattern of sustaining fuel loads where fires regularly occur. Tropical savannas are a clear example of these conditions, where hot, wet growing seasons are followed by dry periods that desiccate fuels and provide ignitions for fire. These savannas are the most widespread flammable environments on Earth.

An example of the relationship between NPP and area burnt is seen in the western U.S., where dense conifer forests with high NPP experience infrequent stand-replacing fires, drier pine forests and chaparral shrublands experience fire at decadal intervals on average, and steppe shrubland experiences fire, at least historically, on multi-decadal or longer intervals.

=== Human influences on expanding the extent of fire ===
In dense forests (e.g., tropical rainforests), land use change and deforestation sharply increase the risk of wildfire by opening the forest canopy and thus reducing humidity and fuel moisture of surface fuels, and by targeted ignitions during otherwise low-lightning dry periods. This has been clearly demonstrated in the Amazon Basin and Indonesia, where massive deforestation and changing land use has altered the vast rainforest landscape and made it vulnerable to fire. The occurrence of fire has become much more frequent in tropical rainforest, as positive feedback loops between forest loss, fragmentation, and fire provide increasingly fire-conducive conditions. It is estimated that rainfall in the Amazon could fall as much as 20% due to large-scale deforestation.

Invasive species also may have a dramatic effect on changing the fuel type and fuel load, thereby increasing or decreasing the amount of fire.

== Applications of pyrogeography ==
=== Risk Management ===
Pyrogeography is also used to help inform development efforts and landscape management in regions that may be prone to fire. The expansion of suburbs and neighborhoods into regions that tend to burn frequently or intensely (such as parts of California) means that homeowners face increasing risks of wildfires spreading or starting in their area. Pyrogeography can be used to create maps of fire hazard in order to educate or inform landowners and communities. These maps may show which areas might be most prone to the most intense burning. Landowners and developers can use that information to plan either evacuation strategies or to avoid building in certain areas. There are other policies that can decrease fire risk: vegetation management and fire-resistant building materials (such as metal instead of wood) may help lower the risk of losing a home in a fire.

=== Land Management ===
The modeling of fire distribution through pyrogeographic methods helps inform land management. Distribution models of fire are used to evaluate land management practices in action, and can be used to determine if a particular practice (such as fuel treatment or removal) is working effectively or as predicted. One example of this is in the northern Central Valley of California: fire has been suppressed in the area for over a century due to agriculture, but spatial distribution models show that fire may have been more frequent in the past. Knowing that fire suppression has altered the natural frequency of fire in the area (and therefore perhaps altered the landscape) allows land managers, landowners and policy makers to inform ongoing efforts of natural restoration.

== Relationships to other disciplines ==
=== Paleoecology ===
Reconstructing the fire history of an area is very helpful in determining its climatic conditions and ecology. Knowledge of past fire regimes comes from geochemistry, tree ring analysis, charcoal, written documents and archeology. Each data source has advantages and disadvantages. For the purposes of paleoecology, charcoal data from lake and soil core samples provides information dating back millennia, enabling accurate climate reconstruction based on the relationship of fire regimes to vegetation and climate. Charcoal must first be extracted or washed from the sediments of a core sample. It is then placed on a plate and counted under a microscope. The sediment layer charcoal counts are plotted on a graph, showing when and with what intensity fires occurred. The highest peaks, where the most charcoal is found, correspond to more intense fire. Different ecosystems are more susceptible to fire due to climatic factors and what kinds of vegetation is present. This relationship between fire and vegetation present is used to make inferences about the climate at that time, based on the amount and kinds of charcoal found. Different types of vegetation leave different charcoal. The job of the paleoecologist is to count and determine the quantity and kinds of charcoal present. These counts are later studied and analyzed in conjunction with other data sources. This allows the use of fire as a proxy for the reconstruction of climates in the distant past. The effects of the fire can be seen using processes like loss on ignition. Soil chemistry is analyzed to determine changes in mineral and carbon percentages as a result of fire. Historical data may reveal the source or cause of fire. Pollen data provides information on vegetative species present before and after the fire. Fire-induced soil susceptibility to magnetism can reveal fire-regime characteristics that pre-date recorded history and provide insight into fire-regimes at the time of soil formation. All of these proxies help construct the ecosystem of the studied area.

=== Archaeology ===
Fire became a regular technology for many Hominina populations between 400 thousand and 300 thousand years ago; humans have had a relationship with fire for many hundreds of thousands of years. Humans influence the pyrogeographic framework in more ways than in providing an ignition source: our actions and behaviors may also change vegetation, climate, and suppress lightning ignitions, thus significantly affecting fire regimes.

== See also ==
- Wildfire
- Fire ecology
- Fire regime
- Species distribution
