= Fire history =

Fire history, the ecological science of studying the history of wildfires, is a subdiscipline of fire ecology. Patterns of forest fires in historical and prehistorical times provide information relevant to the vegetation pattern in modern landscapes. It gives an estimate of a natural disturbance regime's historical range of variability and can be used to identify the processes affecting fire occurrence.

The history of fire can provide information about many fire regime characteristics including fire frequency and severity. Fire history can be analyzed by looking at satellite imagery. Reconstructions are achieved by compiling atlases of past fires, using the tree ring record from fire scars and tree cores. Charcoal records from lake sediment cores can also be used.

== Prehistoric fires ==
Sustained wildfire can only exist once oxygen levels and fuel sources are present in sufficient quantities. Between 400 and 450 million years ago, fire became a landscape feature. The presence of fusain (fossil charcoal), beginning in the early Carboniferous attests to this fire history and forms an important element of the Cretaceous–Paleogene boundary.

== Satellite data ==
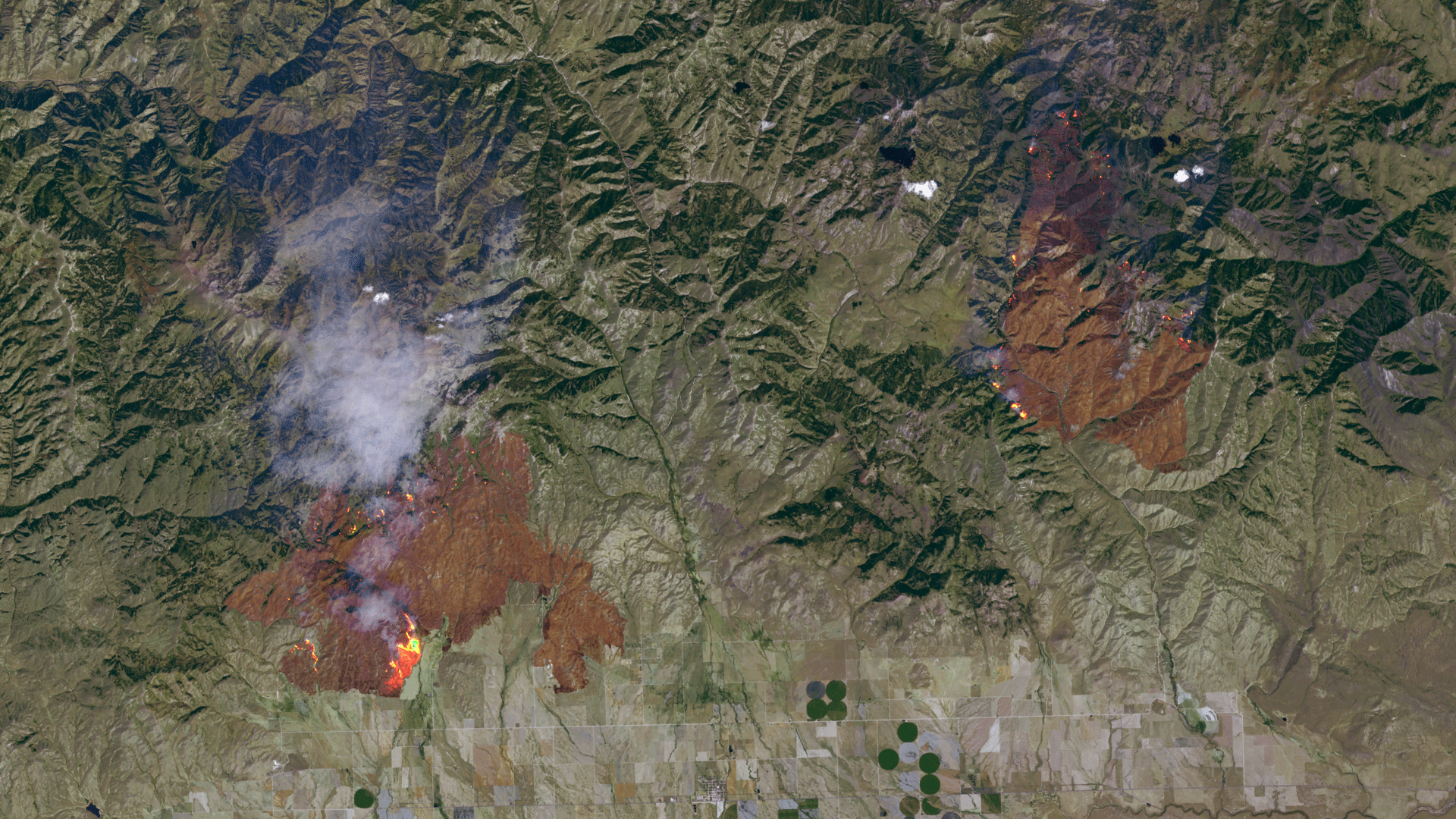
Satellite imagery of multiple fires in Idaho taken by the Landsat-8 satellite

Fire history across the globe can be determined using satellite data that Landsat satellites began collecting in the 1970s. Multiple characteristics of fire regimes can be determined using satellite data. Satellite images show the exact location, extent, and severity of wildfires. Ecosystem recovery after wildfire can be tracked using satellite images. The Monitoring Trends in Burn Severity program, organized by the United States Department of Agriculture and United States Geological Survey, creates maps of large fires that show severity and extent. These records extend back to 1984 and are specifically focused on the United States.

== Obtaining fire history from trees ==
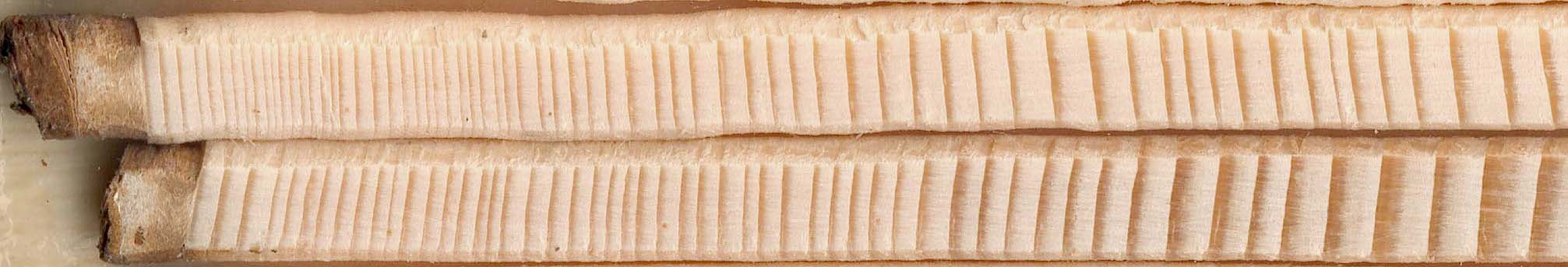
Tree core sample collected with an increment boarer

=== Tree cores ===
The growth record of a tree in seasonal climates is preserved in the growth rings in the stem wood; the field of dendrochronology is the study of the record of climate and other events preserved in the growth record. Each growth ring represents one year of life. The thickness of each ring indicates the amount of wood produced during that growing season. Large cells can quickly divide rapidly at the beginning of the growing season, creating a light-colored wood. When growth slows down, generally in colder months, a darker wood is created from smaller cells, dividing more slowly. Thus, one year is represented by a light inner ring and a darker outer ring.

Rings can be counted from dead trees and stumps left behind from logging. A sample can be collected from a living tree using tools like the increment borer. The increment borer is a hollow steel tube that extracts a core sample from a tree’s trunk. The growth rings in a core sample are counted to determine the age of that tree. The ages of stand-replacing fires may be determined by determining the cohort age of trees established after a fire. For example, tree-ring dating of large stands will show the age of the forest and may provide an estimate of when the last significant disturbance event occurred.

=== Fire scars ===
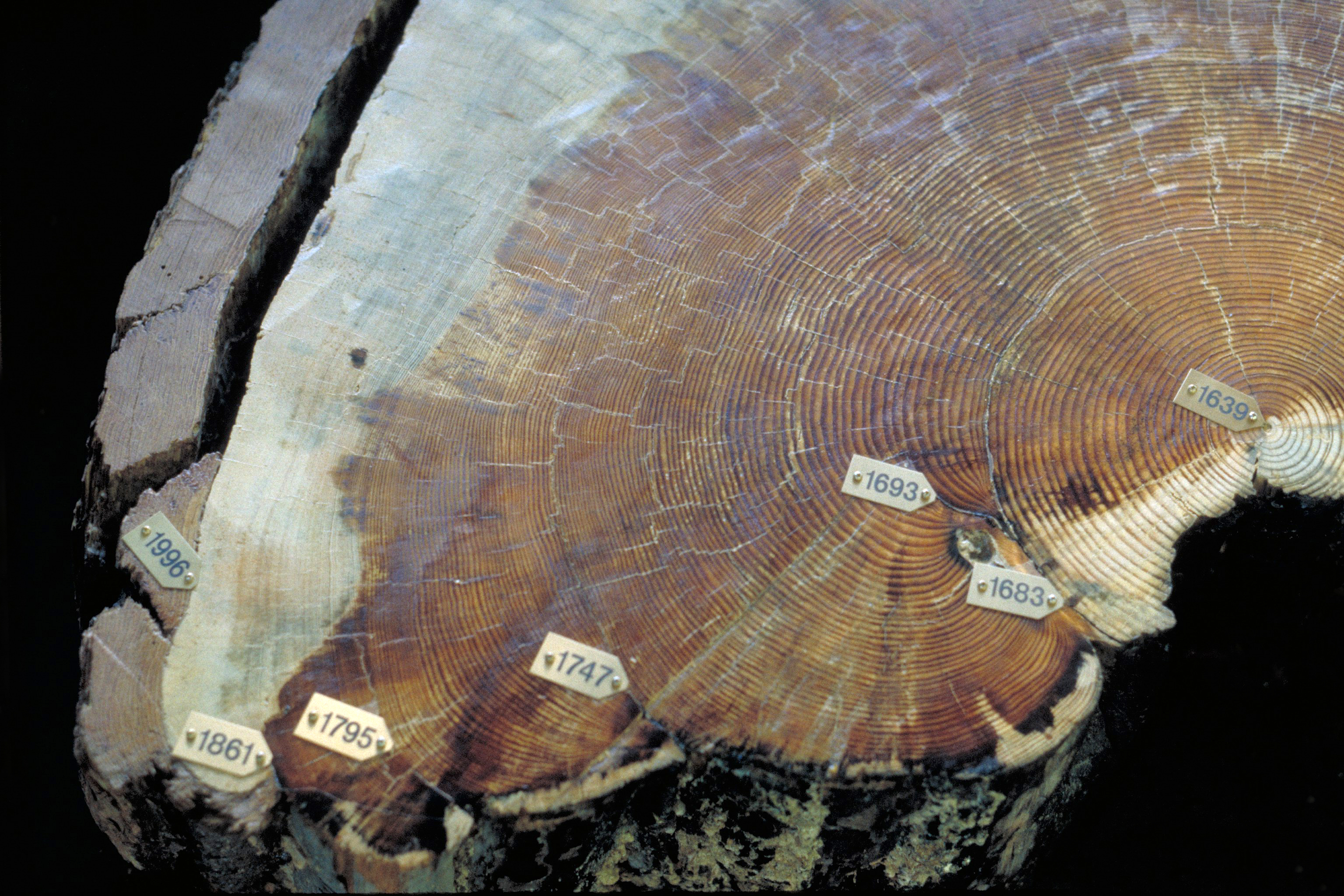
A cross section of a ponderosa pine fire scar showing several dated fire events

Sometimes, growth rings exhibit scars. A fire scar forms when heat kills the vascular cambium beneath the bark, which then heals over subsequent years as growth rings curl over the scarred area, thus protecting the tree from infection. This method can be used to date the year a fire occurred. Observing the scars establishes the timeline of a forest fire and the time between fires at a site. Surveying many trees over a large sample area provides a view to individual fire events and the overall fire regime. Not all tree species scar and show evidence of fire. Most pine species in the subgenus Pinus readily produce scars protected by resin; scarring on other trees may result in death, leaving no fire record behind. Scarred trees are mostly found in places where the historic fire regime is low severity. Fire-scar samples from North America date as far back as 1237 BCE.

=== Research and data examples ===
Before Euro-American settlement in western North America, fire histories from scars preserved in ponderosa pine forests often reveal a pattern of frequent fire (often with 5 to 20-year intervals in a single area), with a pattern in time and space strongly related to past variations in climate. Fuel reduction from grazing and fire suppression significantly reduced the amount of fire in dry forests over the last 100 years.

A study by Arne Buechiling and William L. Baker in 2004 identified 41 fire events beginning in 1533 in a 9200-ha study area north of Estes Park, Colorado. They sampled 3461 tree cores and 212 fire scars. Fire scar data provided greater insight into the fire event parameters. Of the 41 fires, 22 were high-severity crown fires, seven low-severity surface fires, and eight mixed-severity fires. Fires larger than 300 ha were few but composed a substantial proportion of the area burned since 1700. Drought periods produced larger fires.

There is little known about the history of fires in some places. Central Europe, for instance, lacks intact forests with old-growth trees or an abundance of dead or cut-down trees that can be used to reconstruct past fire regimes. The Bialowieza Primeval Forest in Poland is an exception to this condition. A group of researchers were able to use a 350-year tree-ring fire record to reconstruct the fire history in precise detail. This is an example of how the method can be used in a place with a lost or no written history of a fire regime.

== Sediment cores ==
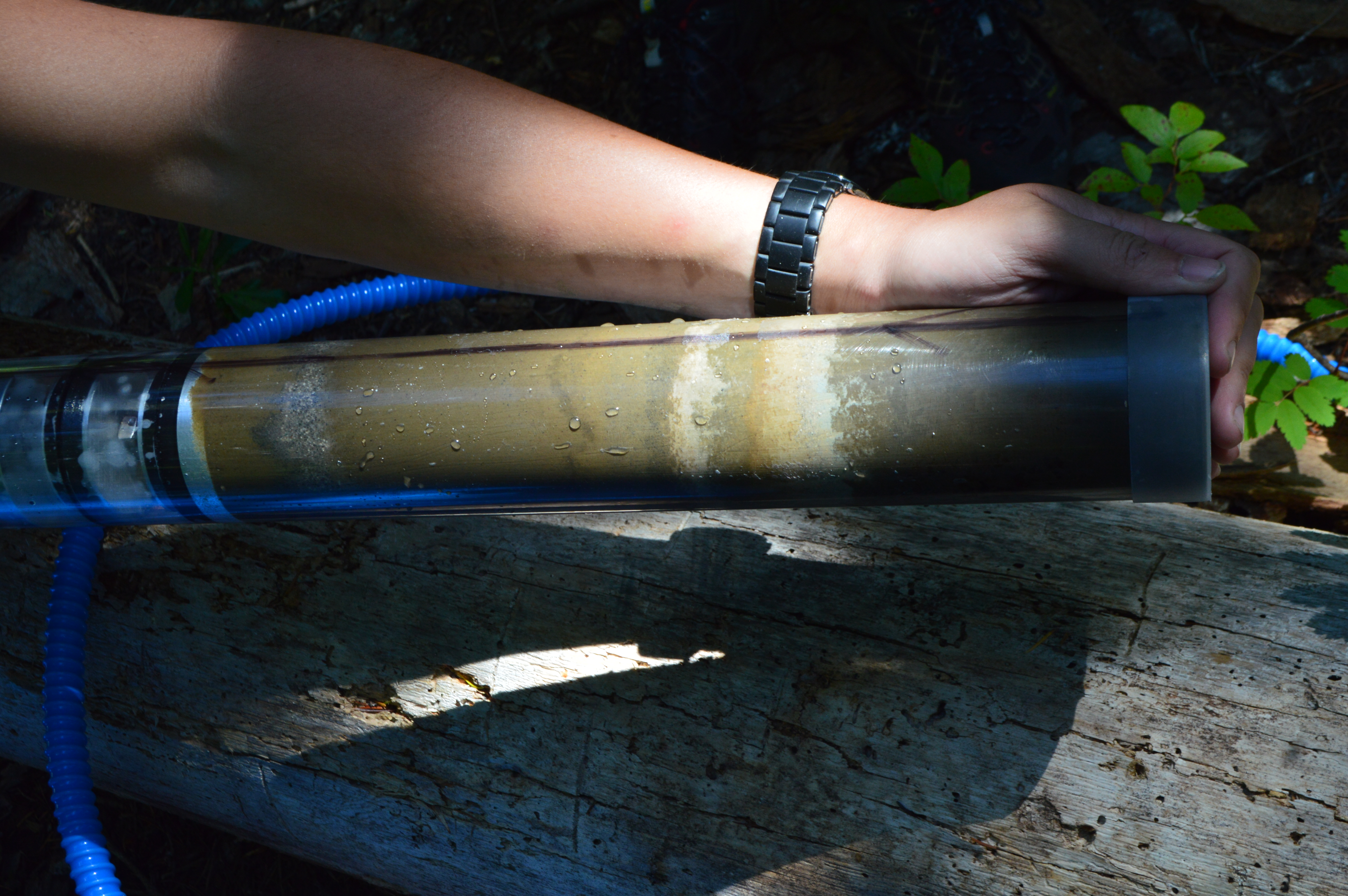
A lake sediment core from a lake in the state of Washington in the United States

Sediment cores are typically taken from lake beds. These cores can provide data for thousands of years back in time. Cores are extracted then cut into slices to be analyzed. Three main categories of data can be determined from the cores including, age, charcoal levels, and amount and types of pollen. Age can be determined by using radiocarbon dating. Pollen amount and types can show the dominant vegetation and what types of plants existed in the given time period. Measuring the size and distribution of charcoal particles can be used to estimate fire frequency. Charcoal particles are measured to the microscopic level (<100 microns) and peaks are analyzed to determine regional fire frequency.

== See also ==
- Fire ecology
- Pyrogeography
- Fossil record of fire
