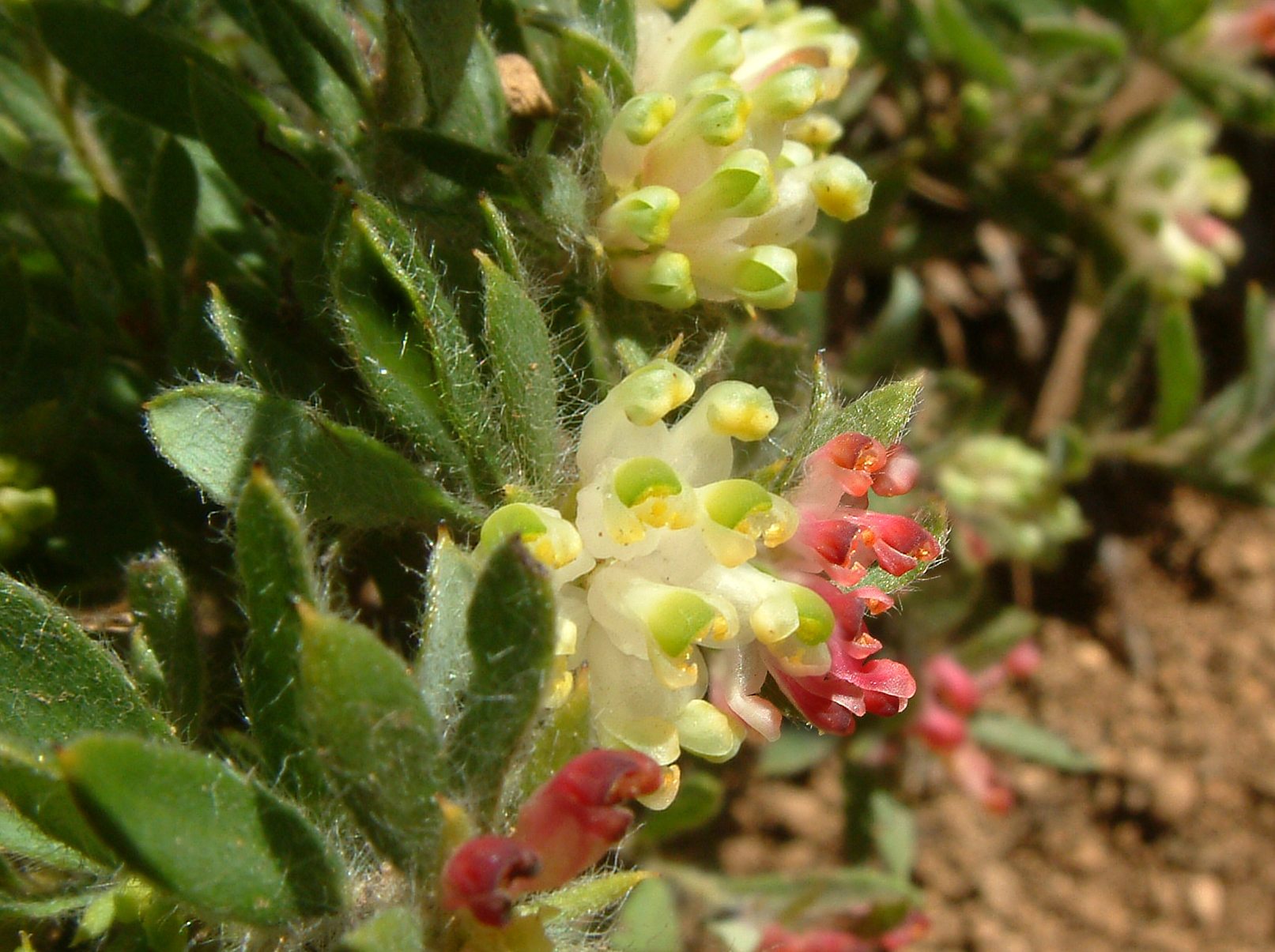

Conservation status
- Vulnerable (IUCN 3.1)

- Priority Four — Rare Taxa (DEC)

Scientific classification
- Kingdom: Plantae
- Clade: Embryophytes
- Clade: Tracheophytes
- Clade: Spermatophytes
- Clade: Angiosperms
- Clade: Eudicots
- Order: Proteales
- Family: Proteaceae
- Genus: Grevillea
- Species: G. drummondii

Binomial name
- Grevillea drummondii Meisn.

= Grevillea drummondii =

Drummond's grevillea

Species of shrub native to Western Australia

Grevillea drummondii, commonly known as Drummond's grevillea, is a species of flowering plant in the family Proteaceae and is endemic to the south-west of Western Australia. It is a low, spreading to erect shrub with narrowly elliptic to narrowly egg-shaped leaves with the narrower end towards the base, and dense groups of cream-coloured flowers that turn pink or red as they age.

== Description ==
Grevillea drummondii is a low, spreading to erect shrub that typically grows to a height of 0.2–2 m (7.9 in – 6 ft 6.7 in). Its leaves are narrowly elliptic to narrowly egg-shaped with the narrower end towards the base, 10–30 mm (0.39–1.18 in) long and 1.5–5 mm (0.059–0.197 in) wide, the edges turned slightly down. Both surfaces of the leaves usually have a few shaggy hairs. The flowers are arranged on the ends of the branchlets in dense groups of six to eight on a rachis 1–3 mm (0.039–0.118 in) long. The flowers are cream-coloured, turning pink or red as they age, the pistil 4–5 mm (0.16–0.20 in) long. Flowering occurs from June to December and the fruit is an oval follicle 12–14 mm (0.47–0.55 in) long.

== Taxonomy ==
Grevillea drummondii was first formally described in 1845 by Carl Meissner in Johann Georg Christian Lehmann's Plantae Preissianae from specimens collected by James Drummond near the Swan River. The specific epithet (drummondii) honours the collector of the type specimens.

== Distribution and habitat ==
This grevillea grows in woodland and shrubland on gravelly soil between Bindoon and Bolgart in the Avon Wheatbelt, Geraldton Sandplains, Jarrah Forest and Swan Coastal Plain biogeographic regions of south-western Western Australia.

== Conservation status ==
Drummond's grevillea is listed as vulnerable on the IUCN Red List of Threatened Species. Its habitat has been severely fragmented due to land clearing for road construction and agriculture, causing an inferred population decline of around 30% over the past 75 years, or three of this species' generational lengths. It is currently limited to an estimated extent of occurrence of 5,715 km^{2} (2,207 sq mi) and is in decline due to threats such as clearance of road verges where it occurs, inappropriate fire regimes and invasion from weeds. It is unknown if this species is susceptible to dieback, a disease caused by the plant pathogen Phytophtora.

It is also classified as priority four by the Government of Western Australia Department of Biodiversity, Conservation and Attractions, meaning that it is rare or near threatened.
