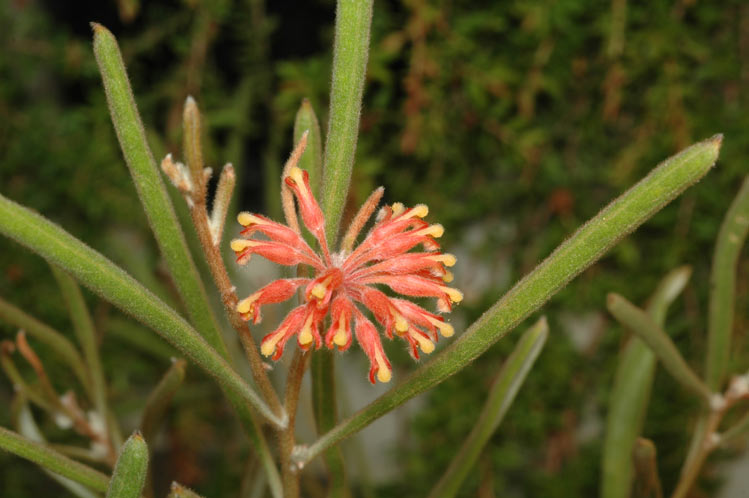
- In the Australian National Botanic Gardens

Conservation status
- Least Concern (IUCN 3.1)

Scientific classification
- Kingdom: Plantae
- Clade: Embryophytes
- Clade: Tracheophytes
- Clade: Spermatophytes
- Clade: Angiosperms
- Clade: Eudicots
- Order: Proteales
- Family: Proteaceae
- Genus: Grevillea
- Species: G. fistulosa

Binomial name
- Grevillea fistulosa A.S.George

= Grevillea fistulosa =

Species of shrub endemic to Western Australia

Grevillea fistulosa, commonly known as Barrens grevillea or Mount Barren grevillea, is a species of flowering plant in the family Proteaceae and is endemic to the Fitzgerald River National Park in the south-west of Western Australia. It is an erect shrub with narrowly egg-shaped to broadly linear leaves and clusters of orange-red to scarlet flowers.

== Description ==
Grevillea fistulosa is an erect shrub that typically grows to a height of 0.5–2 m (1 ft 8 in – 6 ft 7 in). Its leaves are narrowly shaped with the narrower end towards the base to oblong or broadly linear, 25–90 mm (0.98–3.54 in) long and 5–15 mm (0.20–0.59 in) wide. The edges of the leaves are turned down or rolled under, the upper surface of the leaves more or less smooth, the lower surface felty or woolly-hairy or obscured. The flowers are arranged in leaf axils or on the ends of branches, usually in erect in clusters of ten to fourteen flowers on a rachis 1–2 mm (0.039–0.079 in) long. The flowers are orange-red to scarlet, the pistil 6–8 mm (0.24–0.31 in) long. Flowering occurs from July to December and the fruit is an oval follicle 12–14 mm (0.47–0.55 in) long.

== Taxonomy ==
Grevillea fistulosa was first formally described in 1974 by Alex George in the journal Nuytsia from specimens collected on Middle Mount Barren in the Fitzgerald River National Park by Charles Gardner and William Blackall in 1925. The specific epithet (fistulosa) means "hollow like a pipe", referring to the leaves.

== Distribution and habitat ==
Barrens grevillea grows in dense scrub in rocky gullies on hills in the Fitzgerald River National Park.

== Conservation status ==
This grevillea is listed as least concern on the IUCN Red List of Threatened Species and not threatened by the Department of Biodiversity, Conservation and Attractions. Although it has a small, restricted range, its population is typically stable and it is not facing any major threats, either currently or in the near future. Its range is mostly within a protected area, therefore additional protection and conservation measures are not currently required.

== See also ==
- List of Grevillea species
