= Fusain =

Type of fossil deposit

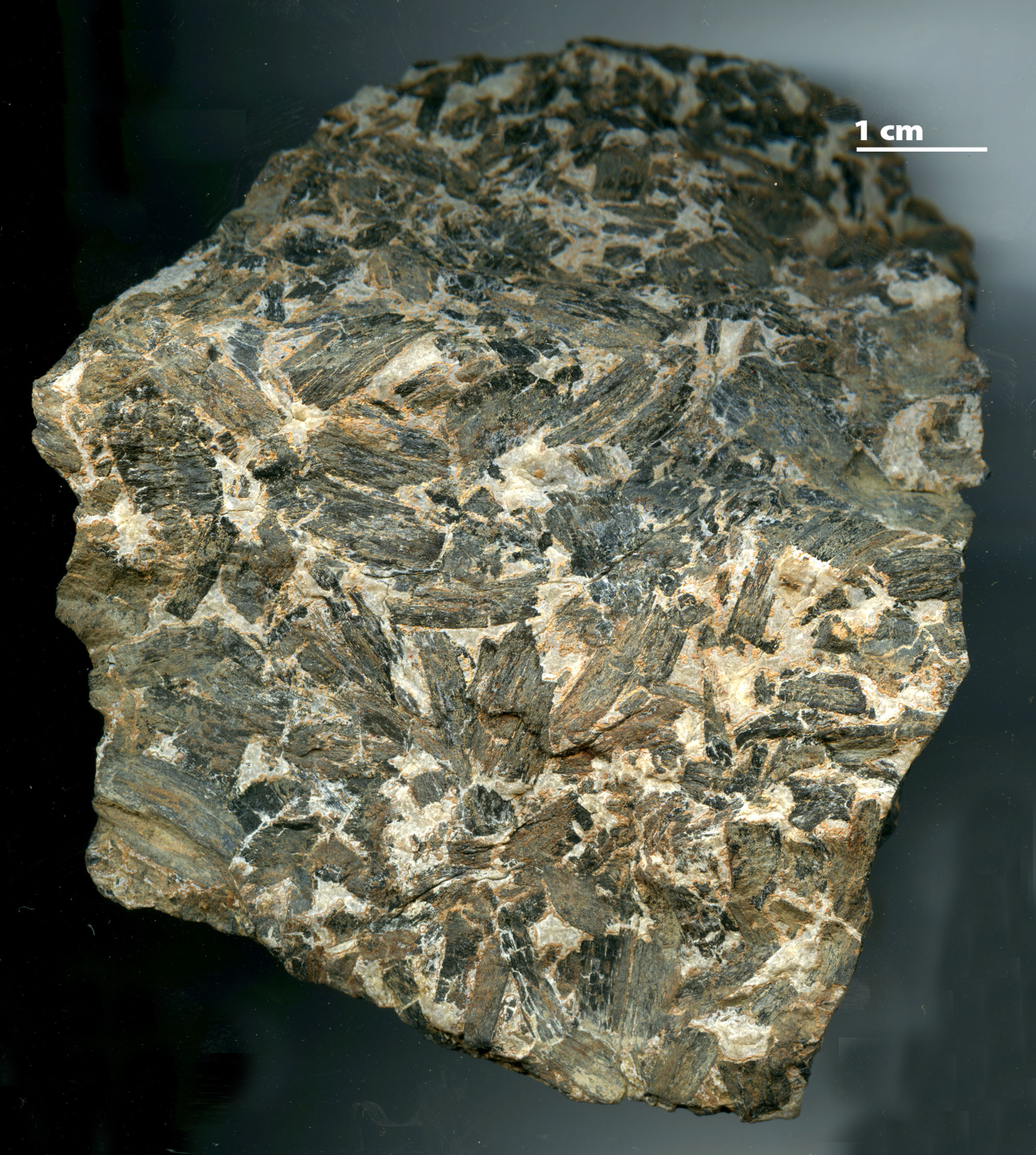
An example of fusain, charcoal that has been fossilized, found at a spoil pile from an underground coal mine in Grundy County, Illinois, US

Fusain is a fossilised carbon deposit which has been identified as fossilised charcoal. There has been some controversy over its origin, whether it derives from logs under wet, anaerobic conditions or from charcoal associated with wildfires. Its origin from charcoal was decided to best fit the evidence by Tom Harris in the 1950s.

It is fibrous, black and opaque, and often preserves details of cell wall architecture. Wood-derived fusain usually takes the form of cubic blocks, whereas fusain from other plant material may take the form of thin films which are only visible under a microscope where the surrounding rock is dissolved by acid maceration. The material is silky and crumbles on the touch. The loss of volatile elements during combustion means that fusain fossils are usually smaller than the original organism, but this same factor makes them unlikely to be eaten by any animals (for they have no nutritional value), enhancing their preservation potential.

Fusain shows characteristics diagnostic of pyrolysis in modern material: the cell walls of xylem are homogenized, and subsequently crack along their middles.
