= Fire regime =

Area-specific culture of fires

A fire regime is the pattern, frequency, and intensity of the bushfires and wildfires that prevail in an area over long periods of time. It is an integral part of fire ecology, and renewal for certain types of ecosystems. A fire regime describes the spatial and temporal patterns and ecosystem impacts of fire on the landscape, and provides an integrative approach to identifying the impacts of fire at an ecosystem or landscape level. If fires are too frequent, plants may be killed before they have matured, or before they have set sufficient seed to ensure population recovery. If fires are too infrequent, plants may mature, senesce, and die without ever releasing their seed.

Fire regimes can change with the spatial and temporal variations in topography, climate, and fuel. Understanding the historic fire regime is important for understanding and predicting future fire regime changes and the interactions between fire and climates.

== Characteristics ==
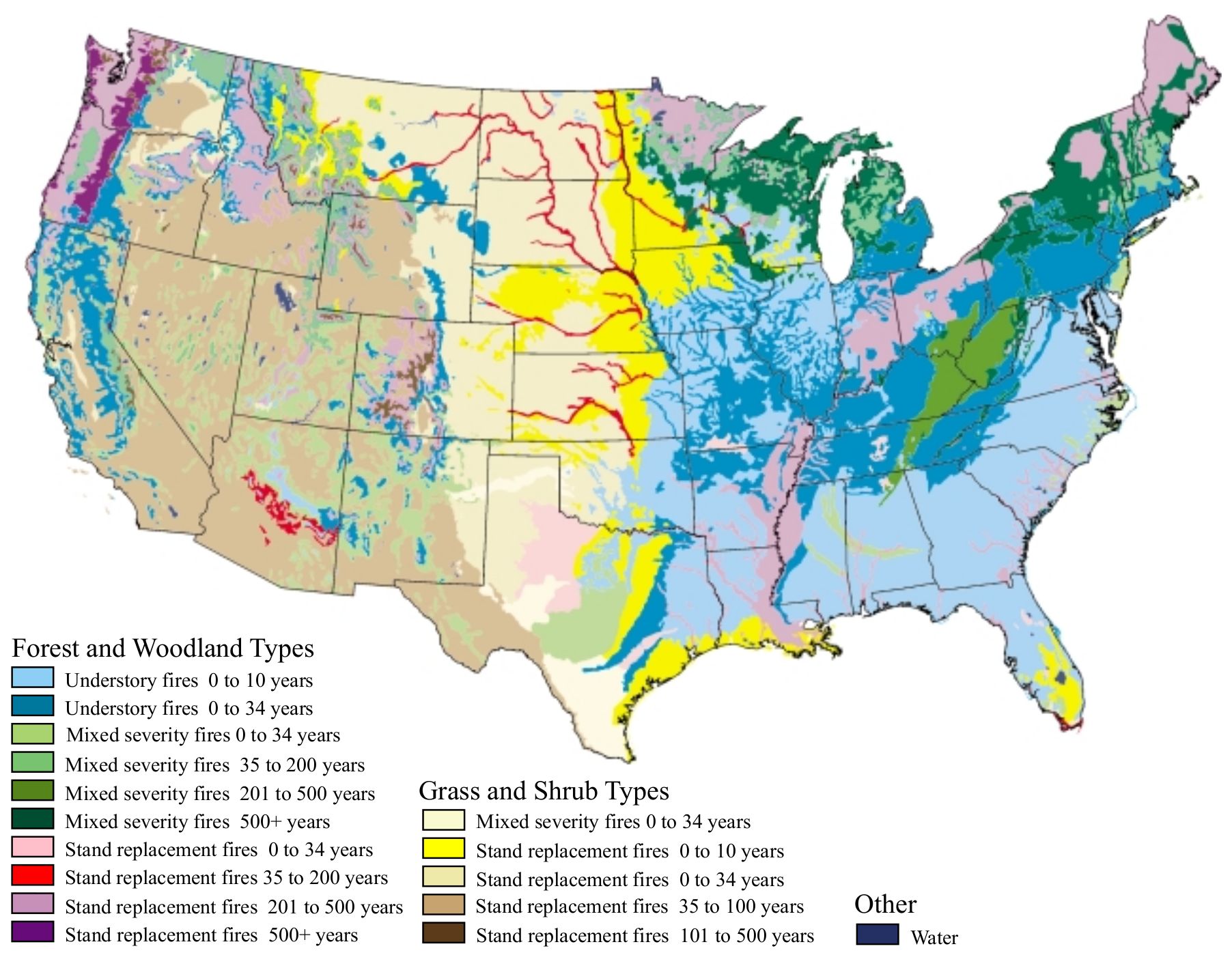
Fire regime classification by ecosystem type in the continental United States. Fire severity and frequency is linked to vegetation type.

Fire regimes are characterized by a variety of factors including vegetation composition, fuel structure, climate and weather patterns, and topography. Because fire regimes are highly dependent on the landscape and ecosystem in which they occur, there is no standard classification for fire regimes. However, characteristics such as those described below are commonly used to characterize fire regimes on a broad scale. Other factors such as post-disturbance successional stages and types of previous management on the landscape may also be used to describe a fire regime's characteristics. Climate directly impacts the frequency, size, and severity of fires, while also affecting the vegetation structure and composition. Fire regimes are also impacted by topography, slope exposure, landscape management, and ignition (which may be human or lightning-caused). Animals are another agent capable of affecting and changing fire regime by modifying control factors of fires such as amount, structure, or condition of fuel.

Although characteristics of fire regimes can vary based on regional differences, at a minimum fire regimes are characterized based on an assessment of the impacts on the vegetation (severity) and when and how often fires occur in a given landscape (expressed as fire interval and fire rotation). Fire severity is the impact of fire on the ecosystem, which may include the degree of vegetative mortality, the depth of burn, or other factors which may be site specific. The fire interval is the number of years between fires and is highly dependent on spatial scales. Fire rotation is a measure of the amount of fire in a landscape (the amount of time required to burn an area the size of the study area). The fire rotation statistic is best used for large areas that have mapped historic fire events.

Other fire regime classifications may incorporate fire type (such as ground fires, surface fires, and crown fires), fire size, fire intensity, seasonality, and degree of variability within fire regimes. Ground fires use glowing combustion to burn organic matter in the soil. Surface fires burn leaf litter, fallen branches, and ground plants. Crown fires burn through to the top layer of tree foliage. Fire-line intensity is the energy released per unit of measurement per unit of time and is usually a description of flaming combustion. Seasonality is the period of time during the year that the fuels of a specific ecosystem can ignite.

Hardesty et al. concluded that the earth's ecoregions and major terrestrial habitat types can be generally classified as fire-dependent/fire influenced, fire-sensitive, or fire-independent, based on historic characteristics like fire frequency (including the absence of fire), severity, intensity, spatial scale, seasonality, and predominant ignition source. They assessed a subset of the Global 200 ecoregions, identified by the WWF as priorities for biodiversity conservation, and found 46% of the ecoregions have fire-dependent/fire influenced fire regimes, 36% fire-sensitive, and 18% fire-independent. 84% of these ecoregions were at risk from altered fire regimes, including too much fire, too little fire, or fire during the wrong season or wrong intensity, and 16% of the ecoregion land area assessed had fire regimes consistent with ecosystem health. Tropical moist broadleaf forests, which are mostly fire-sensitive ecosystems composed of plants and animals which generally lack adaptations to major fires, were the most threatened, with 93% the assessed land area in that the habitat type experiencing altered fire regimes. 77% of the land area in fire-dependent ecoregions have altered fire regimes.

== Spatial and temporal scales ==
Fire regimes can be characterized by a wide variety of spatial and temporal scales which may range from highly site-specific to regional scales and from a few years to thousands of years. Understanding the variability of the fire regime across these scales is crucial to understanding fire regimes and accomplishing conservation or management goals. Distinctions should be made between "fire history" and "historic fire regimes". Fire history is a more general term that measures the frequency of fires in a landscape. It may not always be possible to describe the type or severity of these past fire events depending on data availability. Historic fire regimes describe the characteristics of fires across a landscape and the relationship and interactions between ecosystem structure and processes.

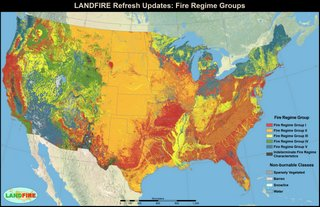
LANDFIRE (Landscape Fire and Resource Management Planning Tools), is a collaborative program between the U.S. Department of Agriculture and Department of the Interior that provides geospatial data on fire regime characteristics such as vegetation, habitat, carbon sources/sinks, fire, etc. The data is used to help map fire events and look at broad scale fire regime effects.

== Mapping ==
Recent fire history can be recorded on fire maps and atlases, often using remote sensing. The Canadian National Fire Database is a record of large fire events since 1980, is the first nationwide database of its kind. It includes point locations of all fires larger than 200 ha from 1959–1999. The United States has the Monitoring Trends in Burn Severity (MTBS) Project which uses satellite data to map fires from 1984 onward. MTBS maps fire severity within the areas burned and provides a standard on fire perimeters and severity for all fires within the U.S. Applications for projects such as these are used in modeling interactions between fire climate and vegetation.

The Landscape Fire and Resource Management Planning Tools (LANDFIRE) classification is another example of a mapping and modeling system used in the U.S. that collects and analyzes vegetative, fire, and fuel characteristics of fire regimes across a variety of landscapes. LANDFIRE is unique in that it uses both historic fire regimes and current fire regimes to analyze differences between past and present characteristics. It describes fire regimes based on their fire frequencies and severities which helps detect changes in fire regimes over time which is helpful in assessing fire climate effects at regional and landscape scales.

== Aging past fire events ==
Understanding historic fire regimes can be difficult, as fire history data is not always reliable or available. Past fire events can be identified using fire scar analysis on trees, age distributions of stands, charcoal samples, or vegetation changes seen over long periods of time. Examining past fire events and historic fire regimes provides a means of examining trends in vegetation and fire-climate interactions over a long time frame. The variability and fire-climate-vegetation interactions of fire regimes are able to be examined in greater detail and over much longer time periods (thousands of years) rather than just decades as provided by examining historical fire records. Studies have found strong correlations between past climate and fire frequency and extent using these historical fire aging methods.

Although fire history data is useful for understanding past fire regimes, changes in fire management, climate, and vegetation do not allow the continuation of the same fire regimes into the future. Models that examine past fire-climate relationships are the best predictors of future fire regime changes.

== Effects of an altered fire regime ==
Biota that are able to survive and adapt to their particular fire regimes can receive significant benefits: the ability to regrow stronger, greater protection against fire and disease, or new space to grow in formerly occupied locations. As a fire regime changes, species may begin to suffer. Decreasing fire intervals negatively affect the ability of fire-killed species to recover to pre-disturbance levels, leading to longer recovery times. Some species, such as resprouters, are better able to withstand changing fire regimes compared to obligate seeders. However, many fire-killed species may be unable to recover if shortened fire intervals persist over time. Lengthened fire intervals will negatively affect fire-adapted species, some of which depend upon fire for reproduction. In fire-adapted plant communities with stand-replacing crown fires, recruitment occurs in the first year following a fire event.

=== Climate change ===
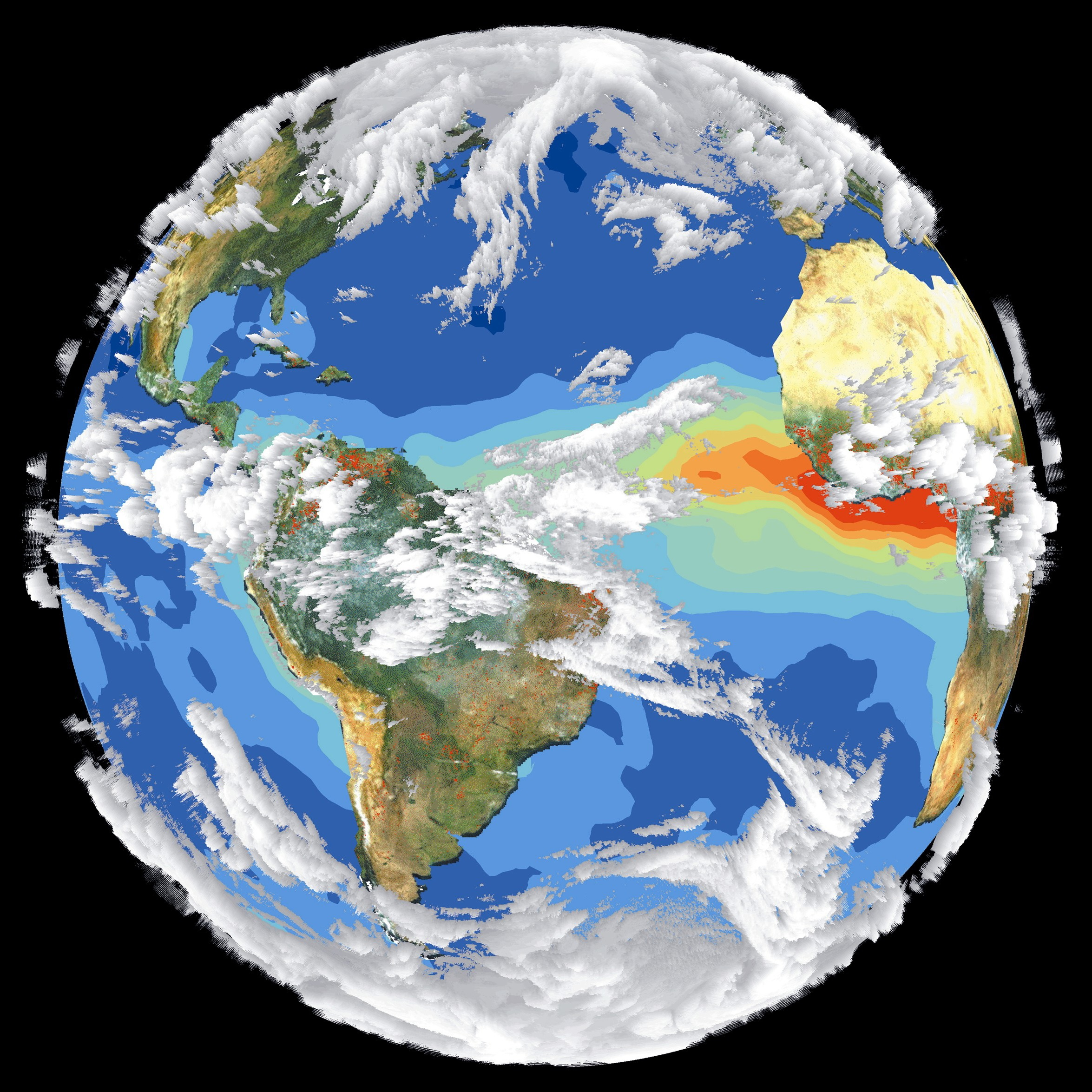
NASA imagery showing the interrelatedness of climate and fire. Active fires are represented by red dots.

Climate change has affected fire regimes globally, with models projecting higher fire frequencies and reduced plant growth as a result of warmer, drier climates. This is predicted to affect fire-intolerant woody species in particular by reducing plant recruitment, growth, and survival, which shortens the fire intervals within these landscapes causing plant extirpation or extinction. A recent model identifying the impacts of climate change and altered fire regimes and plant communities predicts that woody plant extinctions will increase, causing changes in ecosystem structure, composition, and carbon storage. The fire-climate interactions of a changing climate are predicted to reduce population recovery for plants solely dependent on seed production for re-population. As climates shift to warmer and drier, seedling recruitment may become poor or non-existent. This post-fire recruitment shift means that a decrease in precipitation causes an increase in dry or drought-prone years which causes a decrease in seed recruitment probability. This reduced seed recruitment also is exacerbated by increased fire severity.

Warmer climates are projected to increase fire activity and lengthen fire seasons globally. The annual number of extreme fire weather days is projected to increase as increasing temperatures, reduced relative humidity, increased wind speeds, and increased dry fuel loads result in higher fire intensities and severity. These changes will shorten fire intervals, which will reduce the time for plants to accumulate seeds and potentially allowing for selection of more flammable species. The result of these fire interval shifts have been studied globally. A study in southeast Australia found that widespread losses of mountain ash following prolonged wildfire seasons have burned 87% of the species range. Subsequent re-burns of immature mountain ash led to complete regeneration failure and conversion of forest cover to shrubs and grasslands. These patterns have also been seen in the Mediterranean forests of western North America chaparral regions. These climatic shifts in conjunction with increased fire frequency and shorter fire intervals are causing vegetative communities to shift their rates of growth, reproduction, and reduce post-disturbance recruitment rates.

== Examples ==
Bushfire is especially important in Australia, where much of the vegetation has evolved in the presence of regular fires caused by the Aboriginal practice of firestick farming. As result, components of the vegetation are adapted to and dependent upon a particular fire regime. Disruption of that fire regime can affect their survival. An example of fire regime dependent species is the Banksia species which is both fire-sensitive and serotinous. In Banksia species, fire also triggers the release of seed, ensuring population recovery. In an ideal fire regime, a plant would need to have sufficient time to mature and build an adequately large bank of seed before the next fire kills it and triggers seed release.

The California chaparral and woodlands ecoregion, covering a large portion of the U.S. state, is dependent on periodic natural wildfires for optimal health and renewal.^{[3]} A study showed that the increasing rural-urban fringe interface and wildfire suppression practices of the last century have resulted in an increased vulnerability to less frequent, more severe wildfires. The study claimed fire suppression increased fuel in coniferous forests. ^{[4]} Upon analysis of California Statewide Fire History Database from 1910–1999, it was actually found that fire frequency and the area burned have not declined, furthermore, fire size has not increased. Chaparral fire suppression, unlike fire suppression in coniferous forests, has not affected the natural fire regime, according to a study conducted by the United States Geological Survey.

== Invasive species effects ==
=== Cheatgrass ===
One example of an invasive species that changed fire regime in Western North America is Bromus tectorum. Historical fire return intervals in the Snake River Plain sagebrush was 60–110 years, but currently, due to the presence of cheat grass, it burns every 5 years. The cheat grass is a continuous source of fuel thus changing the fuel characteristics of the ecosystem. Frequent fire makes it difficult to impossible for native vegetation to fully recover.

=== Brazilian pepper tree ===
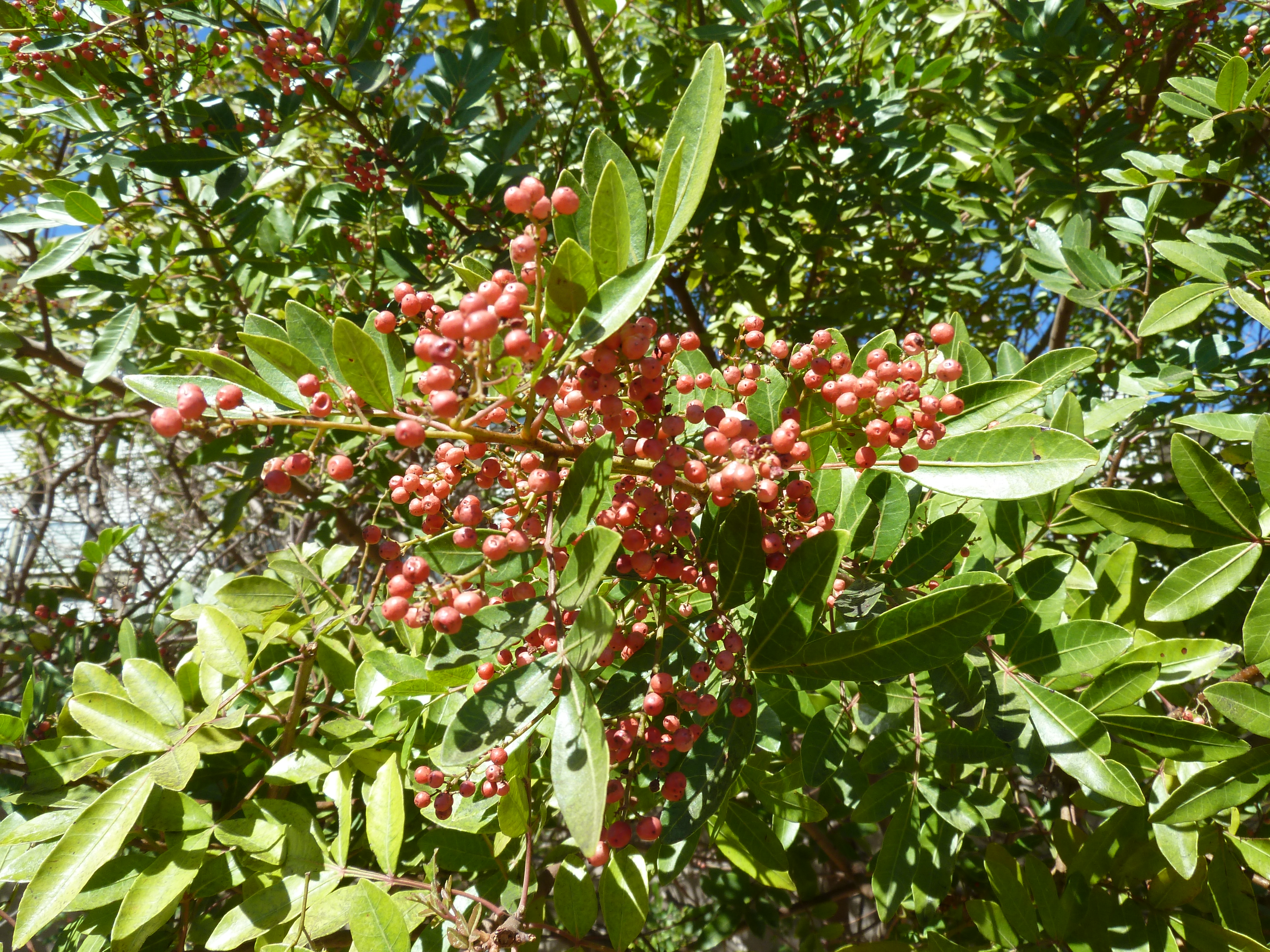
Brazilian pepper trees are encroaching on native plant communities throughout the southeastern U.S. and causing changes to the frequency and severity of fire regimes and ecosystems.

Another example of invasive species affecting fire regimes can be found with the spread of the Brazilian pepper tree (Schinus terebinthifolia) on native plant communities. Native to Brazil, Argentina, and Paraguay, the plant was introduced as an ornamental species and has now established itself in areas well outside of its native range. Populations exist in Australia, South Africa, the Mediterranean, southern Asia, and the southeastern United States. Brazilian pepper is often found in disturbed soils and substrates and often outcompetes native plant communities creating monoculture-like conditions. South Florida near the Everglades National Park has particularly been affected by its spread, with some studies reporting only 7 species within (6) 100 m^{2} plots. As Brazilian pepper moves into an area, it creates a sub-canopy layer that often outcompetes grasses and ground cover species. This changes the vegetative cover and densities of the landscape contributing a changed fire regime.

Brazilian peppers are fire-adapted and produce rapidly growing sprouts following fire events, although plant size and stand density are important in determining the post-fire response, with younger plants having higher mortality rates. Fire frequency plays some role in Brazilian pepper establishment, with areas of frequent fires displaying lower abundances of the plant in contrast to areas not regularly burned. A recent model found that a 4-year fire-return interval would eradicate an initial 100 pepper female population within 25 years. In areas where Brazilian pepper occurs, fire regimes have been altered greatly due to fire exclusion and human settlement. Historically, these areas experienced frequent, low-severity fires. Brazilian pepper may create a shaded humid understory and reduce fine fuel loads in areas of historically frequent fire, which therefore increases the fire-return interval thus negatively affecting the fire-adapted plant community.

== See also ==
- Chaparral
- Disturbance (ecology)
- Fire ecology
- Pyrogeography
