= Persoonia manotricha =

Scientific classification
- Kingdom: Plantae
- Clade: Tracheophytes
- Clade: Angiosperms
- Clade: Eudicots
- Order: Proteales
- Family: Proteaceae
- Genus: Persoonia
- Species: P. manotricha

Binomial name
- Persoonia manotricha A.S.Markey & R.Butcher

Species of flowering plant

Persoonia manotricha is a species of flowering plant in the family Proteaceae and is endemic to Western Australia. It is an erect shrub with hairy young branchlets, more or less cylindrical leaves and greenish yellow flowers in groups of up two to eight on a rachis 2–15 mm (0.079–0.591 in) long. It is similar to P. bowgada and P. hexagona but has longer pedicels than P. bowgada and differently grooved leaves from P. hexagona.

== Description ==
Persoonia manotricha is an erect shrub that typically grows to a height of 1–4 m (3 ft 3 in – 13 ft 1 in) and has smooth, mottled greyish bark usually fissured near the base, and branchlets that are hairy when young. The leaves are arranged alternately, more or less cylindrical but with six narrow grooves and a sharply pointed tip, 34–94 mm (1.3–3.7 in) long and 0.7–1.3 mm (0.028–0.051 in) wide. The leaf grooves are similar to those of P. bowgada but narrower than those of P. hexagona. The flowers are arranged in groups of two to eight on a rachis 2–15 mm (0.079–0.591 in) long, each flower on a densely hairy pedicel 4.2–17.4 mm (0.17–0.69 in) long and generally longer than those of P. bowgada. The tepals are greenish yellow, 12.5–19.5 mm (0.49–0.77 in) long, moderately hairy on the outside, the anthers yellow. Flowering has been observed in November and the fruit is a drupe about 17 mm (0.67 in) long and 6.6 mm (0.26 in) wide.

== Taxonomy and naming ==
Persoonia manotricha was first formally described in 2007 by Adrienne Markey and Ryonen Butcher in the journal Nuytsia from specimens collected by Lyndley Craven near Pindar in 1981. The specific epithet (manotricha) is from Greek words meaning "scanty" or "thin" and "hair", referring to the sparse hairs on the ovary.

== Distribution and habitat ==
This geebung mostly grows on rocky hills between Pindar and near Payne's Find in the Avon Wheatbelt, Geraldton Sandplains, Murchison and Yalgoo biogeographic regions of Western Australia.
