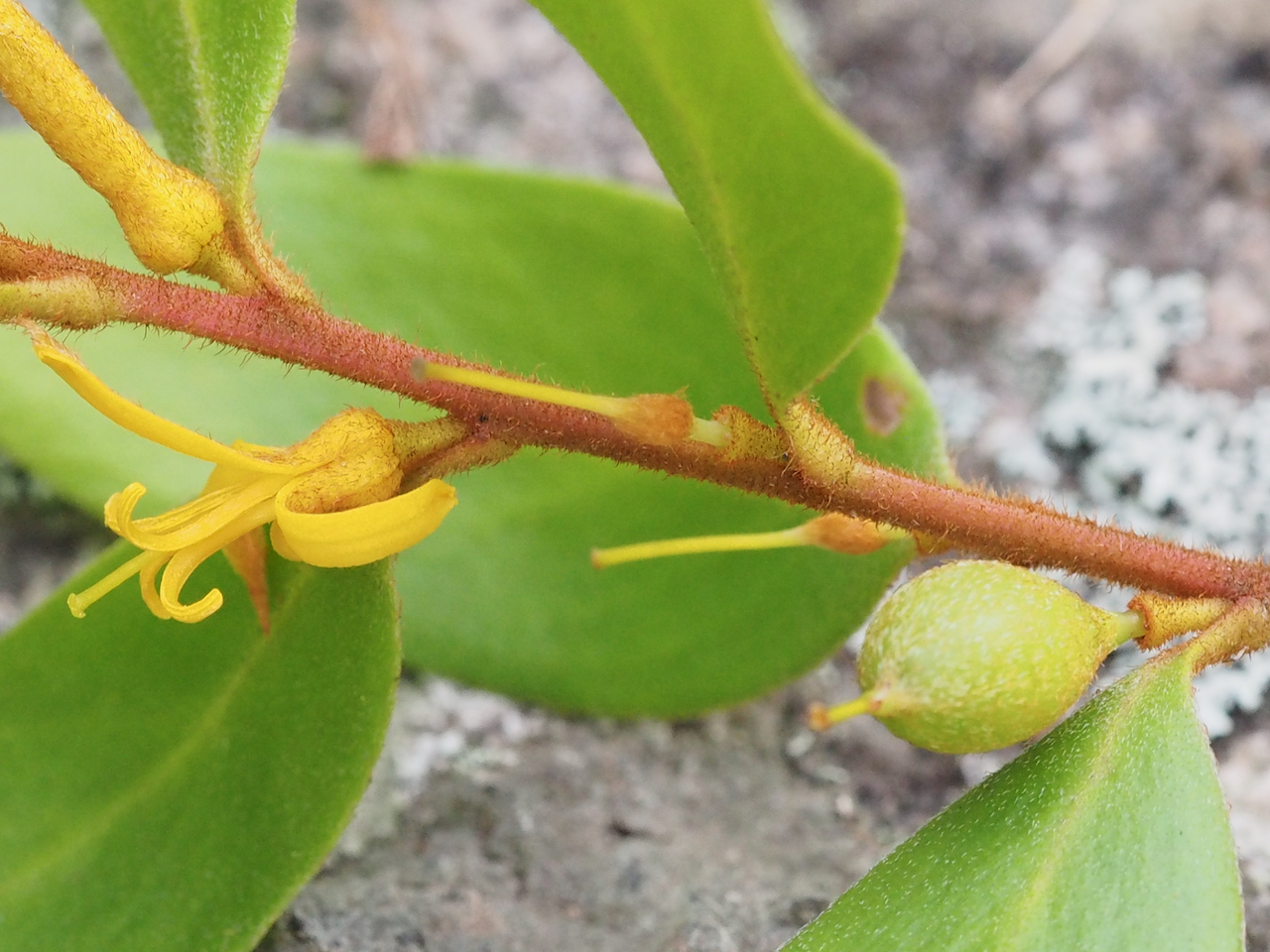

Scientific classification
- Kingdom: Plantae
- Clade: Tracheophytes
- Clade: Angiosperms
- Clade: Eudicots
- Order: Proteales
- Family: Proteaceae
- Genus: Persoonia
- Species: P. rufa

Binomial name
- Persoonia rufa L.A.S.Johnson & P.H.Weston

= Persoonia rufa =

Species of flowering plant

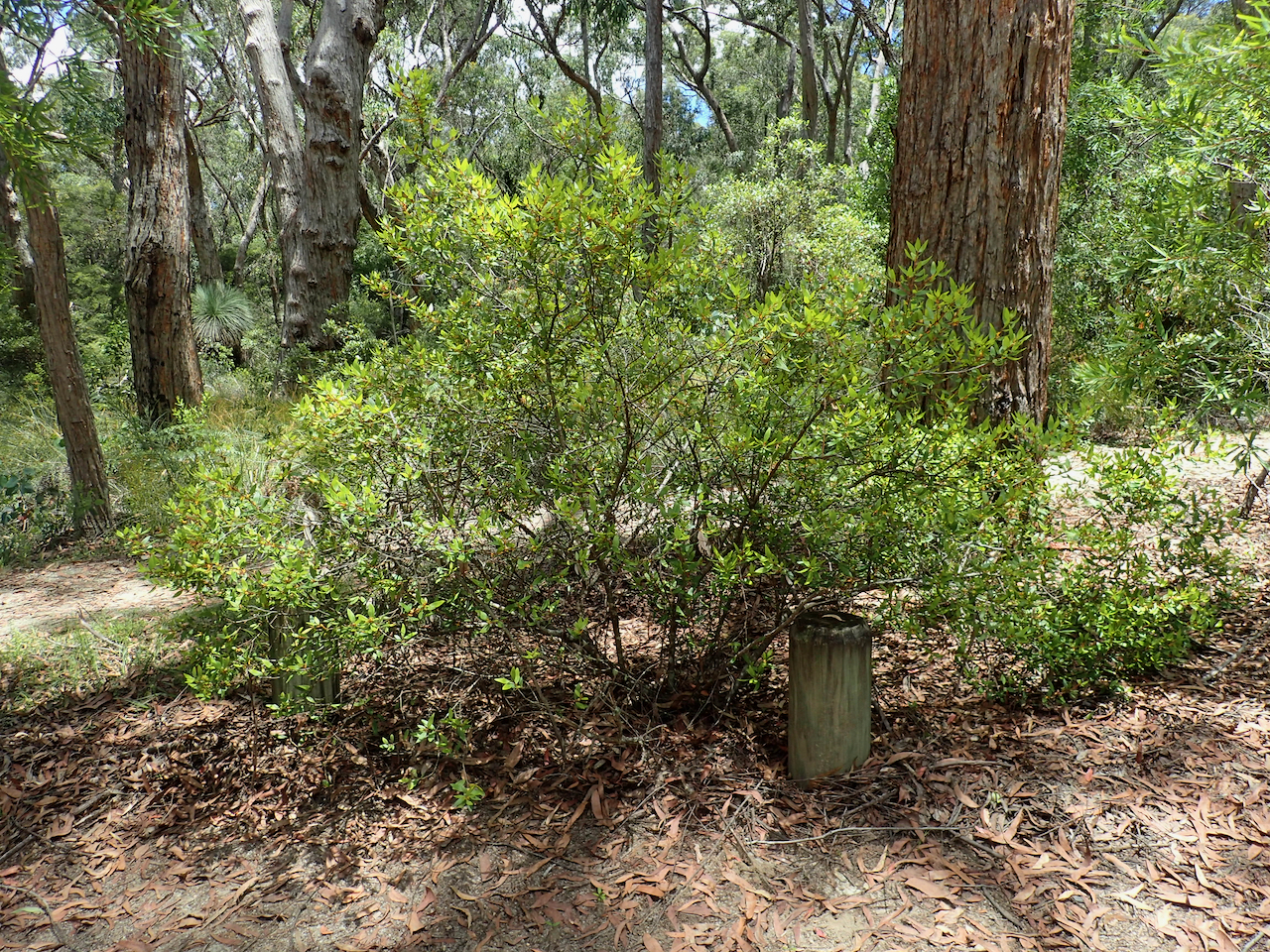
Habit in the Gibraltar Range National Park

Persoonia rufa is a species of flowering plant in the family Proteaceae and is endemic to the a restricted area of New South Wales. It is an erect to spreading shrub with hairy young branchlets, elliptic leaves, and yellow flowers borne in groups of up to twelve on a rachis up to 110 mm (4.3 in), each flower with a leaf at its base.

== Description ==
Persoonia rufa is an erect to spreading shrub that typically grows to a height of 1–2.5 m (3 ft 3 in – 8 ft 2 in) and has smooth bark, and branchlets that are covered with brownish to rust-coloured hairs when young. The leaves are elliptical, 30–80 mm (1.2–3.1 in) long and 10–25 mm (0.39–0.98 in) wide. The flowers are arranged in groups of up to twelve along a rachis up to 110 mm (4.3 in) long, each flower on a pedicel 1–3 mm (0.039–0.118 in) long with a leaf or scale leaf at its base. The tepals are yellow and 10–14 mm (0.39–0.55 in) long. Flowering occurs from December to February and the fruit is a drupe that is green or green with purple stripes.

== Taxonomy and naming ==
Persoonia rufa was first formally described in 1991 by Peter H. Weston and Lawrie Johnson from a specimen collected in the Gibraltar Range National Park in 1990 and the description was published in Telopea. The specific epithet (rufa) refers to the reddish hairs on the young branchlets.

== Distribution and habitat ==
This geebung is restricted to the Gibraltar Range National Park where it grows in eucalypt forest on soils derived from granite.
