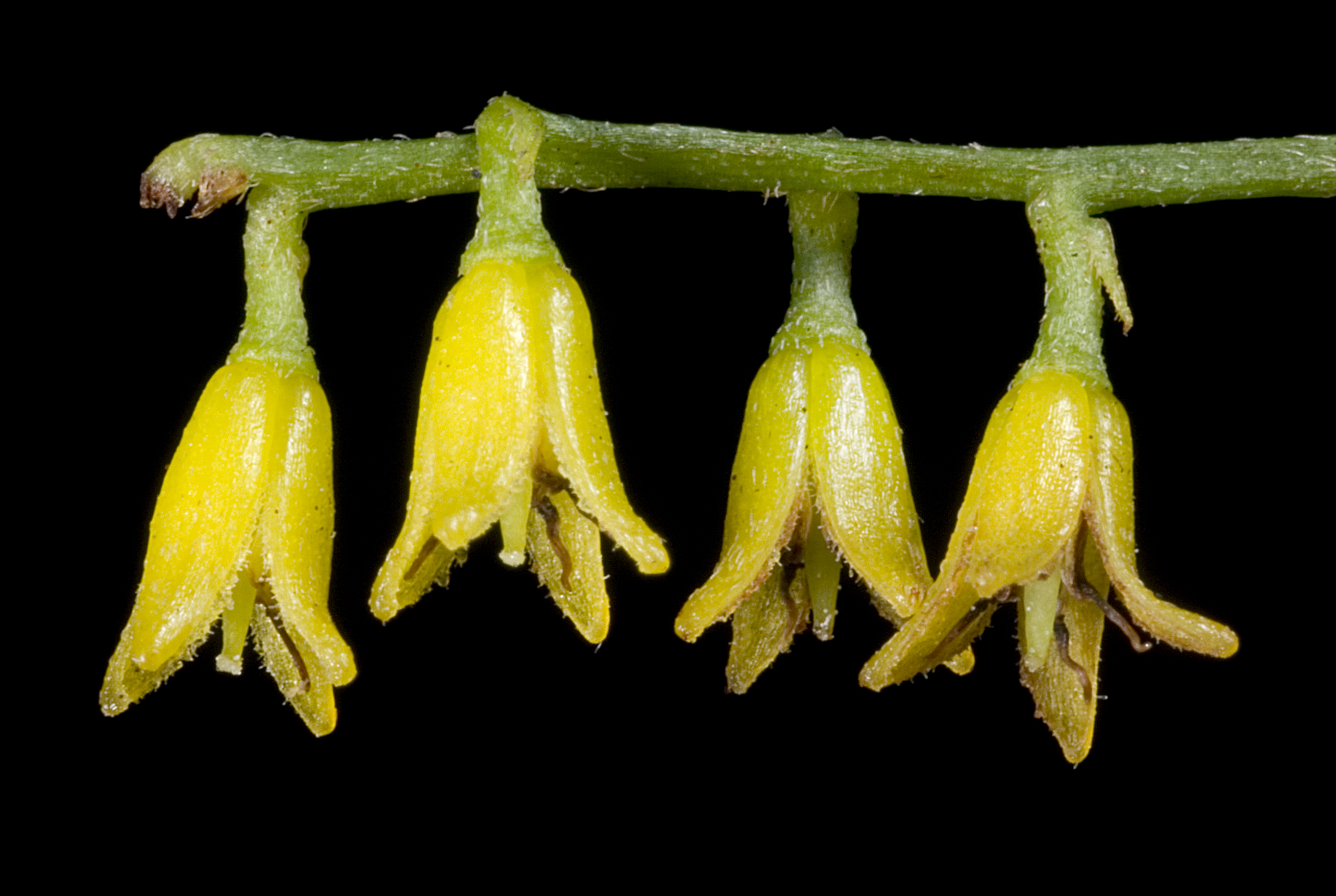

Scientific classification
- Kingdom: Plantae
- Clade: Tracheophytes
- Clade: Angiosperms
- Clade: Eudicots
- Order: Proteales
- Family: Proteaceae
- Genus: Persoonia
- Species: P. graminea

Binomial name
- Persoonia graminea R.Br.
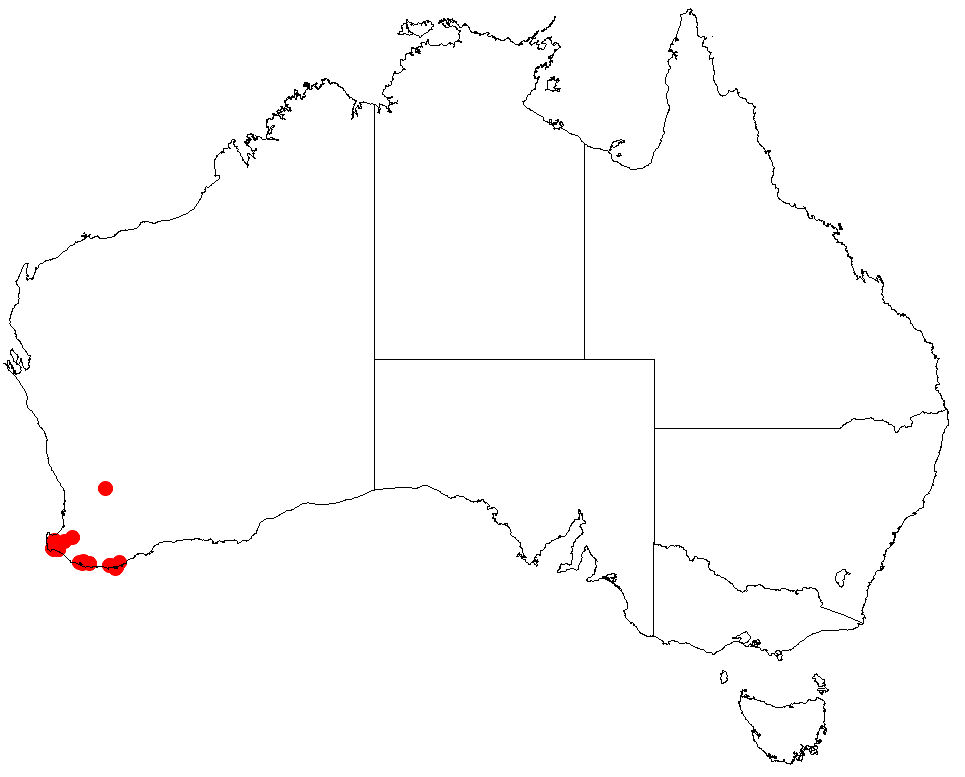
- Occurrence data from Australasian Virtual Herbarium

Synonyms
- Linkia graminea (R.Br.) Kuntze

= Persoonia graminea =

Species of flowering plant

Persoonia graminea is a species of flowering plant in the family Proteaceae and is endemic to the south-west of Western Australia. It is an erect to weak, low-lying shrub with long, linear leaves and flowers in groups of ten to twenty-five on a rachis up to 220 mm (8.7 in) long.

== Description ==
Persoonia graminea is an erect to weak, low-lying shrub that typically grows to a height of 20–60 cm (7.9–23.6 in), with its young branchlets covered with greyish hairs. The leaves are linear, 100–350 mm (3.9–13.8 in) long and 2–8 mm (0.079–0.315 in) wide, usually in small groups at the end of each year's growth. The flowers are arranged in groups of ten to twenty-five along a rachis up to 220 mm (8.7 in) long, each flower on a pedicel 2–6 mm (0.079–0.236 in) long. The tepals are egg-shaped to lance-shaped, bright yellow to green, 4.2–4.5 mm (0.17–0.18 in) long with bright yellow to green anthers. Flowering occurs from November to January and the fruit is a drupe 4.5–6 mm (0.18–0.24 in) long and 2–3 mm (0.079–0.118 in) wide containing a single seed.

== Taxonomy ==
Persoonia graminea was first formally described in 1810 by Robert Brown in Transactions of the Linnean Society of London from specimens he collected at King George Sound in December 1801.

== Distribution and habitat ==
This geebung is found on poorly-drained or loamy soils in swamps, heath, woodland and forest within 40 km (25 mi) of the coast between Margaret River and Albany.

== Conservation status ==
Persoonia graminea is classified as "not threatened" by the Western Australian Government Department of Parks and Wildlife.
