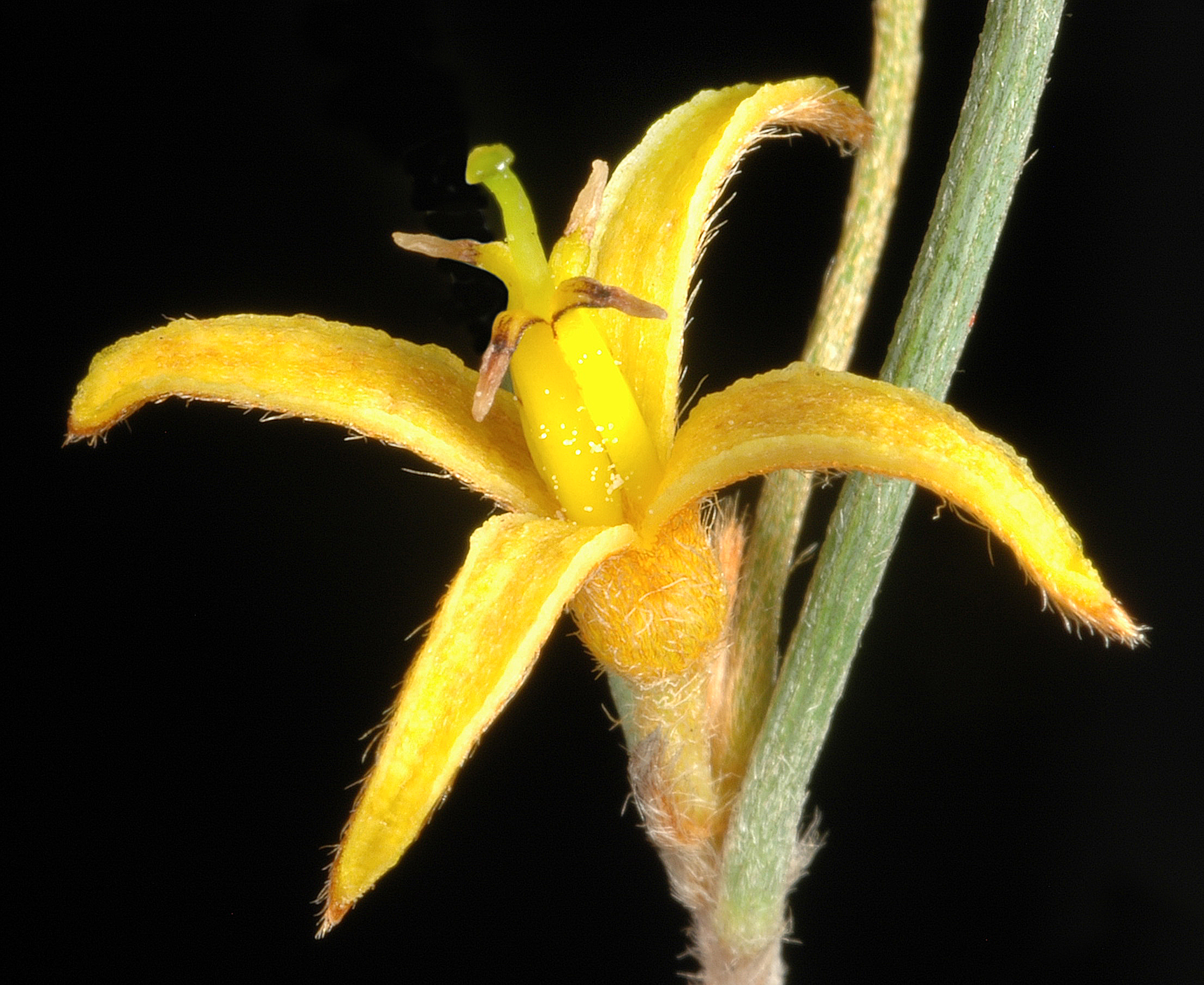
- Persoonia angustiflora

Scientific classification
- Kingdom: Plantae
- Clade: Tracheophytes
- Clade: Angiosperms
- Clade: Eudicots
- Order: Proteales
- Family: Proteaceae
- Genus: Persoonia
- Species: P. angustiflora

Binomial name
- Persoonia angustiflora Benth.
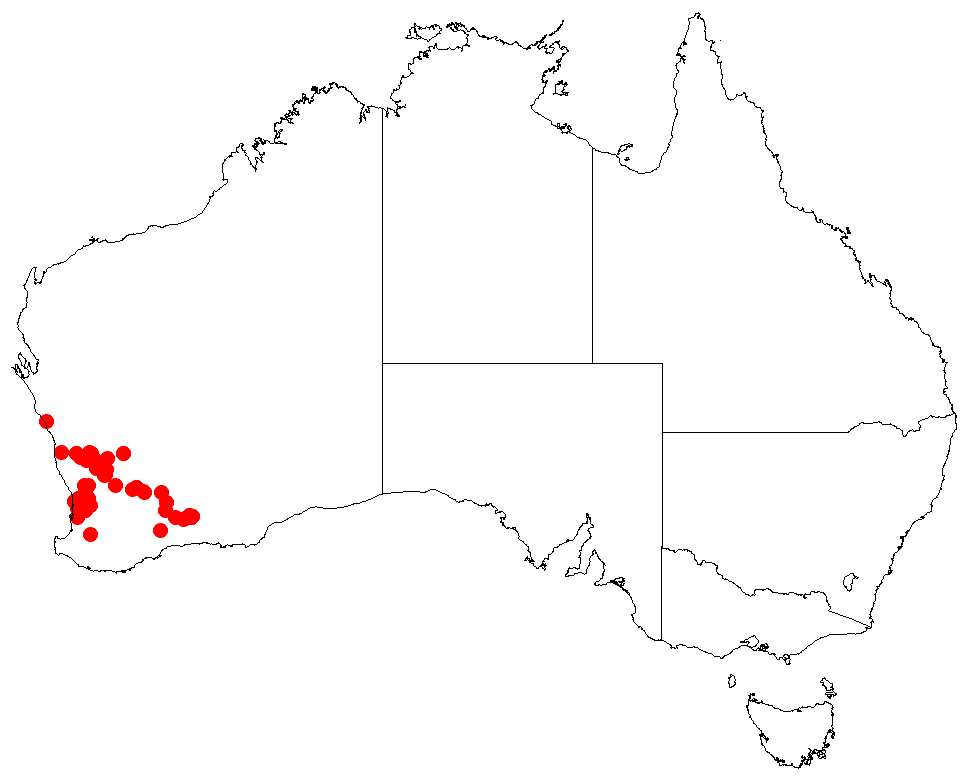
- Occurrence data from Australasian Virtual Herbarium

Synonyms
- Linkia angustiflora (Benth.) Kuntze; Persoonia angustiflora Benth. var. angustiflora; Persoonia angustiflora var. burracoppinensis D.A.Herb.; ? Persoonia angustiflora var. pedicellaris Benth.; Persoonia fraseri auct. non R.Br.: Meisner, C.D.F. in Lehmann, J.G.C. (ed.) (1845)

= Persoonia angustiflora =

Species of flowering plant

Persoonia angustiflora is a species of flowering plant in the family Proteaceae and is endemic to the south-west of Western Australia. It is an erect shrub with hairy branches and leaves, linear, more or less cylindrical leaves and yellow or greenish yellow flowers arranged singly or in groups of up to four.

== Description ==
Persoonia angustiflora is usually an erect, occasionally spreading, lignotuberous shrub that typically grows to a height of 0.2–1.8 m (7.9 in – 5 ft 10.9 in) with young branchlets and leaves covered with greyish to brown hairs. The leaves are linear, more or less cylindrical or slightly flattened with longitudinal grooves, 20–130 mm (0.79–5.12 in) long and 0.7–1.3 mm (0.028–0.051 in) wide but not sharply pointed. Yellow or greenish yellow flowers are borne singly or in groups of up to four, each flower on a pedicel 1.5–12 mm (0.059–0.472 in) long with tepals 9–16 mm (0.35–0.63 in) long and hairy on the outside. Flowering occurs from September to March.

== Taxonomy and naming ==
Persoonia angustiflora was first formally described in 1870 by George Bentham in Flora Australiensis from specimens collected by James Drummond near the Swan River.

== Distribution and habitat ==
This persoonia grows in heath mallee and woodland between Eneabba, Perth Frank Hann National Park and Maya in the south-west of Western Australia.

== Conservation status ==
Persoonia angustiflora is classified as "not threatened" by the Government of Western Australia Department of Parks and Wildlife.
