= Persoonia volcanica =

Scientific classification
- Kingdom: Plantae
- Clade: Tracheophytes
- Clade: Angiosperms
- Clade: Eudicots
- Order: Proteales
- Family: Proteaceae
- Genus: Persoonia
- Species: P. volcanica

Binomial name
- Persoonia volcanica P.H.Weston & L.A.S.Johnson

Species of flowering plant

Persoonia volcanica is a species of flowering plant in the family Proteaceae and is endemic to eastern Australia. It is an erect shrub with hairy young branchlets, egg-shaped to oblong leaves, and yellow flowers borne in groups of up to twenty on a rachis up to 180 mm (7.1 in) that usually continues to grow after flowering, each flower with a leaf at its base.

== Description ==
Persoonia volcanica is an erect shrub that typically grows to a height of 1.8–6 m (5 ft 11 in – 19 ft 8 in) and has smooth bark, and branchlets that are covered with greyish to rust-coloured hairs when young. The leaves are egg-shaped to elliptic or oblong, 20–90 mm (0.79–3.54 in) long and 3–10 mm (0.12–0.39 in) wide. The flowers are arranged in groups of up to twenty along a rachis up to 180 mm (7.1 in) long that continues to grow after flowering, each flower on a pedicel 1.5–10 mm (0.059–0.394 in) long, usually with a leaf at its base. The tepals are yellow and 9–13 mm (0.35–0.51 in) long. Flowering mainly occurs from December to February and the fruit is a green drupe.

== Taxonomy and naming ==
Persoonia volcanica was first formally described in 1991 by Peter H. Weston and Lawrie Johnson from a specimen collected near Woodenbong in 1989 and the description was published in Telopea. The specific epithet (volcanica) is a reference to the substrate on which this species usually grows.

== Distribution and habitat ==
This geebung grows in forest and the margins of rainforest on the McPherson Range on the New South Wales-Queensland border and disjunctly in Kroombit Tops National Park further north.
