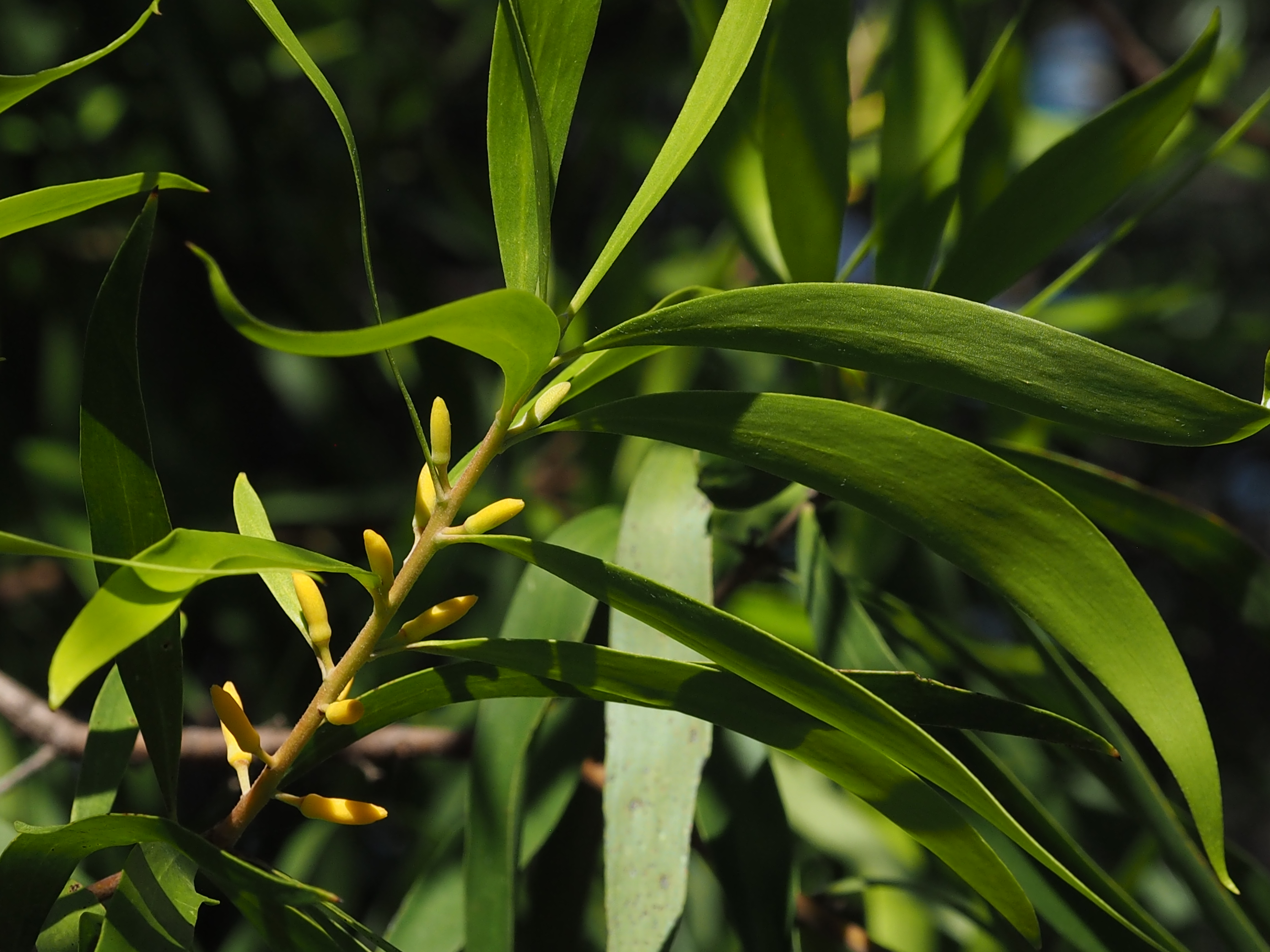

Scientific classification
- Kingdom: Plantae
- Clade: Tracheophytes
- Clade: Angiosperms
- Clade: Eudicots
- Order: Proteales
- Family: Proteaceae
- Genus: Persoonia
- Species: P. katerae

Binomial name
- Persoonia katerae P.H.Weston & L.A.S.Johnson

= Persoonia katerae =

Species of shrub

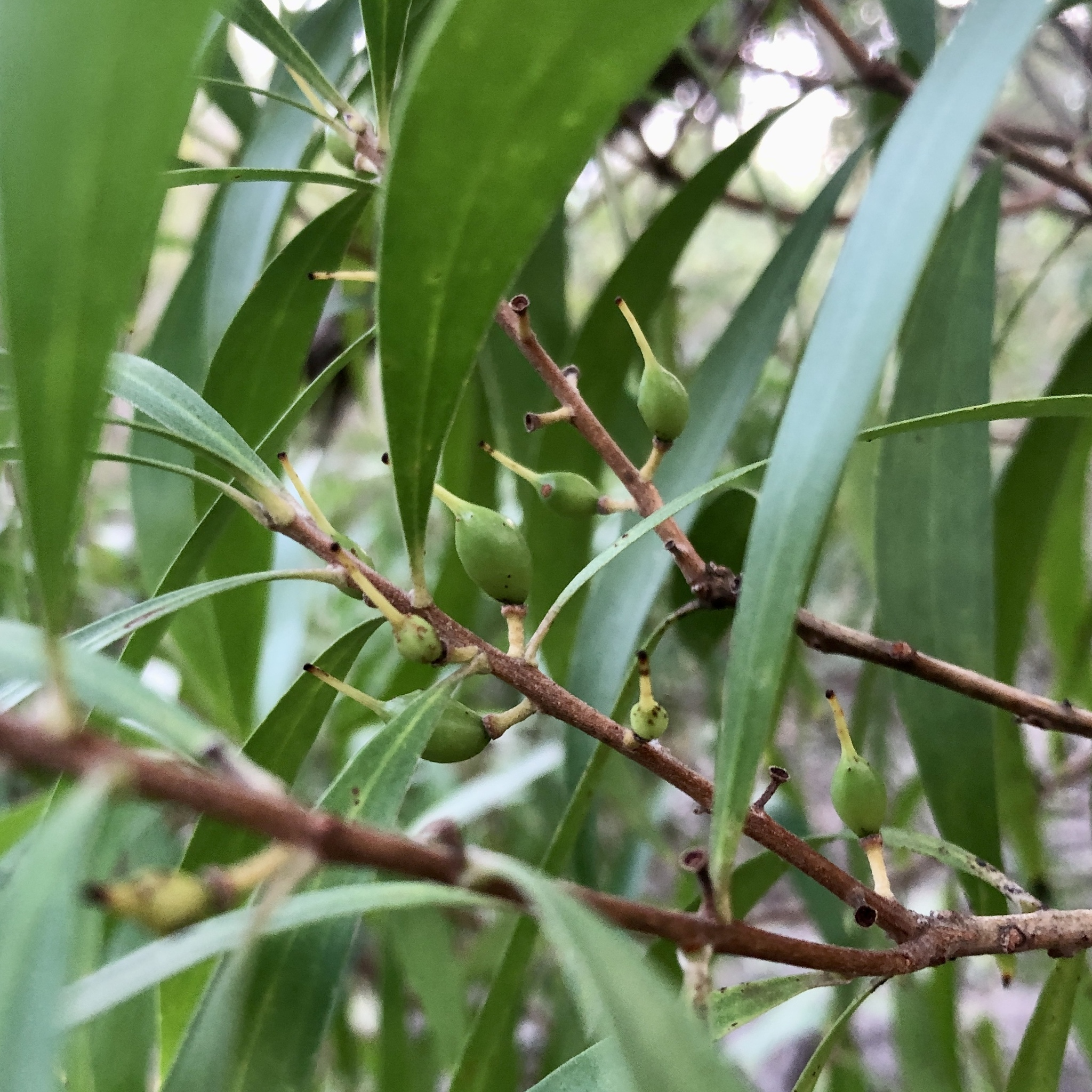
Immature fruit

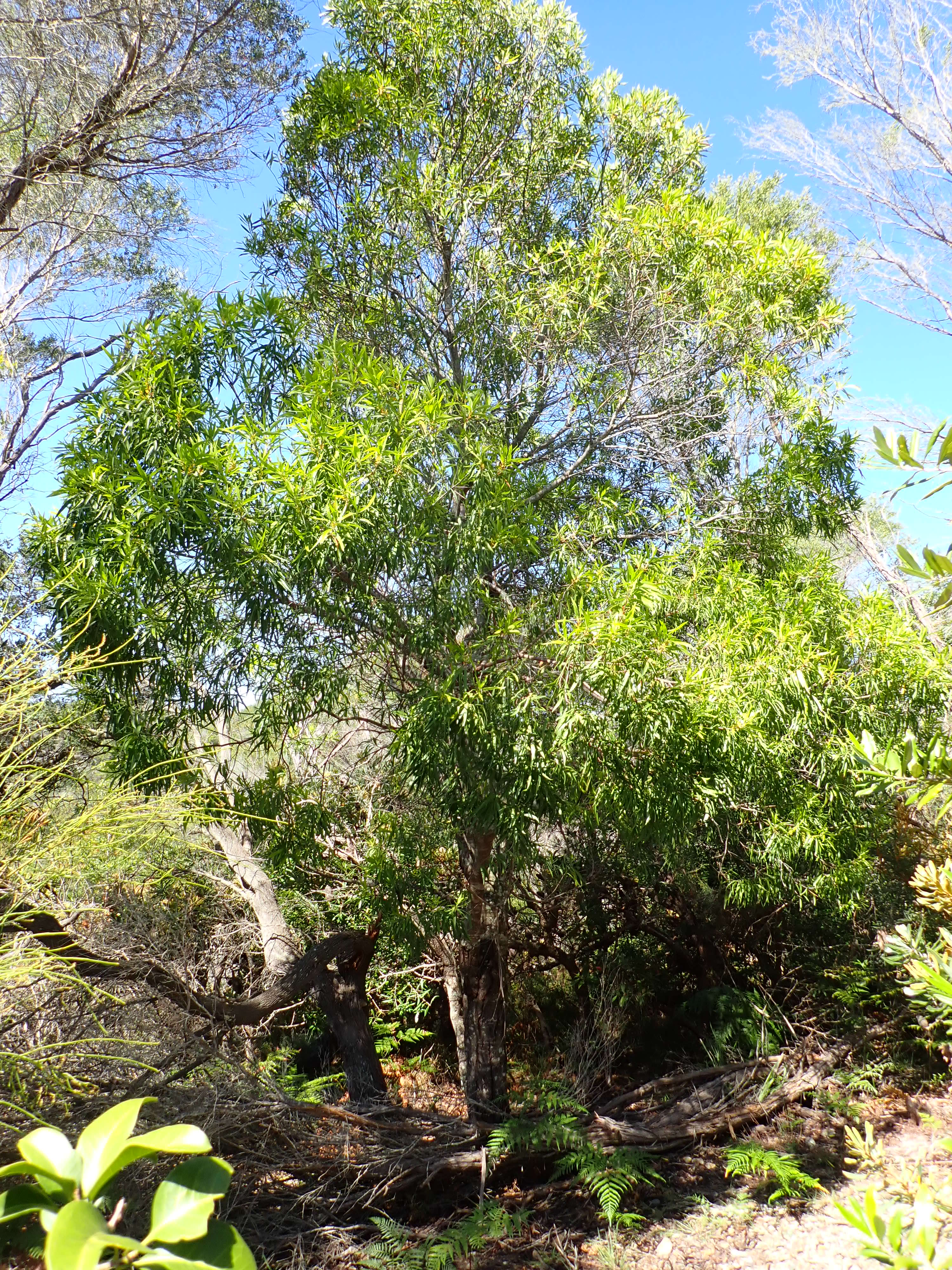
Habit

Persoonia katerae is a species of plant in the family Proteaceae that is endemic to a small area on the coast of New South Wales, Australia. It is an erect shrub to small tree with smooth bark on the branches, narrow elliptic to lance-shaped leaves with the narrower end towards the base, and yellow flowers in groups of six to twenty-two on a rachis 30–160 mm (1.2–6.3 in) long.

== Description ==
Persoonia katerae is an erect shrub to small tree that typically grows to a height of about 2.5–9 m (8 ft 2 in – 29 ft 6 in) and has finely fissured bark near the base, smooth bark above. Its young branchlets are covered with greyish hairs. The leaves are narrow elliptical to lance-shaped with the narrower end towards the base, 60–170 mm (2.4–6.7 in) long and 8–22 mm (0.31–0.87 in) wide, sometimes with a few hairs mainly on the edges. The flowers are arranged in groups of six to twenty-two along a rachis 30–160 mm (1.2–6.3 in) long that grows into a leafy shoot after flowering. Each flower is on a pedicel about 35 mm (1.4 in) long and the tepals are yellow, 9–12 mm (0.35–0.47 in) long and hairy on the outside. Flowering occurs from January to February and the fruit is a green drupe, sometimes suffused with purple.

== Taxonomy ==
Persoonia katerae was first formally described in 1991 by P.H.Weston & L.A.S.Johnson in the journal Telopea from specimens collected near Boomerang Beach in 1988.

== Distribution and habitat ==
This geebung grows in heath and forest on coastal sand between the Hastings River and Myall Lakes in coastal New South Wales.
