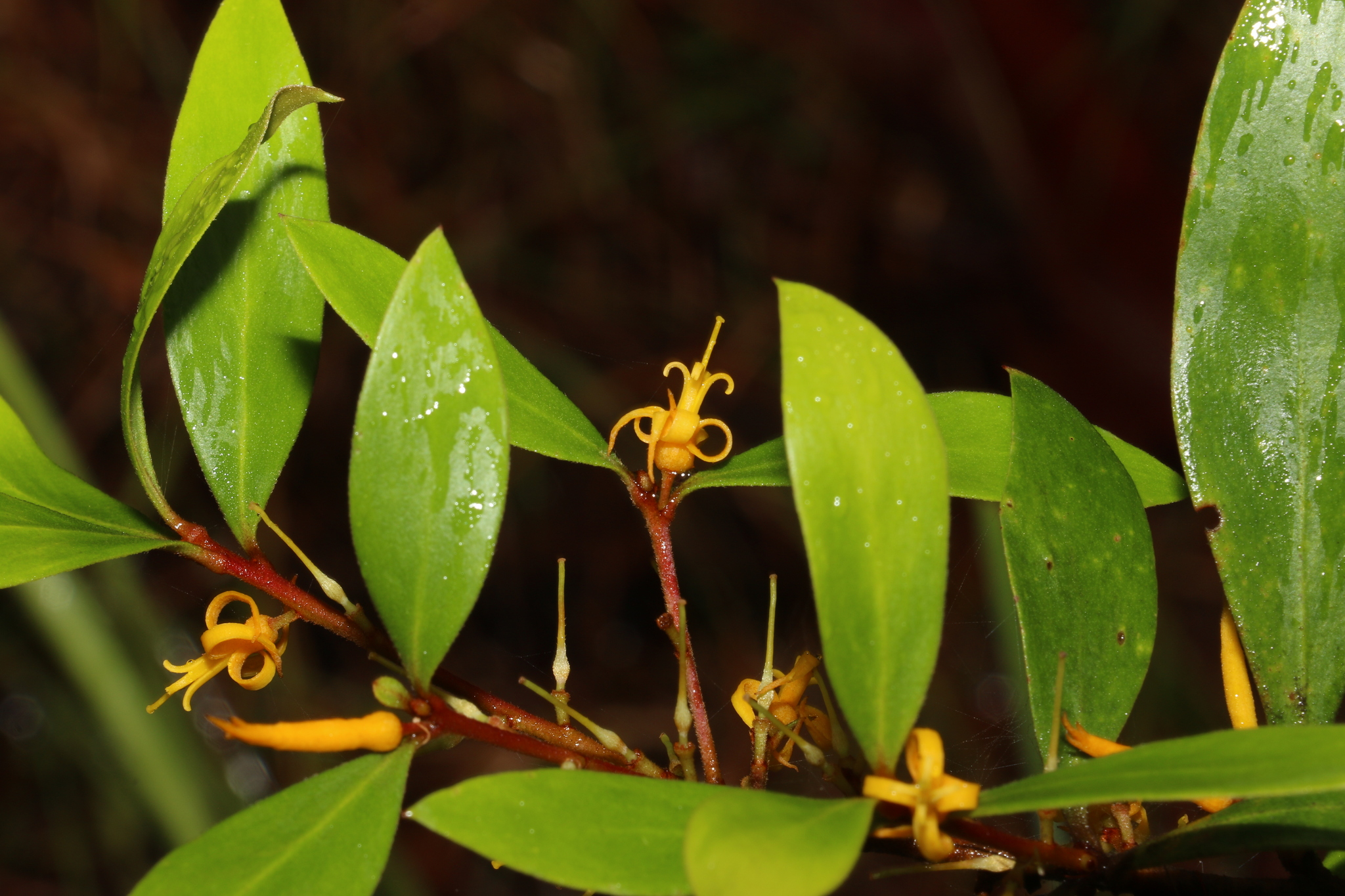

Scientific classification
- Kingdom: Plantae
- Clade: Tracheophytes
- Clade: Angiosperms
- Clade: Eudicots
- Order: Proteales
- Family: Proteaceae
- Genus: Persoonia
- Species: P. iogyna

Binomial name
- Persoonia iogyna P.H.Weston & L.A.S.Johnson
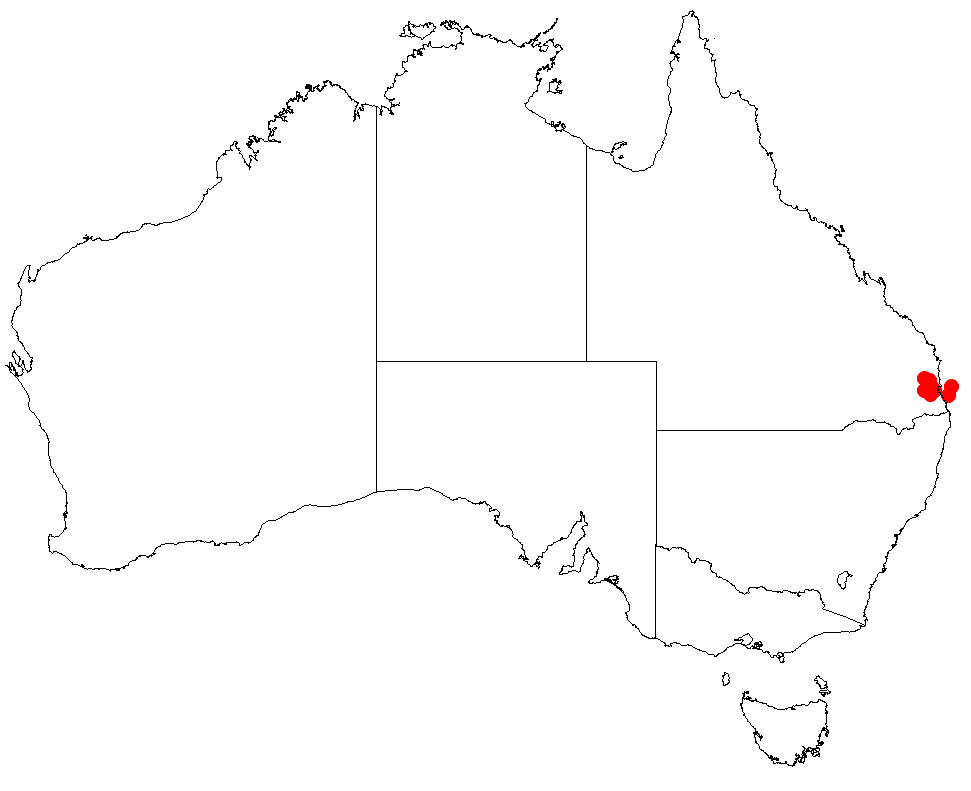
- Occurrence data from Australasian Virtual Herbarium

= Persoonia iogyna =

Species of flowering plant

Persoonia iogyna is a species of flowering plant in the family Proteaceae. It is endemic to south-eastern Queensland, Australia. It is an erect shrub or small tree with hairy young branchlets, narrow elliptical to lance-shaped leaves, yellow flowers and green fruit.

== Description ==
Persoonia iogyna is an erect shrub or small tree that typically grows to a height of 1.6–4 m (5 ft 3 in – 13 ft 1 in) with smooth bark and hairy young branchlets. The leaves are arranged alternately along the stems, narrow elliptical to lance-shaped, 25–110 mm (0.98–4.33 in) long and 6–19 mm (0.24–0.75 in) wide with the edges curved downwards. The flowers are arranged in groups of up to eleven, each flower on a pedicel 2–5 mm (0.079–0.197 in) long. The tepals are yellow and 10–13 mm (0.39–0.51 in) long. Flowering occurs from December to February and the fruit is a green drupe about 9 mm (0.35 in) long and 4.5 mm (0.18 in) wide.

== Taxonomy ==
Persoonia iogyna was first formally described in 1994 by Peter Weston and Lawrie Johnson from material collected near Mount Nebo in 1990.

== Distribution and habitat ==
This geebung grows in eucalypt forest at altitudes from 400 to 600 m (1,300 to 2,000 ft) in the Conondale and D'Aguilar Ranges in south-eastern Queensland.

== Conservation status ==
Persoonia iogyna is classified as of "least concern" under the Queensland Government Nature Conservation Act 1992.
