= Persoonia filiformis =

Conservation status
- Priority Three — Poorly Known Taxa (DEC)

Scientific classification
- Kingdom: Plantae
- Clade: Tracheophytes
- Clade: Angiosperms
- Clade: Eudicots
- Order: Proteales
- Family: Proteaceae
- Genus: Persoonia
- Species: P. filiformis

Binomial name
- Persoonia filiformis P.H.Weston
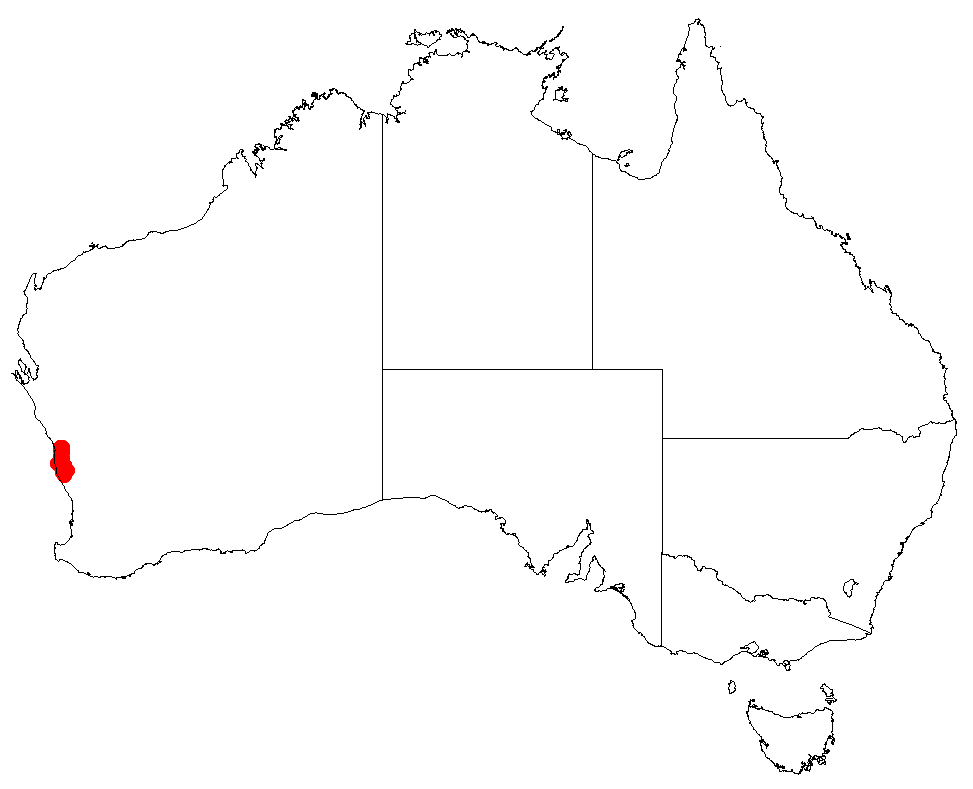
- Occurrence data from Australasian Virtual Herbarium

Species of flowering plant

Persoonia filiformis is a species of flowering plant in the family Proteaceae and is endemic to the south-west of Western Australia. It is a small, erect shrub with hairy young branchlets, linear leaves and greenish yellow flowers borne singly or in groups of up to twenty on a rachis up to 30 mm (1.2 in) long.

== Description ==
Persoonia filiformis is an erect shrub that typically grows to a height of 7–40 cm (2.8–15.7 in) with thin bark and branchlets that are hairy when young. The leaves are arranged alternately, linear in shape, 10–20 mm (0.39–0.79 in) long and about 1 mm (0.039 in) wide with six prominent, parallel veins and a sharp point on the tip. The flowers are arranged singly or in pairs or groups of up to twenty along a rachis up to 30 mm (1.2 in) long that grows into a leafy shoot after flowering, each flower on a glabrous pedicel 1–2 mm (0.039–0.079 in) long. The tepals are greenish yellow, 11–16 mm (0.43–0.63 in) long and glabrous on the outside with greenish yellow anthers that are fused to the tepals. Flowering occurs from November to December.

== Taxonomy ==
Persoonia filiformis was first formally described in 1994 by Peter Weston in the journal Telopea from specimens he collected near the turnoff to Jurien Bay from the Brand Highway in 1980.

== Distribution and habitat ==
This geebung grows in low heath between the Arrowsmith River and Badgingarra in the south-west of Western Australia.

== Conservation status ==
Persoonia filiformis is classified as "Priority Three" by the Government of Western Australia Department of Parks and Wildlife meaning that it is poorly known and known from only a few locations but is not under imminent threat.
