= Persoonia leucopogon =

Conservation status
- Priority One — Poorly Known Taxa (DEC)

Scientific classification
- Kingdom: Plantae
- Clade: Tracheophytes
- Clade: Angiosperms
- Clade: Eudicots
- Order: Proteales
- Family: Proteaceae
- Genus: Persoonia
- Species: P. leucopogon

Binomial name
- Persoonia leucopogon S.Moore

Species of flowering plant

Persoonia leucopogon is a species of flowering plant in the family Proteaceae and is endemic to Western Australia. It is an erect to low-lying shrub with branchlets that are densely hairy when young, narrow oblong to narrow elliptic leaves and yellow or greenish yellow flowers borne singly or in groups of up to four on a rachis up to 2 mm (0.079 in) long.

== Description ==
Persoonia leucopogon is an erect to low-lying shrub that typically grows to a height of 30–60 cm (12–24 in) with branchlets that are densely covered with greyish to rust-coloured hairs when young. The leaves are arranged alternately, narrow oblong to narrow elliptical, 7–15 mm (0.28–0.59 in) long and 1.3–2.2 mm (0.051–0.087 in) wide and twisted through 360°. The flowers are arranged singly or in groups of up to four along a rachis up to 2 mm (0.079 in) long that grows into a leafy shoot after flowering, each flower on a pedicel 2.5–4 mm (0.098–0.157 in) long. The tepals are yellow to greenish yellow, densely hairy on the outside, 8.5–10.5 mm (0.33–0.41 in) long with yellow anthers. Flowering occurs from November to March and the fruit is a smooth, more or less spherical drupe.

== Taxonomy ==
Persoonia leucopogon was first formally described in 1899 by Spencer Le Marchant Moore in the Journal of the Linnean Society, Botany.

== Distribution and habitat ==
This geebung usually grows in grows in heath but has only been collected at Bungalbin and at the type locality between Coolgardie and Laverton in the Avon Wheatbelt, Coolgardie and Murchison biogeographic regions.

== Conservation status ==
This species is classified as "Priority One" by the Government of Western Australia Department of Parks and Wildlife, meaning that it is known from only one or a few locations which are potentially at risk.
