= Persoonia brevifolia =

Scientific classification
- Kingdom: Plantae
- Clade: Tracheophytes
- Clade: Angiosperms
- Clade: Eudicots
- Order: Proteales
- Family: Proteaceae
- Genus: Persoonia
- Species: P. brevifolia

Binomial name
- Persoonia brevifolia (Benth.) L.A.S.Johnson & P.H.Weston
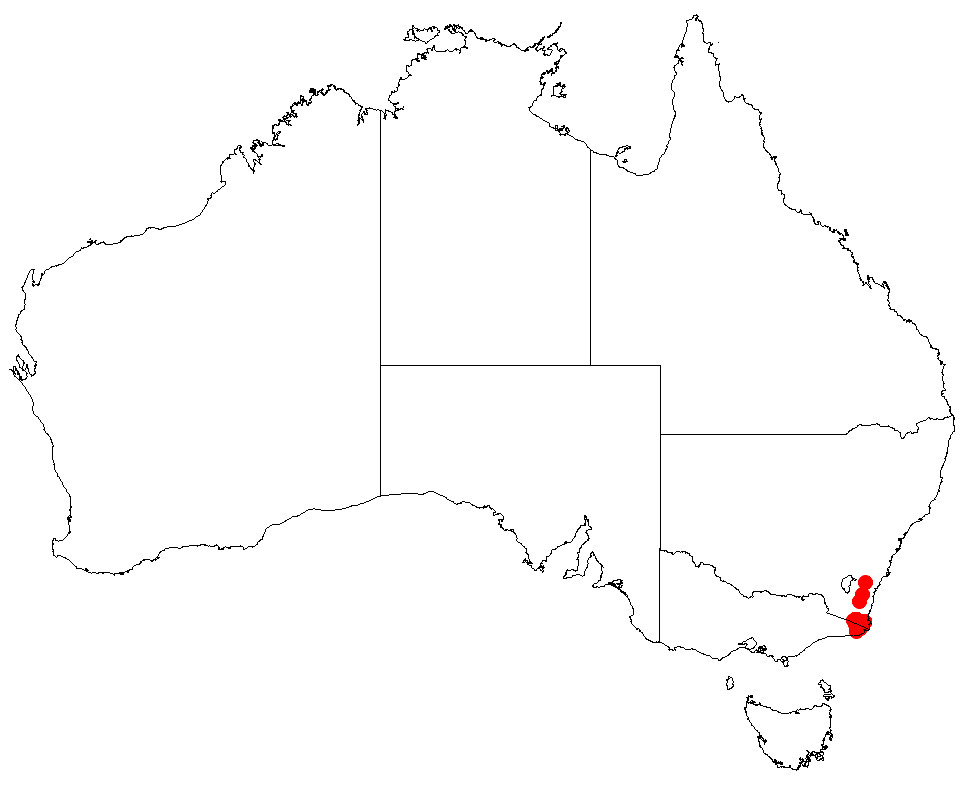
- Occurrence data downloaded from AVH

Synonyms
- Persoonia myrtilloides var. brevifolia Benth.; Persoonia sp. C (aff. myrtilloides)

Species of flowering plant

Persoonia brevifolia is a plant in the family Proteaceae and is endemic to a restricted area near the border between south-eastern New South Wales and Victoria. It is an erect shrub with elliptic to egg-shaped leaves and cylindrical yellow flowers arranged singly in leaf axils.

== Description ==
Persoonia brevifolia is an erect shrub growing to a height of 0.8–1.5 m (2 ft 7 in – 4 ft 11 in) and has smooth bark and moderately hairy young branches. The leaves are elliptic to egg-shaped 10–25 mm (0.39–0.98 in) long, 3–12 mm (0.12–0.47 in) wide and sparsely hairy when young but become glabrous as they age. The upper surface is distinctly darker than the lower surface. The flowers are yellow and arranged singly in leaf axils, each flower on a pedicel 2–5 mm (0.079–0.197 in) long. The four tepals are 5–12 mm (0.2–0.5 in) long. Flowering occurs from December to March the fruit is an oval drupe.

== Taxonomy ==
This geebung was first formally described in 1870 by George Bentham and given the name Persoonia myrtilloides var. brevifolia in Flora Australiensis, from specimens collected by Ferdinand von Mueller at "Upper Genoa River and Nangatta Mountains up to 4,000 ft (1,200 m) elevation". In 1991, Lawrie Johnson and Peter Weston raised the variety to species status as Persoonia brevifolia in the journal Telopea.

== Distribution and habitat ==
This geebung grows in eucalypt forest at altitudes between 200 and 1,100 m (660 and 3,610 ft) on a few peaks near the New South Wales–Victoria border and near the upper Genoa River in far eastern Victoria.
