= Persoonia biglandulosa =

Scientific classification
- Kingdom: Plantae
- Clade: Tracheophytes
- Clade: Angiosperms
- Clade: Eudicots
- Order: Proteales
- Family: Proteaceae
- Genus: Persoonia
- Species: P. biglandulosa

Binomial name
- Persoonia biglandulosa P.H.Weston

Species of flowering plant

Persoonia biglandulosa is a species of flowering plant in the family Proteaceae and is endemic to the south-west of Western Australia. It is an erect, spreading or low-lying shrub with smooth bark, linear leaves and bright yellow flowers in groups of between eight and twenty-five on the ends of branches.

== Description ==
Persoonia biglandulosa is an erect, spreading or low-lying shrub that typically grows to a height of 0.15–1.5 m (5.9 in – 4 ft 11.1 in) and has smooth, mottled grey bark. The leaves are cylindrical but with a groove along the lower surface, 50–100 mm (2.0–3.9 in) long and 1.0–1.3 mm (0.039–0.051 in) wide. The flowers are arranged in groups of between eight and twenty-five on or near the ends of branchlets that continue to grow after flowering, each flower on a hairy pedicel 6–10 mm (0.24–0.39 in) long. The tepals are bright yellow, 10–13 mm (0.39–0.51 in) long and moderately hairy, the anthers white. Flowering occurs from October to December and the fruit is a smooth oval drupe, 11–14 mm (0.43–0.55 in) long and 6–6.5 mm (0.24–0.26 in) wide containing a single seed.

== Taxonomy ==
Persoonia biglandulosa was first formally described in 1994 by Peter Weston in the journal Telopea from specimens he collected north of the Murchison River in 1980.

== Distribution and habitat ==
This geebung grows in low heath on sandplains within 60 km (37 mi) of the Murchison River in the south-west of Western Australia.

== Conservation status ==
Persoonia biglandulosa is classified as "not threatened" by the Western Australian Government Department of Parks and Wildlife.
