= Persoonia tropica =

Scientific classification
- Kingdom: Plantae
- Clade: Tracheophytes
- Clade: Angiosperms
- Clade: Eudicots
- Order: Proteales
- Family: Proteaceae
- Genus: Persoonia
- Species: P. tropica

Binomial name
- Persoonia tropica P.H.Weston & L.A.S.Johnson

Species of shrub

Persoonia tropica is a plant in the family Proteaceae and is endemic to north Queensland. It is an erect shrub to small tree shrub with branchlets that are hairy when young, narrow elliptic to lance-shaped leaves and yellow flowers in groups of three to ten on a rachis 3–10 mm (0.12–0.39 in) long that continues to grow after flowering.

== Description ==
Persoonia tropica is an erect shrub to tree that typically grows to a height of 2–3.5 m (6 ft 7 in – 11 ft 6 in) with smooth grey bark and young branchlets covered with greyish to brownish hairs. The leaves are narrow elliptic to lance-shaped with the narrower end towards the base, 45–110 mm (1.8–4.3 in) long, 7–21 mm (0.28–0.83 in) wide and hairy at first but more or less glabrous with age. The flowers are arranged in groups of three to ten along a rachis 3–10 mm (0.12–0.39 in) long that continues to grow after flowering, each flower on a hairy pedicel 0.5–2 mm (0.020–0.079 in) long with a leaf or scale leaf at its base. The tepals are yellow, 9–11 mm (0.35–0.43 in) long and sparsely hairy. Flowering occurs throughout the year but more in spring and the fruit is a green to pale yellow drupe 9–11 mm (0.35–0.43 in) long and 5.5–6 mm (0.22–0.24 in) long.

== Taxonomy ==
Persoonia tropica was first formally described in 1994 by Peter Weston and Lawrie Johnson in the journal Telopea from specimens collected in 1991 near Koombooloomba Dam.

== Distribution and habitat ==
This geebung grows in forest at altitudes from 700 to 1,200 m (2,300 to 3,900 ft) on the Herberton Range, near Ravenshoe and the catchment of the upper Tully River in north Queensland.

== Conservation status ==
Persoonia tropica is listed as of "least concern" under the Queensland Government Nature Conservation Act 1992.
