= Persoonia dillwynioides =

Fitzgerald persoonia

Scientific classification
- Kingdom: Plantae
- Clade: Tracheophytes
- Clade: Angiosperms
- Clade: Eudicots
- Order: Proteales
- Family: Proteaceae
- Genus: Persoonia
- Species: P. dillwynioides

Binomial name
- Persoonia dillwynioides Meisn.
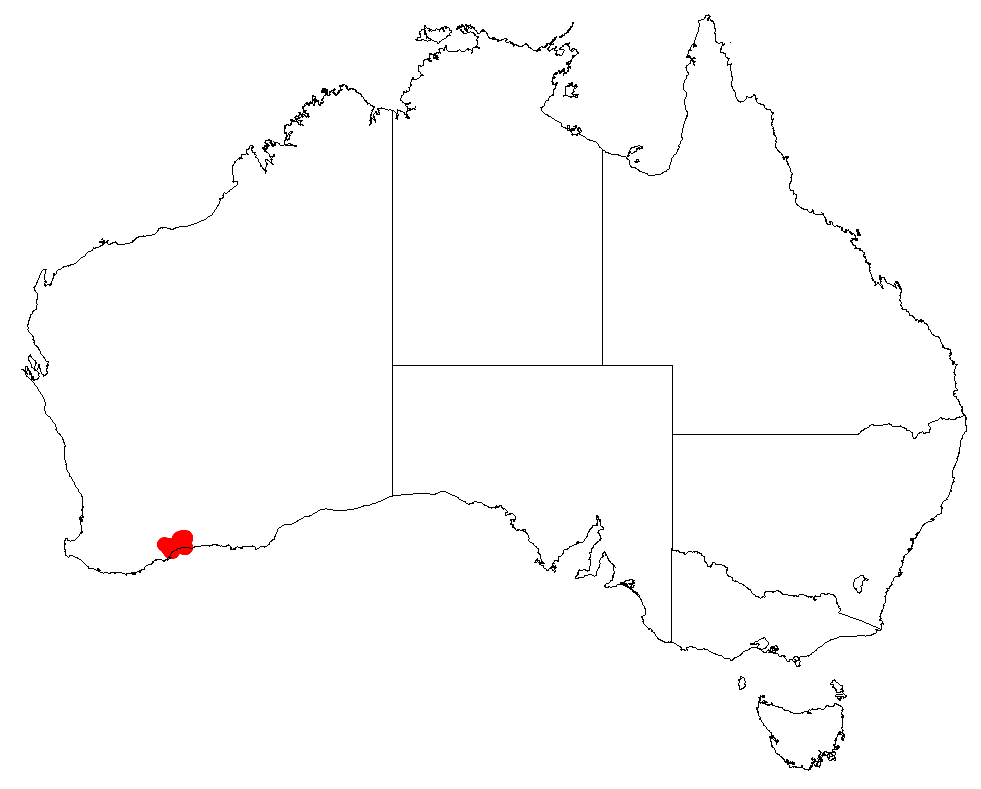
- Occurrence data from Australasian Virtual Herbarium

Synonyms
- Linkia dillwynioides (Meisn.) Kuntze

Species of flowering plant

Persoonia dillwynioides, commonly known as Fitzgerald persoonia, is a species of flowering plant in the family Proteaceae and is endemic to a restricted area in the south-west of Western Australia. It is an erect, spreading shrub with smooth bark, linear leaves and bright yellow flowers borne singly or in groups of up to four along a rachis up to 3 mm (0.12 in) long.

== Description ==
Persoonia dillwynioides is an erect, spreading shrub that typically grows to a height of 0.6–1.8 m (2 ft 0 in – 5 ft 11 in) with smooth, mottled grey bark and branchlets that are angular and densely hairy when young but become cylindrical and glabrous with age. The leaves are arranged alternately along the stems, linear, 10–20 mm (0.39–0.79 in) long and 0.7–1.3 mm (0.028–0.051 in) wide and more or less concave on the upper surface. The flowers are arranged singly or in groups of up to four along a rachis up to 3 mm (0.12 in) long, each flower on a pedicel 1.5–2.5 mm (0.059–0.098 in) long. The tepals are bright yellow, 10–12 mm (0.39–0.47 in) long and 1.3–1.5 mm (0.051–0.059 in) wide and the anthers are bright yellow. Flowering occurs from November to December and the fruit is an oval drupe 7–10.5 mm (0.28–0.41 in) long and 4–5 mm (0.16–0.20 in) wide.

== Taxonomy ==
Persoonia dillwynioides was first formally described in 1856 by Carl Meissner in de Candolle's Prodromus Systematis Naturalis Regni Vegetabilis.

== Distribution and habitat ==
Fitzgerald persoonia occurs within 50 km (31 mi) of the coast of the south-west of Western Australia between the Gairdner River and Hopetoun where it grows in low heath.

== Conservation status ==
This geebung is classified as "not threatened" by the Western Australian Government Department of Parks and Wildlife.
