= Persoonia papillosa =

Conservation status
- Priority Two — Poorly Known Taxa (DEC)

Scientific classification
- Kingdom: Plantae
- Clade: Tracheophytes
- Clade: Angiosperms
- Clade: Eudicots
- Order: Proteales
- Family: Proteaceae
- Genus: Persoonia
- Species: P. papillosa

Binomial name
- Persoonia papillosa P.H.Weston

Species of flowering plant

Persoonia papillosa is a species of flowering plant in the family Proteaceae and is endemic to a restricted area in the west of Western Australia. It is a small, erect shrub with hairy young branchlets, linear leaves with six prominent parallel veins, and hairy flowers borne in groups of up to twenty on a rachis up to 60 mm (2.4 in) long.

== Description ==
Persoonia papillosa is an erect shrub that typically grows to a height of 30 cm (12 in) with young branchlets that are covered with light brown hair when young. The leaves are linear, 15–30 mm (0.59–1.18 in) long and 1–1.3 mm (0.039–0.051 in) wide with six prominent parallel veins. The flowers are arranged in groups of up to twenty along a rachis up to 60 mm (2.4 in) long that usually continues to grow after flowering, each flower on a pedicel 6–14 mm (0.24–0.55 in) long with a leaf or scale leaf at the base. The tepals are densely hairy on the outside, 9.5–11 mm (0.37–0.43 in) long. Flowering occurs from September to January.

== Taxonomy ==
Persoonia papillosa was first formally described in 1994 by Peter Weston in the journal Telopea from specimens collected near Yuna in 1962.

== Distribution and habitat ==
This geebung grows in sand and has only been collected from near the Murchison River and Yuna in the Geraldton Sandplains biogeographic region of Western Australia.

== Conservation status ==
Persoonia papillosa is classified as "Priority Two" by the Western Australian Government Department of Parks and Wildlife meaning that it is poorly known and from only one or a few locations.
