= Persoonia cymbifolia =

Conservation status
- Priority Three — Poorly Known Taxa (DEC)

Scientific classification
- Kingdom: Plantae
- Clade: Tracheophytes
- Clade: Angiosperms
- Clade: Eudicots
- Order: Proteales
- Family: Proteaceae
- Genus: Persoonia
- Species: P. cymbifolia

Binomial name
- Persoonia cymbifolia P.H.Weston
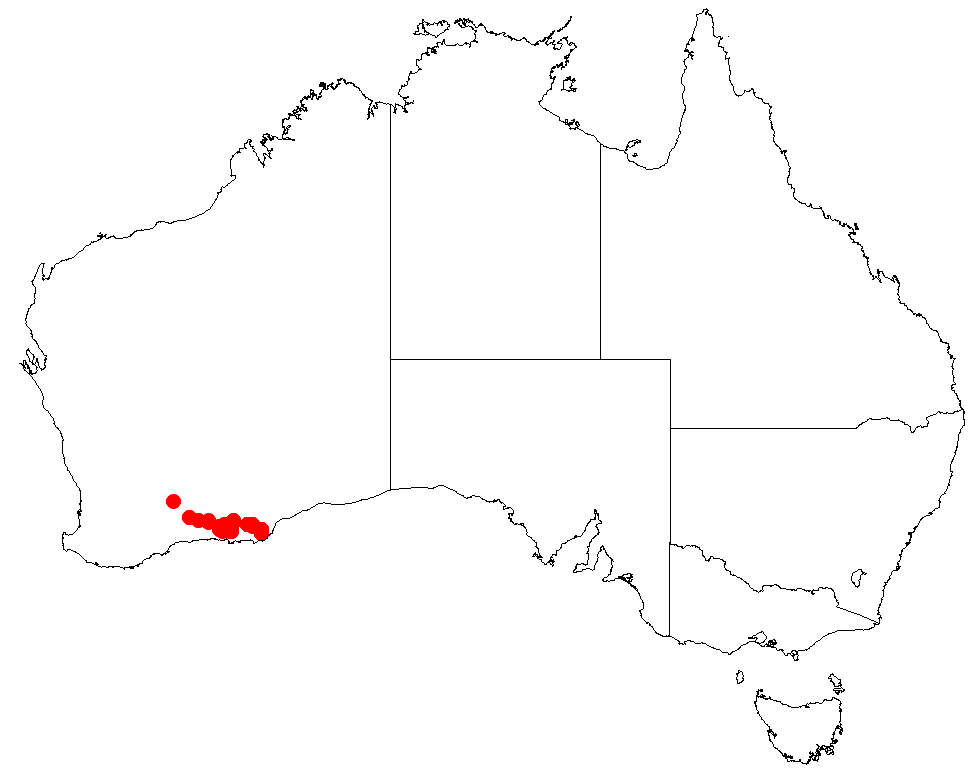
- Occurrence data from Australasian Virtual Herbarium

Species of flowering plant

Persoonia cymbifolia is a species of flowering plant in the family Proteaceae and is endemic to the south of Western Australia. It is an erect, spreading shrub with smooth bark, hairy young branchlets, linear to narrow oblong leaves and yellow flowers borne singly or in groups of up to three on a short rachis.

== Description ==
Persoonia cymbifolia is an erect spreading shrub that typically grows to a height of 0.2–0.6 m (7.9 in – 1 ft 11.6 in) and has smooth, mottled grey bark and densely hairy young branchlets. The leaves are arranged alternately, linear to narrow oblong, 15–45 mm (0.59–1.77 in) long and 1–3 mm (0.039–0.118 in) wide. The flowers are arranged singly, in pairs or groups of three along a rachis about 1 mm (0.039 in) long that grows into a leafy shoot after flowering, each flower on a pedicel 2–3.5 mm (0.079–0.138 in) long. The tepals are yellow, 7–11.5 mm (0.28–0.45 in) long and hairy on the outside with yellow anthers. Flowering occurs from December to January.

== Taxonomy ==
Persoonia cymbifolia was first formally described in 1994 by Peter Weston in the journal Telopea from specimens collected by William R. Archer near Mount Ridley north-east of Esperance in 1991.

== Distribution and habitat ==
This geebung grows in heath from the Frank Hann National Park to the Cape Arid National Park in the Coolgardie, Esperance Plains and Mallee biogeographic regions.

== Conservation status ==
Persoonia cymbifolia is classified as "Priority Three" by the Government of Western Australia Department of Parks and Wildlife meaning that it is poorly known and known from only a few locations but is not under imminent threat.
