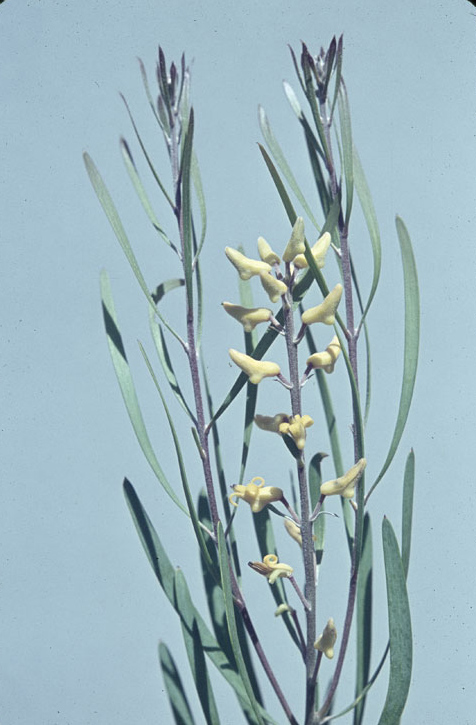

Scientific classification
- Kingdom: Plantae
- Clade: Tracheophytes
- Clade: Angiosperms
- Clade: Eudicots
- Order: Proteales
- Family: Proteaceae
- Genus: Persoonia
- Species: P. comata

Binomial name
- Persoonia comata Meisn.
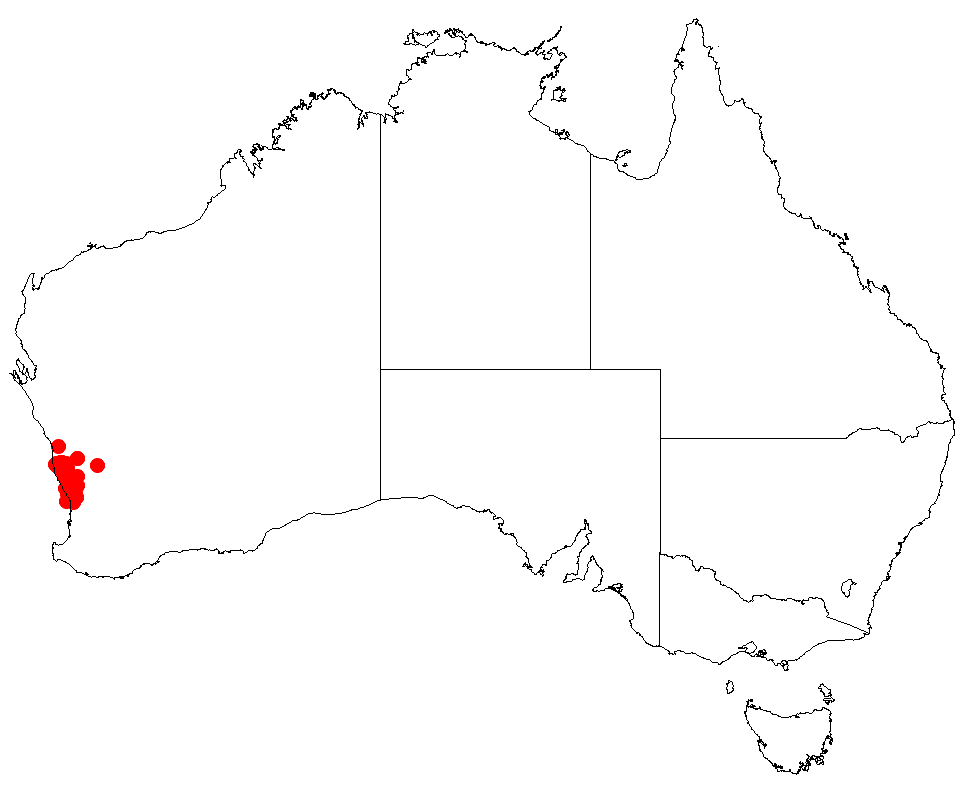
- Occurrence data downloaded from AVH

Synonyms
- Linkia comata (Meisn.) Kuntze

= Persoonia comata =

Species of flowering plant

Persoonia comata is a species of flowering plant in the family Proteaceae and is endemic to the south-west of Western Australia. It is an erect, sometimes spreading to low-lying shrub with mostly smooth bark, spatula-shaped to lance-shaped leaves with the narrower end towards the base and yellow flowers usually in groups of ten to fifty along a rachis up to 250 mm (9.8 in) long.

== Description ==
Persoonia comata is an erect, sometimes spreading to low-lying shrub that typically grows to a height of 0.2–1.5 m (7.9 in – 4 ft 11.1 in) with smooth grey bark, sometimes flaky near the base and branchlets that are densely hairy when young but become glabrous with age. The leaves are arranged alternately along the stems, narrow spatula-shaped to lance-shaped with the narrower end towards the base, 55–150 mm (2.2–5.9 in) long and 2.5–17.5 mm (0.098–0.689 in) wide. The flowers are mostly arranged in groups of ten to fifty along a rachis 20–250 mm (0.79–9.84 in) long, each flower on a pedicel 5–25 mm (0.20–0.98 in) long. The tepals are bright yellow, often tinged with pink, hairy on the outside, the upper tepal 9–15 mm (0.35–0.59 in) long and 1.5–3 mm (0.059–0.118 in) wide, the side tepals asymmetrical and the lower tepal sac-like. The anthers are bright yellow with white tips. Flowering occurs from November to February and the fruit is an oval drupe 8.5–11.5 mm (0.33–0.45 in) long and 5–7 mm (0.20–0.28 in) wide.

== Taxonomy ==
Persoonia comata was first formally described in 1855 by Carl Meissner in Hooker's Journal of Botany and Kew Garden Miscellany.

== Distribution and habitat ==
This geebung grows in Eucalyptus and Banksia forest and woodland or heath, in near-coastal areas between Mount Peron near Jurien Bay and Yanchep in the Avon Wheatbelt, Geraldton Sandplains and Swan Coastal Plain biogeographic regions.

== Conservation status ==
Persoonia comata is classified as "not threatened" by the Western Australian Government Department of Parks and Wildlife.
