= Persoonia baeckeoides =

Conservation status
- Priority One — Poorly Known Taxa (DEC)

Scientific classification
- Kingdom: Plantae
- Clade: Tracheophytes
- Clade: Angiosperms
- Clade: Eudicots
- Order: Proteales
- Family: Proteaceae
- Genus: Persoonia
- Species: P. baeckeoides

Binomial name
- Persoonia baeckeoides P.H.Weston

Species of flowering plant

Persoonia baeckeoides is a species of flowering plant in the family Proteaceae and is endemic to Western Australia. It is an erect, spreading, many-branched shrub with smooth bark, spatula-shaped leaves and greenish yellow flowers arranged singly or in groups of up to three.

== Description ==
Persoonia baeckeoides is an erect, spreading, many-branched shrub that typically grows to a height of 0.5–0.9 m (1 ft 8 in – 2 ft 11 in) and has smooth, mottled grey bark. The leaves are spatula-shaped, 5–11 mm (0.20–0.43 in) long, 2–2 mm (0.079–0.079 in) wide, leathery, rigid and twisted slightly at the base. The flowers are arranged singly or in groups of up to three in leaf axils or on the ends of branchlets, each flower on a pedicel 2–3 mm (0.079–0.118 in) long. The tepals are greenish yellow, 7.5–9 mm (0.30–0.35 in) long and glabrous. Flowering occurs from November to December and the fruit is a smooth oval drupe, 8–10.5 mm (0.31–0.41 in) long and 5–5.5 mm (0.20–0.22 in) wide containing a single seed.

== Taxonomy and naming ==
Persoonia baeckeoides was first formally described in 1994 by Peter Weston in the journal Telopea from specimens he collected in Peak Charles National Park.

== Distribution and habitat ==
This persoonia has only been collected from two locations in Peak Charles National Park where it grows on undulating plains.

== Conservation status ==
Persoonia baeckeoides is classified as "Priority One" by the Government of Western Australia Department of Parks and Wildlife, meaning that it is known from only one or a few locations which are potentially at risk.
