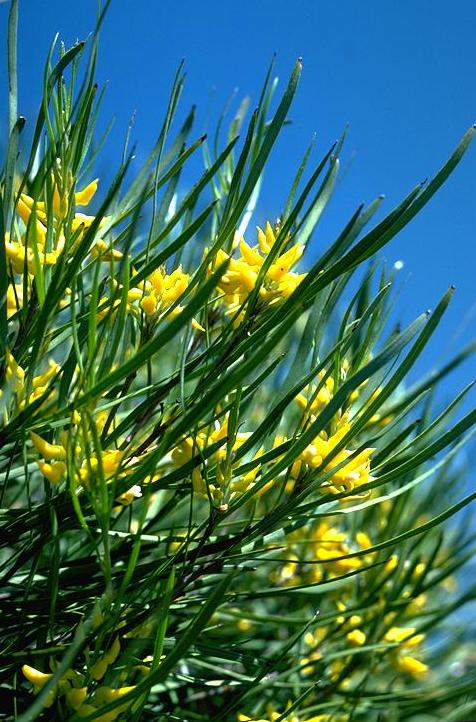

Scientific classification
- Kingdom: Plantae
- Clade: Tracheophytes
- Clade: Angiosperms
- Clade: Eudicots
- Order: Proteales
- Family: Proteaceae
- Genus: Persoonia
- Species: P. stricta

Binomial name
- Persoonia stricta C.A.Gardner ex P.H.Weston

= Persoonia stricta =

Species of flowering plant

Persoonia stricta is a species of flowering plant in the family Proteaceae and is endemic to the south-west of Western Australia. It is an erect, spreading shrub with smooth bark, linear to spatula-shaped or oblong leaves, and bright yellow flowers borne in groups of four to twenty-five on a rachis 3–100 mm (0.12–3.94 in) long, each flower with a leaf or scale leaf at its base.

== Description ==
Persoonia stricta is an erect, spreading shrub that typically grows to a height of 1–5 m (3 ft 3 in – 16 ft 5 in) and has smooth bark, its branches sometimes densely covered with greyish hairs when young. The leaves are linear to spatula-shaped or oblong, 60–150 mm (2.4–5.9 in) long and 2.5–8 mm (0.098–0.315 in) wide and pimply or scaly. The flowers are arranged in groups of four to twenty-five on a rachis 3–100 mm (0.12–3.94 in) long, each flower on a pedicel 4–10 mm (0.16–0.39 in) long with a leaf or scale leaf at its base. The tepals are bright yellow, 11–16 mm (0.43–0.63 in) long and mostly glabrous on the outside. Flowering occurs from August to December and the fruit is a smooth drupe.

== Taxonomy ==
Persoonia stricta was first formally described in 1994 by Peter Weston in the journal Telopea from an unpublished description by Charles Gardner, the type specimens collected by Gardner from near Manmanning in 1931.

== Distribution and habitat ==
This geebung grows in heath, thicket or woodland between Ajana and Manmanning in the Avon Wheatbelt, Geraldton Sandplains, Murchison, Swan Coastal Plain and Yalgoo biogeographic regions in the south-west of Western Australia.

== Conservation status ==
Persoonia saundersiana is classified as "not threatened" by the Government of Western Australia Department of Parks and Wildlife.
