= Persoonia pertinax =

Scientific classification
- Kingdom: Plantae
- Clade: Tracheophytes
- Clade: Angiosperms
- Clade: Eudicots
- Order: Proteales
- Family: Proteaceae
- Genus: Persoonia
- Species: P. pertinax

Binomial name
- Persoonia pertinax P.H.Weston

Species of flowering plant

Persoonia pertinax is a species of flowering plant in the family Proteaceae and is endemic to Western Australia. It is an erect to spreading shrub with hairy young branchlets, twisted linear leaves, and hairy yellow flowers borne in groups of up to ten on a rachis up to 60 mm (2.4 in) long.

== Description ==
Persoonia pertinax is an erect to spreading shrub that typically grows to a height of 1–2.5 m (3 ft 3 in – 8 ft 2 in) with smooth bark and young branchlets that are covered with greyish hair when young. The leaves are linear, flattened, 20–55 mm (0.79–2.17 in) long, 1–2.5 mm (0.039–0.098 in) wide and twisted through 90°. The flowers are arranged in groups of up to ten along a rachis up to 60 mm (2.4 in) long, each flower on a pedicel 3.5–7 mm (0.14–0.28 in) long, with a leaf or a scale leaf at the base. The tepals are yellow, hairy on the outside and 8–11 mm (0.31–0.43 in) long. Flowering occurs from January to March and the fruit is a flattened oval drupe 8.5–11 mm (0.33–0.43 in) long and 4.5–6 mm (0.18–0.24 in) wide.

== Taxonomy ==
Persoonia pertinax was first formally described in 1994 by Peter Weston in the journal Telopea from specimens collected by Robert Royce near Queen Victoria Spring in 1956. The specific epithet means "tenacious" or "unyielding", referring to the species' ability to survive in its arid environment.

== Distribution and habitat ==
This geebung grows in sandy soil in woodland near Cundeelee in the Coolgardie and Great Victoria Desert biogeographic regions of Western Australia.

== Conservation status ==
Persoonia pertinax is classified as "not threatened" by the Government of Western Australia Department of Parks and Wildlife.
