= Persoonia rudis =

Conservation status
- Priority Three — Poorly Known Taxa (DEC)

Scientific classification
- Kingdom: Plantae
- Clade: Tracheophytes
- Clade: Angiosperms
- Clade: Eudicots
- Order: Proteales
- Family: Proteaceae
- Genus: Persoonia
- Species: P. rudis

Binomial name
- Persoonia rudis Meisn.

Synonyms
- Linkia rudis (Meisn.) Kuntze

Species of flowering plant

Persoonia rudis is a species of flowering plant in the family Proteaceae and is endemic to the south-west of Western Australia. It is an erect shrub with hairy young branchlets, linear leaves, and yellow flowers borne in groups of five to thirty on a rachis 3–100 mm (0.12–3.94 in) that continues to grow after flowering.

== Description ==
Persoonia rudis is an erect shrub that typically grows to a height of 0.2–1 m (7.9 in – 3 ft 3.4 in) with young branchlets that are covered with pale brown or greyish hair. The leaves are linear, 15–45 mm (0.59–1.77 in) long and 0.7–1.4 mm (0.028–0.055 in) wide with a pointed but not sharp tip. The flowers are arranged in groups of five to thirty along a rachis 3–100 mm (0.12–3.94 in) long that continues to grow after flowering, each flower on a pedicel 2–10 mm (0.079–0.394 in) long with a leaf or a scale leaf at the base. The tepals are yellow, 8–14 mm (0.31–0.55 in) long and the anthers are yellow. Flowering occurs from October to January and the fruit is a smooth, moderately hairy drupe 8.5–9 mm (0.33–0.35 in) long and 5.5–6 mm (0.22–0.24 in) wide.

== Taxonomy ==
Persoonia rudis was first formally described in 1856 by Carl Meissner in de Candolle's Prodromus Systematis Naturalis Regni Vegetabilis from specimens collected in the Swan River Colony by James Drummond.

== Distribution and habitat ==
This geebung grows in low heath and forest between Three Springs and Mogumber in the Geraldton Sandplains, Jarrah Forest, Swan Coastal Plain biogeographic regions in the south-west of Western Australia.

== Conservation status ==
Persoonia rudis is classified as "Priority Three" by the Government of Western Australia Department of Parks and Wildlife meaning that it is poorly known and known from only a few locations but is not under imminent threat.
