= Persoonia kararae =

Conservation status
- Priority Two — Poorly Known Taxa (DEC)

Scientific classification
- Kingdom: Plantae
- Clade: Tracheophytes
- Clade: Angiosperms
- Clade: Eudicots
- Order: Proteales
- Family: Proteaceae
- Genus: Persoonia
- Species: P. kararae

Binomial name
- Persoonia kararae P.H.Weston

Species of flowering plant

Persoonia kararae is a species of flowering plant in the family Proteaceae and is endemic to the Perenjori district of Western Australia. It is an erect, spreading shrub with densely hairy branchlets, linear leaves and yellow flowers in groups of up to ten on a rachis up to 10 mm (0.39 in) long.

== Description ==
Persoonia kararae is an erect, spreading shrub that typically grows to a height of 1–5 m (3 ft 3 in – 16 ft 5 in) with branchlets that are densely hairy when young. The leaves are arranged alternately, linear but flattened, 80–140 mm (3.1–5.5 in) long, 3–3.5 mm (0.12–0.14 in) wide and leathery to soft and flexible. The flowers are usually borne singly or in groups of up to ten on a rachis up to 10 mm (0.39 in) long, each flower on a hairy pedicel 5–7 mm (0.20–0.28 in) long. The tepals are yellow, hairy on the outside, 11.5–13.5 mm (0.45–0.53 in) long, the lower tepal sac-like, with yellow anthers. Flowering occurs from September to November and the fruit is a smooth drupe.

== Taxonomy ==
Persoonia kararae was first formally described in 1994 by Peter Weston in the journal Telopea from specimens collected by Ernst Wittwer near the Karara boundary gate in 1975.

== Distribution and habitat ==
This geebung is only known from two collections from Karara Station (now part of the Karara and Lochada Important Bird Area) in the Perenjori district in the Yalgoo biogeographic region of Western Australia.

== Conservation status ==
This species is classified as "Priority Two" by the Western Australian Government Department of Parks and Wildlife meaning that it is poorly known and from only one or a few locations.
