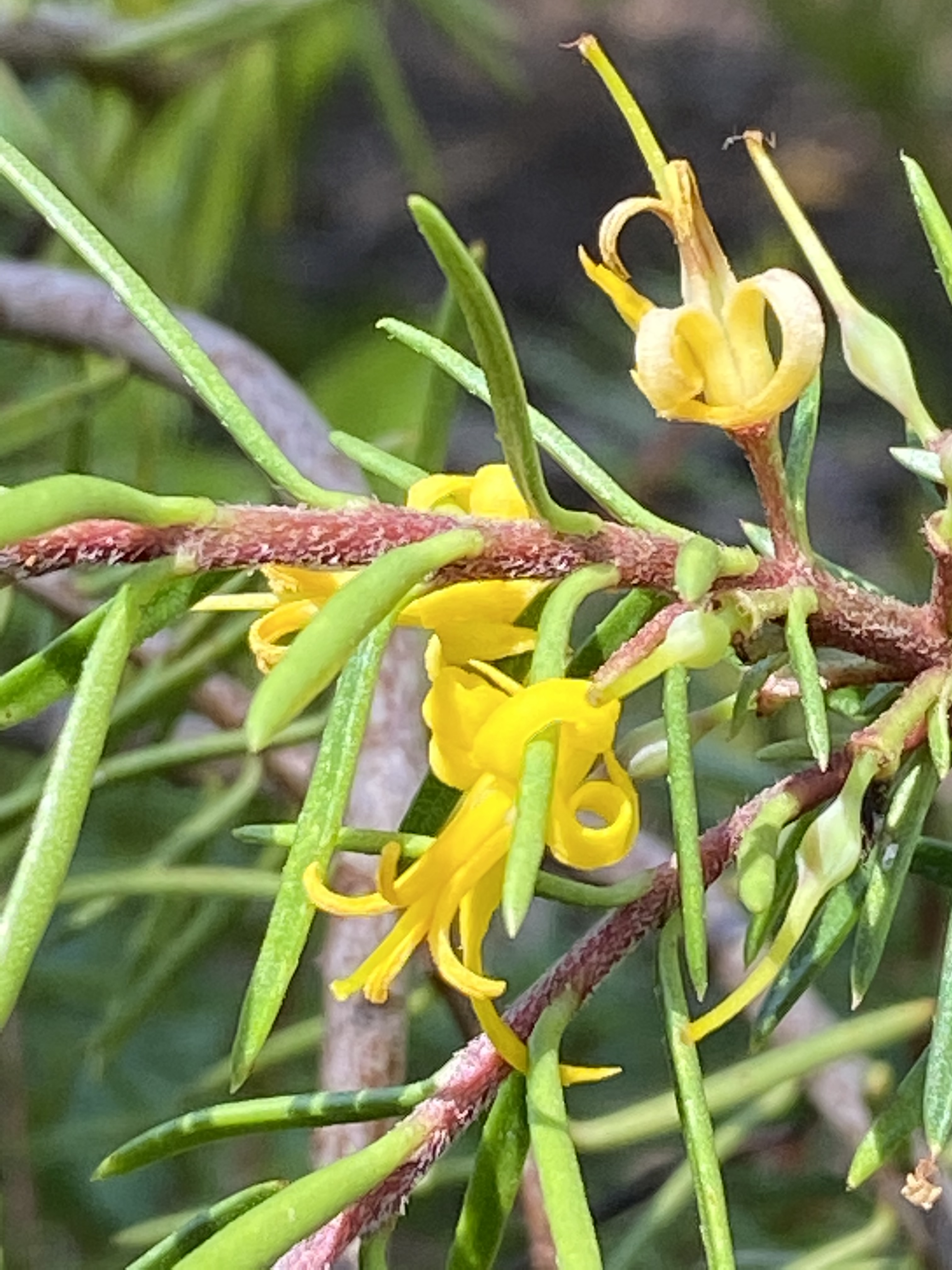
- In the ABG

Scientific classification
- Kingdom: Plantae
- Clade: Tracheophytes
- Clade: Angiosperms
- Clade: Eudicots
- Order: Proteales
- Family: Proteaceae
- Genus: Persoonia
- Species: P. hindii

Binomial name
- Persoonia hindii P.H.Weston & L.A.S.Johnson
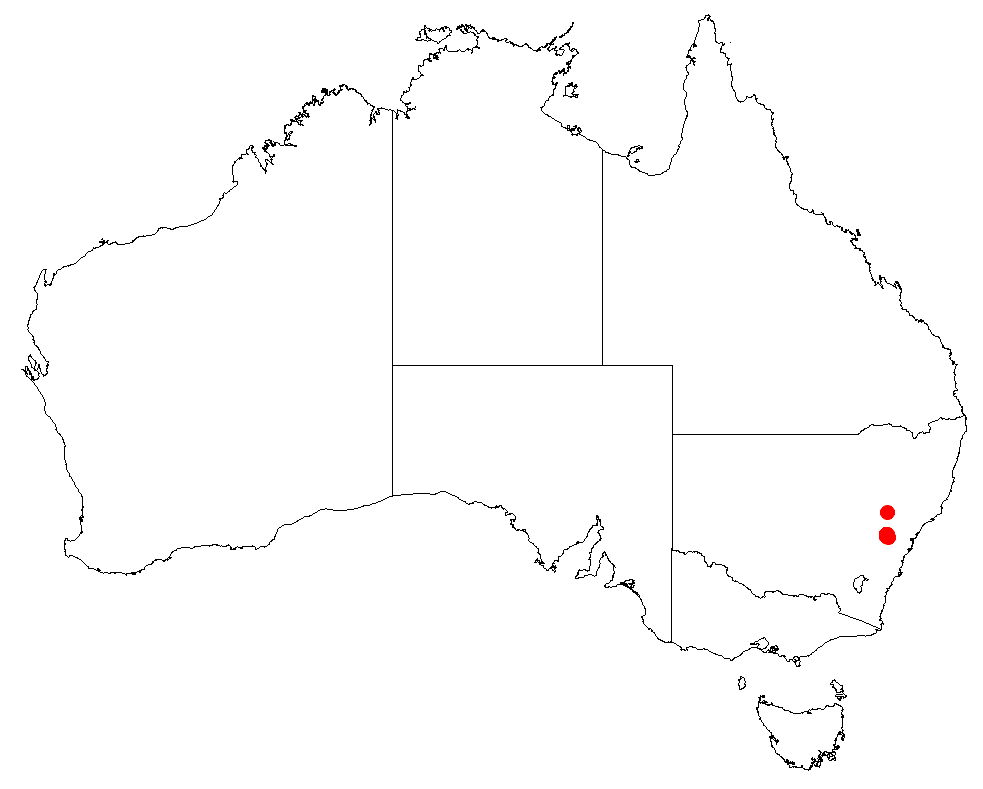
- Occurrence data from Australasian Virtual Herbarium

= Persoonia hindii =

Species of shrub

Persoonia hindii is a species of flowering plant in the family Proteaceae and is endemic to a small area of New South Wales near Lithgow, Australia. It is a shrub with an underground stolon from which new stems arise and has succulent, linear to oblong leaves and deep yellow flowers.

== Description ==
Persoonia hindii is an erect or spreading shrub with many stems that grow from an underground stolon about 5 cm (2 in) underground. The stems reach to a height of 0.3–1.0 m (1–3 ft) with smooth grey bark on older growth. Younger stem are mostly dull red and are covered with greyish hairs. The leaves are arranged alternately and are linear to oblong, mostly 15–27 mm (0.6–1 in) long, 1–2 mm (0.04–0.08 in) wide, succulent and more or less semi-circular in cross-section. Young leaves are slightly hairy but become glabrous as they age. The flowers are arranged singly or in small groups of up to thirteen in leaf axils or on the ends of branches, with a scale leaf at the base of each flower. Each flower is on the end of a hairy dull red pedicel 2.5–5 mm (0.1–0.2 in) long. The flower is composed of four hairy tepals 12–15 mm (0.5–0.6 in) long, which are fused at the base but with the tips rolled back. The central style is surrounded by four yellow anthers which are also joined at the base with the tips rolled back, so that it resembles a cross when viewed end-on. The ovary is glabrous. Flowering occurs mainly from January to March and is followed by fruit which are dull green drupes 8–9.5 mm (0.3–0.4 in) long and about 6 mm (0.2 in) wide.

== Taxonomy and naming ==
Persoonia hindii was first formally described in 1997 by Peter Weston and Lawrie Johnson from a specimen collected in the Newnes State Forest. The description was published in Telopea. The specific epithet (hindii) honours Peter Hind, who first collected this species in 1989.

== Distribution and habitat ==
This persoonia is only known from nine populations in the Newnes State Forest, each population consisting of only one to a small number of individual plants. It grows in forest and woodland dominated by species of Eucalyptus.

== Conservation ==
Persoonia hindii is threatened by forestry activities, sand mining and frequent fires and is classified as "Endangered" under the New South Wales Government Biodiversity Conservation Act 2016.
