= Persoonia subtilis =

Scientific classification
- Kingdom: Plantae
- Clade: Tracheophytes
- Clade: Angiosperms
- Clade: Eudicots
- Order: Proteales
- Family: Proteaceae
- Genus: Persoonia
- Species: P. subtilis

Binomial name
- Persoonia subtilis P.H.Weston & L.A.S.Johnson

Species of shrub

Persoonia subtilis is a plant in the family Proteaceae and is endemic to south-east Queensland. It is a spreading to low-lying shrub with many stems, branchlets that are hairy when young, linear leaves and yellow flowers in groups of up to eighteen on a rachis up to 50 mm (2.0 in) long.

== Description ==
Persoonia subtilis is a spreading to low-lying shrub that typically grows to a height of 15–100 cm (5.9–39.4 in) with many stems, and young branchlets covered with greyish to brownish hairs. The leaves are linear, 15–50 mm (0.59–1.97 in) long and 0.4–0.8 mm (0.016–0.031 in) wide that curve upwards, with a groove on the lower surface. The flowers are arranged in groups of up to eighteen along a rachis up to 50 mm (2.0 in) long that usually continues to grow after flowering, each flower on a hairy pedicel 2–8 mm (0.079–0.315 in) long with a leaf or scale leaf at its base. The tepals are yellow and 7–10 mm (0.28–0.39 in) long. Flowering mainly occurs from November to January and the fruit is a green drupe with purple stripes.

== Taxonomy ==
Persoonia subtilis was first formally described in 1994 by Peter Weston and Lawrie Johnson in the journal Telopea from specimens collected in 1990 near the falls on Mimosa Creek on the Blackdown Tableland.

== Distribution and habitat ==
This geebung grows in forest and woodland in the area between the Blackdown Tableland, Carnarvon Range and Barakula in south-eastern Queensland.
