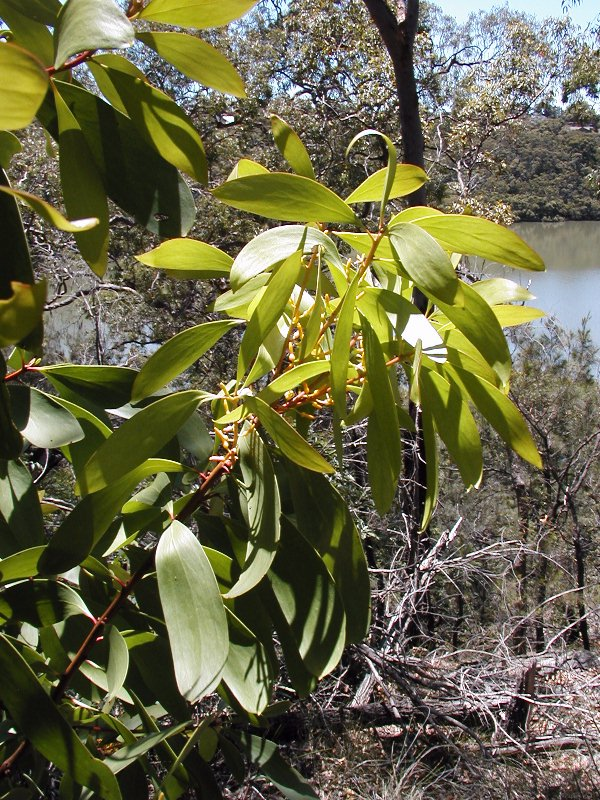
- Persoonia levis

Scientific classification
- Kingdom: Plantae
- Clade: Tracheophytes
- Clade: Angiosperms
- Clade: Eudicots
- Order: Proteales
- Family: Proteaceae
- Subfamily: Persoonioideae
- Tribe: Persoonieae
- Genus: Persoonia; Sm.

Type species
- Persoonia lanceolata

Species
- See text
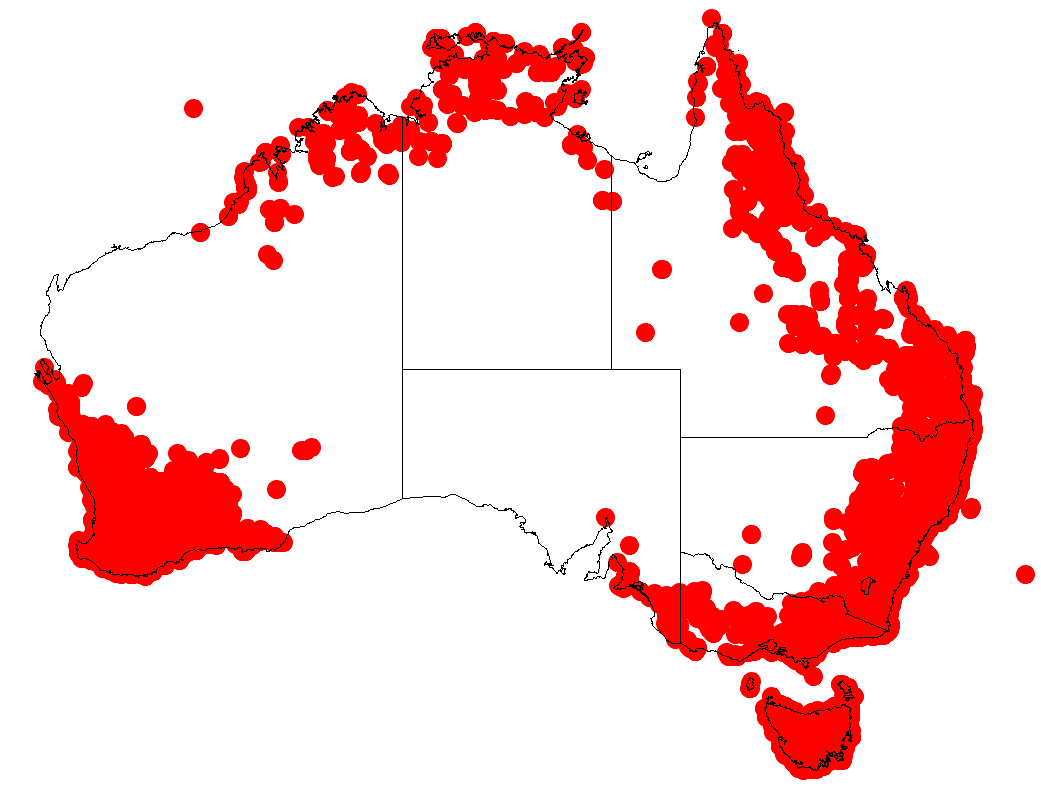
- Occurrence data downloaded from AVH

Synonyms
- Acidonia L.A.S.Johnson & B.G.Briggs; Garnieria Brongn. & Gris; Linkia Cav. nom. illeg. nom. rej.; Pentadactylon C.F.Gaertn.; Pycnonia L.A.S.Johnson & B.G.Briggs; Toronia L.A.S.Johnson & B.G.Briggs

= Persoonia =

Genus of shrubs and small trees

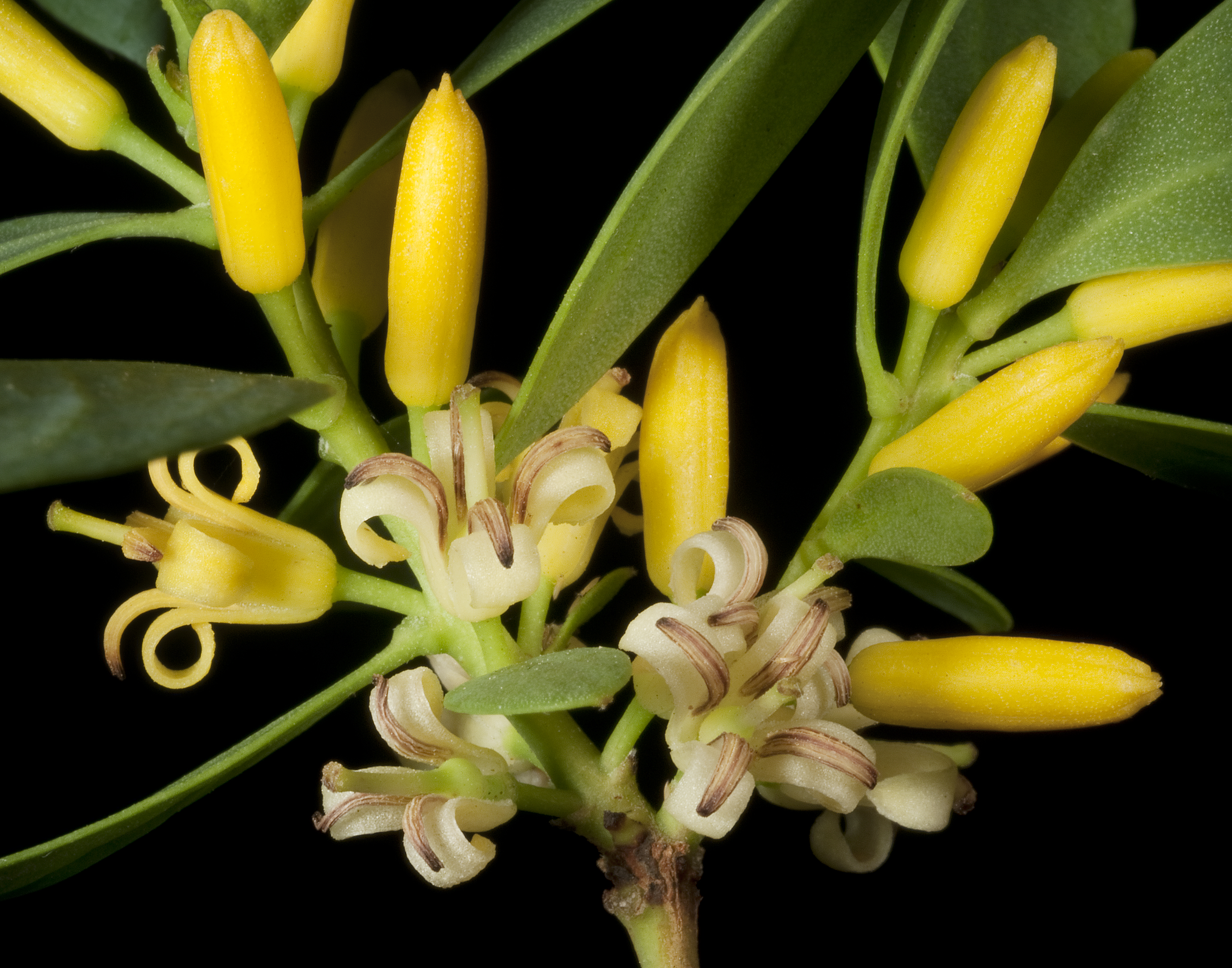
Persoonia elliptica

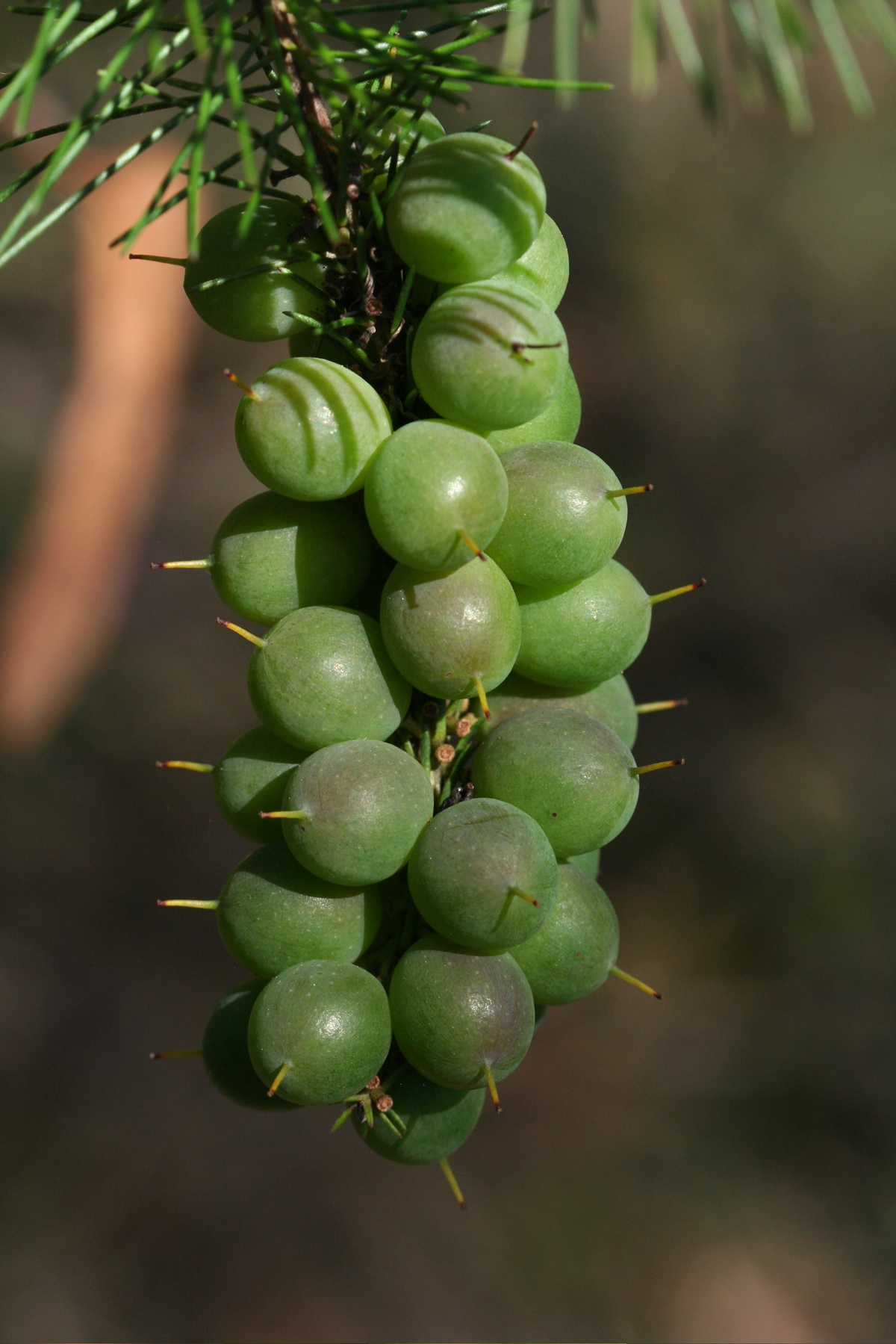
Persoonia pinifolia fruit

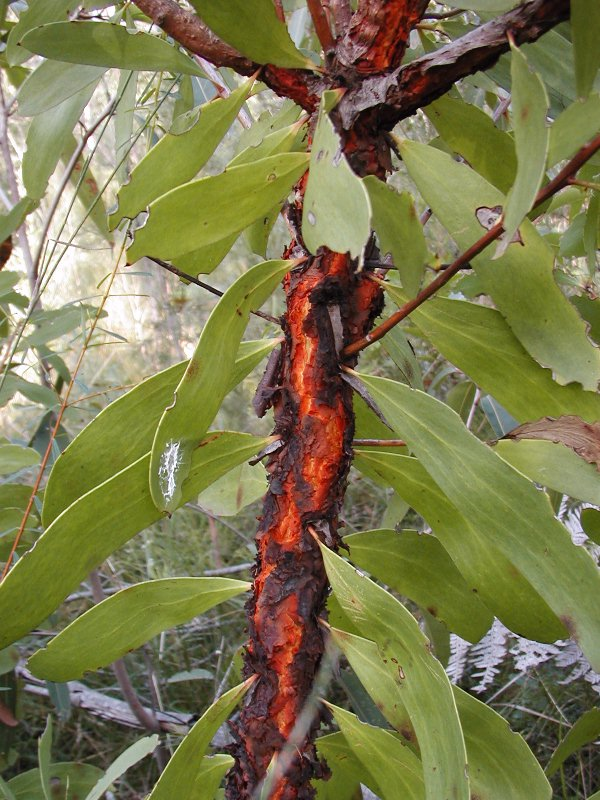
Persoonia levis bark

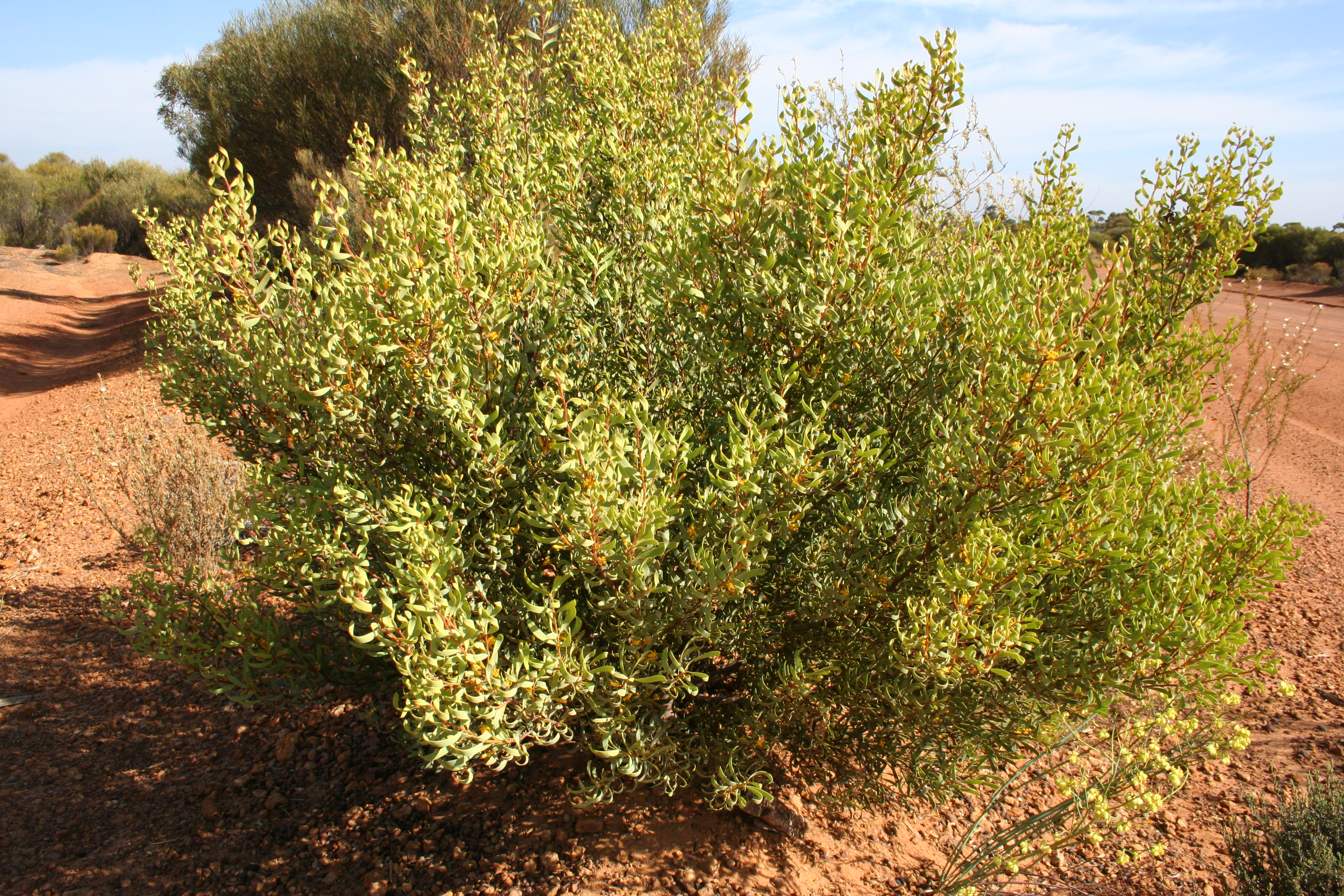
Persoonia coriacea shrub on road verge, near Yellowdine, Western Australia

Persoonia, commonly known as geebungs or snottygobbles, is a genus of about one hundred species of flowering plants in the family Proteaceae. Plants in the genus Persoonia are shrubs or small trees usually with smooth bark, simple leaves and usually yellow flowers arranged along a raceme, each flower with a leaf or scale leaf at the base. The fruit is a drupe.

== Description ==
Persoonias are usually shrubs, sometimes small trees and usually have smooth bark. The adult leaves are simple, usually arranged alternately but sometimes in opposite pairs, or in whorls of three or four. If a petiole is present, it is short. The flowers are arranged singly or in racemes, usually of a few flowers, either in leaf axils or on the ends of the branches. Sometimes the raceme continues to grow into a leafy shoot. The tepals are free from each other except near their base, have their tips rolled back and are usually yellow. There is a single stigma on top of the ovary and surrounded by four stamens. The fruit is a drupe containing one or two seeds.

== Taxonomy and naming ==
The genus Persoonia was first formally described in 1798 by James Edward Smith and the description was published in Transactions of the Linnean Society of London. The generic name is in honour of Dutch mycologist and botanist Christiaan Hendrik Persoon. Smith did not nominate a type species but in 1988, Persoonia lanceolata was nominated as the lectotype.

The term geebung is derived from the Dharug language word geebung, while the Wiradjuri term was jibbong. The etymology of "snottygobble" is more obscure. The English Dialect Dictionary published in 1904 lists snotergob, snot-gob and snotty-gobble as "the fruit of the yew-tree, Taxus baccata" noting that "children devour quantities of the red part of these berries, which they call snotty-gobbles, and suffer no ill-effects". The pulp around the hard stone in the drupes of Persoonia is edible although "the operation is a little like nibbling sweet cotton wool".

Molecular hylogenetic studies indicate that Toronia, Garnieria and Acidonia all lie within the large genus Persoonia.

== Distribution and habitat ==
Most species of Persoonia are endemic to Australia, with one species, Persoonia toru found in New Zealand, and Persoonia spathulifolia endemic to New Caledonia. In Australia, they are widespread in non-arid regions. One species, P. pertinax, is found only in the Great Victoria Desert, while a few other species venture into the arid zone, but most are concentrated in the subtropical to temperate parts of south eastern and south western Australia, including Tasmania.

Most species are plants of well-drained, acid, sandy or sandstone-based soils that are low in nutrients, although one, Persoonia graminea, grows in swampy habitats. Three species (P. acicularis, P. bowgada and P. hexagona) tolerate mildly calcareous soils, and several south eastern species sometimes grow on basalt-derived soils, but these are unusual. The greatest diversity of species is found in areas with soils derived from sandstones and granites.

== Ecology ==
The flowers of Persoonia species are pollinated by native bees, especially from the genus Leioproctus, most commonly L. speculiferus, and the introduced Apis mellifera.

== Species list ==
The following is a list of species of Persoonia accepted by Plants of the World Online as of March 2025:

- Persoonia acerosa Sieber ex Schult. & Schult.f. - needle geebung (N.S.W.)
- Persoonia acicularis F.Muell. (W.A.)
- Persoonia acuminata L.A.S.Johnson & P.H.Weston (N.S.W.)
- Persoonia adenantha Domin (N.S.W., Qld.)
- Persoonia amaliae Domin (Qld.)
- Persoonia × angulata R.Br. (P. acerosa × P. levis) (N.S.W.)
- Persoonia angustiflora Benth. (W.A.)
- Persoonia arborea F.Muell. – tree geebung (Vic.)
- Persoonia asperula L.A.S.Johnson & P.H.Weston – mountain geebung (N.S.W., Vic.)
- Persoonia × attenuata R.Br. (P. stradbrokensis × P. virgata) (SE. Qld.)
- Persoonia baeckeoides P.H.Weston (W.A.)
- Persoonia bargoensis L.A.S.Johnson & P.H.Weston – Bargo geebung (N.S.W.)
- Persoonia biglandulosa P.H.Weston (W.A.)
- Persoonia bowgada P.H.Weston (W.A.)
- Persoonia brachystylis F.Muell. (W.A.)
- Persoonia brevifolia (Benth.) L.A.S.Johnson & P.H.Weston (N.S.W., Vic.)
- Persoonia brevirhachis P.H.Weston (W.A.)
- Persoonia chamaepeuce Lhotsky ex Meisn. – yellow geebung, dwarf geebung (A.C.T., N.S.W., Vic)
- Persoonia chamaepitys A.Cunn. – prostrate geebung, mountain geebung (N.S.W.)
- Persoonia chapmaniana P.H.Weston (W.A.)
- Persoonia comata Meisn. (W.A.)
- Persoonia confertiflora Benth. – cluster-flower geebung (N.S.W., Vic.)
- Persoonia conjuncta L.A.S.Johnson & P.H.Weston (N.S.W.)
- Persoonia cordifolia P.H.Weston (W.A.)
- Persoonia coriacea Audas & P.Morris – leathery-leaf persoonia (W.A.)
- Persoonia cornifolia A.Cunn. ex R.Br. (N.S.W., Qld.)
- Persoonia curvifolia R.Br. (N.S.W.)
- Persoonia cuspidifera L.A.S.Johnson & P.H.Weston (N.S.W.)
- Persoonia cymbifolia P.H.Weston (W.A.)
- Persoonia daphnoides A.Cunn. ex R.Br. (N.S.W., Qld.)
- Persoonia dillwynioides Meisn. (W.A.)
- Persoonia elliptica R.Br. – snottygobble (W.A.)
- Persoonia falcata R.Br. – wild pear (N.T., Qld., W.A.)
- Persoonia fastigiata R.Br. (N.S.W.)
- Persoonia filiformis P.H.Weston (W.A.)
- Persoonia flexifolia R.Br. (W.A.)
- Persoonia glaucescens Sieber ex Spreng. – Mittagong geebung (N.S.W.)
- Persoonia graminea R.Br. (W.A.)
- Persoonia gunnii Hook.f. – mountain geebung (Tas.)
- Persoonia hakeiformis Meisn. (W.A.)
- Persoonia helix P.H.Weston (W.A.)
- Persoonia hexagona P.H.Weston (W.A.)
- Persoonia hindii P.H.Weston & L.A.S.Johnson (N.S.W.)
- Persoonia hirsuta Pers. – hairy persoonia, hairy geebung
  - Persoonia hirsuta subsp. evoluta L.A.S.Johnson & P.H.Weston (N.S.W.)
  - Persoonia hirsuta Pers. subsp. hirsuta (N.S.W.)
- Persoonia inconspicua P.H.Weston (W.A.)
- Persoonia iogyna P.H.Weston & L.A.S.Johnson (Qld.)
- Persoonia isophylla L.A.S.Johnson & P.H.Weston (N.S.W.)
- Persoonia juniperina Labill. – prickly geebung (N.S.W., S.A., Tas., Vic.)
- Persoonia kararae P.H.Weston (W.A.)
- Persoonia katerae P.H.Weston & L.A.S.Johnson (N.S.W.)
- Persoonia lanceolata Andrews – lance-leaf geebung (N.S.W.)
- Persoonia laurina Pers. – laurel-leaved geebung, laurel geebung (N.S.W.)
  - Persoonia laurina subsp. intermedia L.A.S.Johnson & P.H.Weston (N.S.W.)
  - Persoonia laurina Pers. subsp. laurina (N.S.W.)
  - Persoonia laurina subsp. leiogyna L.A.S.Johnson & P.H.Weston (N.S.W.)
- Persoonia laxa L.A.S.Johnson & P.H.Weston (N.S.W.)
- Persoonia leucopogon S.Moore (W.A.)
- Persoonia levis (Cav.) Domin – broad-leaved geebung (N.S.W., Vic.)
- Persoonia linearis Andrews – narrow-leaved geebung (N.S.W., Vic.)
- Persoonia longifolia R.Br. – long-leaf persoonia (W.A.)
- Persoonia × lucida R.Br. (P. levis × P. linearis) (N.S.W. & Vic.)
- Persoonia manotricha A.S.Markey & R.Butcher (W.A.)
- Persoonia marginata A.Cunn. ex R.Br. – Clandulla geebung (N.S.W.)
- Persoonia media R.Br. (N.S.W., Qld.)
- Persoonia micranthera P.H.Weston – small-flowered snottygobble (W.A.)
- Persoonia microcarpa R.Br. (W.A.)
- Persoonia microphylla R.Br. (N.S.W.)
- Persoonia mollis R.Br. (N.S.W.)
  - Persoonia mollis subsp. budawangensis S.Krauss & L.A.S.Johnson (N.S.W.)
  - Persoonia mollis subsp. caleyi (R.Br.) S.Krauss & L.A.S.Johnson (N.S.W.)
  - Persoonia mollis subsp. ledifolia (A.Cunn. ex Meisn.) S.Krauss & L.A.S.Johnson (N.S.W.)
  - Persoonia mollis subsp. leptophylla S.Krauss & L.A.S.Johnson (N.S.W.)
  - Persoonia mollis subsp. livens S.Krauss & L.A.S.Johnson (N.S.W.)
  - Persoonia mollis subsp. maxima S.Krauss & L.A.S.Johnson (N.S.W.)
  - Persoonia mollis R.Br. subsp. mollis (N.S.W.)
  - Persoonia mollis subsp. nectens S.Krauss & L.A.S.Johnson (N.S.W.)
  - Persoonia mollis subsp. revoluta S.Krauss & L.A.S.Johnson (N.S.W.)
- Persoonia moscalii Orchard – creeping geebung (Tas.)
- Persoonia muelleri (P.Parm.) Orchard – Mueller’s geebung (Tas.)
  - Persoonia muelleri subsp. angustifolia (Benth.) L.A.S.Johnson & P.H.Weston (Tas.)
  - Persoonia muelleri subsp. densifolia (Orchard) L.A.S.Johnson & P.H.Weston (Tas.)
  - Persoonia muelleri (P.Parm.) Orchard var. muelleri (Tas.)
- Persoonia myrtilloides Sieber ex Schult. & Schult.f. – myrtle geebung (N.S.W.)
  - Persoonia myrtilloides subsp. cunninghamii (R.Br.) L.A.S.Johnson & P.H.Weston (N.S.W.)
  - Persoonia myrtilloides Pers. subsp. myrtilloides (N.S.W.)
- Persoonia nutans R.Br. – nodding geebung (N.S.W.)
- Persoonia oblongata R.Br. (N.S.W.)
- Persoonia oleoides L.A.S.Johnson & P.H.Weston (N.S.W.)
- Persoonia oxycoccoides Sieber ex Spreng. (N.S.W.)
- Persoonia papillosa P.H.Weston (W.A.)
- Persoonia pauciflora P.H.Weston – North Rothbury persoonia (N.S.W.)
- Persoonia pentasticha P.H.Weston (W.A.)
- Persoonia pertinax P.H.Weston (W.A.)
- Persoonia pinifolia R.Br. – pine-leaved geebung (N.S.W.)
- Persoonia procumbens L.A.S.Johnson & P.H.Weston (N.S.W.)
- Persoonia prostrata R.Br. (Qld.)
- Persoonia pungens W.Fitzg. (W.A.)
- Persoonia quinquenervis Hook. (W.A.)
- Persoonia recedens Gand. (N.S.W.)
- Persoonia rigida R.Br. – rigid, hairy, or stiff geebung (A.C.T., N.S.W., Vic.)
- Persoonia rudis Meisn. (W.A.)
- Persoonia rufa L.A.S.Johnson & P.H.Weston (N.S.W.)
- Persoonia rufiflora Meisn. (W.A.)
- Persoonia saccata R.Br. (W.A.)
- Persoonia saundersiana Kippist (W.A..)
- Persoonia scabra R.Br. (W.A.)
- Persoonia sericea A.Cunn. ex R.Br. – silky geebung (N.S.W., Qld.)
- Persoonia silvatica L.A.S.Johnson (N.S.W., Vic.)
- Persoonia spathulata R.Br. (W.A.)
- Persoonia spathulifolia (Brongn. & Gris) Pillon (New Caledonia)
- Persoonia stradbrokensis Domin (Qld., N.S.W.)
- Persoonia striata R.Br. (W.A.)
- Persoonia stricta C.A.Gardner ex P.H.Weston (W.A.)
- Persoonia subtilis P.H.Weston & L.A.S.Johnson (Qld.)
- Persoonia subvelutina L.A.S.Johnson – velvety geebung (A.C.T., N.S.W., Vic.)
- Persoonia sulcata Meisn. (W.A.)
- Persoonia tenuifolia R.Br. (N.S.W., Qld.)
- Persoonia teretifolia R.Br. (W.A.)
- Persoonia terminalis L.A.S.Johnson & P.H.Weston – Torrington geebung (N.S.W., Qld.)
  - Persoonia terminalis subsp. recurva L.A.S.Johnson & P.H.Weston (N.S.W., Qld.)
  - Persoonia terminalis L.A.S.Johnson & P.H.Weston subsp. terminalis (N.S.W.)
- Persoonia toru A.Cunn. (New Zealand)
- Persoonia trinervis Meisn. (W.A.)
- Persoonia tropica L.A.S.Johnson & P.H.Weston (Qld.)
- Persoonia virgata R.Br. (N.S.W., Qld.)
- Persoonia volcanica P.H.Weston & L.A.S.Johnson (N.S.W., Qld.)
