= Persoonia cordifolia =

Scientific classification
- Kingdom: Plantae
- Clade: Tracheophytes
- Clade: Angiosperms
- Clade: Eudicots
- Order: Proteales
- Family: Proteaceae
- Genus: Persoonia
- Species: P. cordifolia

Binomial name
- Persoonia cordifolia P.H.Weston

Species of flowering plant

Persoonia cordifolia is a species of flowering plant in the family Proteaceae and is endemic to a restricted area in the south of Western Australia. It is an erect, rounded to spreading shrub with smooth, mottled grey bark, broadly heart-shaped leaves and bright yellow flowers borne in groups of two to eight along a rachis up to 25 mm (0.98 in) long.

== Description ==
Persoonia cordifolia is an erect, rounded to spreading shrub that typically grows to a height of 1–2 m (3 ft 3 in – 6 ft 7 in) with many stems arising from the base and has smooth, mottled grey bark. The leaves are arranged in opposite pairs, broadly heart-shaped, 7–12 mm (0.28–0.47 in) long and 6–13 mm (0.24–0.51 in) wide. The flowers are arranged in groups of two to eight along a rachis up to 25 mm (0.98 in) long that grows into a leafy shoot after flowering, each flower on a pedicel 3–5 mm (0.12–0.20 in) long. The tepals are bright yellow, about 11 mm (0.43 in) long with bright yellow anthers. Flowering occurs from December to January.

== Taxonomy and naming ==
Persoonia cordifolia was first formally described in 1994 by Peter Weston in the journal Telopea from specimens collected by William R. Archer near Mount Heywood, 130 km (81 mi) north-east of Esperance in 1991.

== Distribution and habitat ==
This geebung is only known from the type location and one other 8.5 km (5.3 mi) away, where it grows in heath in the south of Western Australia.
