= Persoonia inconspicua =

Scientific classification
- Kingdom: Plantae
- Clade: Tracheophytes
- Clade: Angiosperms
- Clade: Eudicots
- Order: Proteales
- Family: Proteaceae
- Genus: Persoonia
- Species: P. inconspicua

Binomial name
- Persoonia inconspicua P.H.Weston
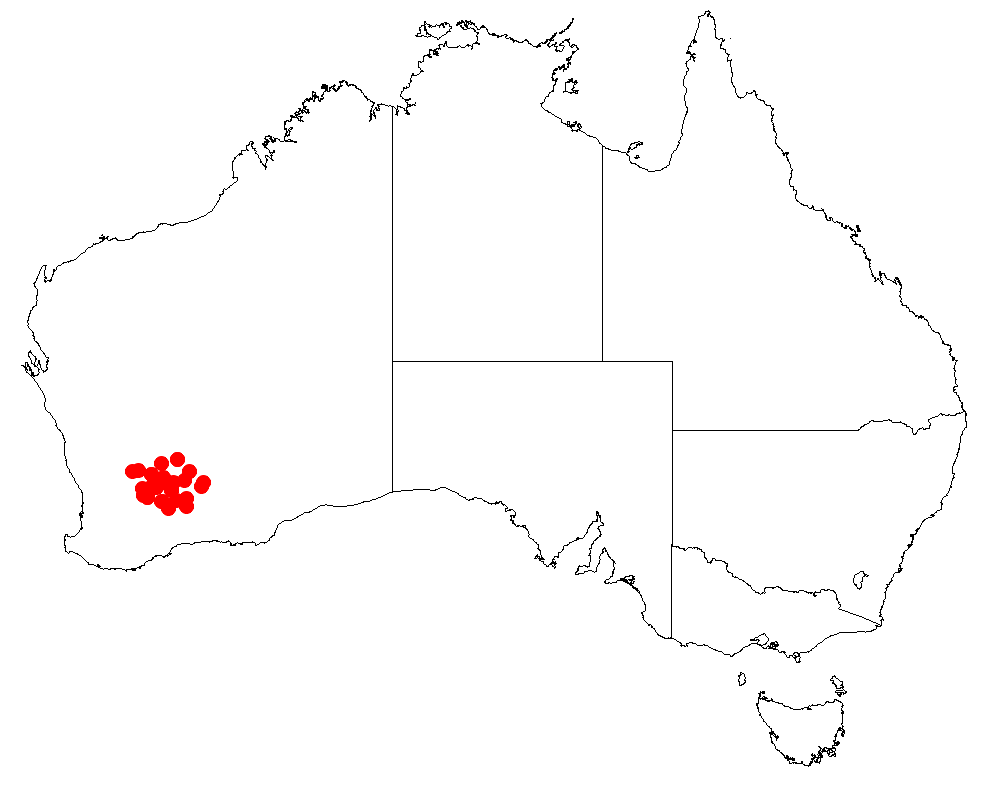
- Occurrence data from Australasian Virtual Herbarium

Species of flowering plant

Persoonia inconspicua is a species of flowering plant in the family Proteaceae and is endemic to the south-west of Western Australia. It is an erect, often spreading shrub with branchlets and leaves that are densely hairy when young, linear leaves and relatively small greenish yellow flowers usually borne singly or in pairs.

== Description ==
Persoonia inconspicua is an erect, often spreading shrub that typically grows to a height of 0.5–2.5 m (1 ft 8 in – 8 ft 2 in) with smooth bark and branchlets that are densely hairy for the first one or two years. The leaves are densely hairy when young, arranged alternately, linear, more or less cylindrical, 20–65 mm (0.79–2.56 in) long and 0.7–1.3 mm (0.028–0.051 in) wide and grooved on the lower surface. The flowers are usually borne singly or in pairs on a short rachis, each flower on a hairy pedicel 1–2.5 mm (0.039–0.098 in) long. The tepals are greenish yellow, hairy on the outside, 8–10.5 mm (0.31–0.41 in) long with white anthers that curve outwards near their tips. Flowering occurs from June to September and the fruit is a smooth drupe.

== Taxonomy ==
Persoonia inconspicua was first formally described in 1994 by Peter Weston in the journal Telopea from specimens collected by Paul Wilson north of Bullfinch in 1970.

== Distribution and habitat ==
This geebung usually grows in heath and woodland Cowcowing Lakes, Mt Jackson, Queen Victoria Rock and the Johnston Lakes, in the Avon Wheatbelt, Coolgardie and Mallee biogeographic regions.

== Conservation status ==
This species is classified as "not threatened" by the Western Australian Government Department of Parks and Wildlife.
