= Persoonia pentasticha =

Conservation status
- Priority Three — Poorly Known Taxa (DEC)

Scientific classification
- Kingdom: Plantae
- Clade: Tracheophytes
- Clade: Angiosperms
- Clade: Eudicots
- Order: Proteales
- Family: Proteaceae
- Genus: Persoonia
- Species: P. pentasticha

Binomial name
- Persoonia pentasticha P.H.Weston

Species of flowering plant

Persoonia pentasticha is a species of flowering plant in the family Proteaceae and is endemic to the south-west of Western Australia. It is an erect, spreading shrub with hairy young branchlets, linear leaves with five narrow, longitudinal grooves, and hairy yellow flowers borne in groups of up to fifteen on a rachis up to 45 mm (1.8 in) long.

== Description ==
Persoonia pentasticha is an erect, spreading shrub that typically grows to a height of 0.4–1.8 m (1 ft 4 in – 5 ft 11 in) with smooth bark and young branchlets that are covered with whitish, greyish or light brown hair when young. The leaves are linear, more or less cylindrical, 35–120 mm (1.4–4.7 in) long and 0.7–1.2 mm (0.028–0.047 in) wide with five narrow longitudinal grooves and a sharply pointed tip. The flowers are arranged in groups of up to fifteen along a rachis up to 45 mm (1.8 in) long, each flower sessile or on a pedicel up to 6 mm (0.24 in) long, with a scale leaf at the base. The tepals are hairy on the outside, 7–12 mm (0.28–0.47 in) long. Flowering occurs from August to November.

== Taxonomy ==
Persoonia pentasticha was first formally described in 1994 by Peter Weston in the journal Telopea from specimens collected by John Stanley Beard north of Wubin in 1963.

== Distribution and habitat ==
This geebung grows in sandy soil in heath the area between Mullewa, Mingenew, Wubin and Paynes Find in the south-west of Western Australia.

== Conservation status ==
Persoonia pentasticha is classified as "Priority Three" by the Government of Western Australia Department of Parks and Wildlife meaning that it is poorly known and known from only a few locations but is not under imminent threat.
