= Persoonia bowgada =

Scientific classification
- Kingdom: Plantae
- Clade: Tracheophytes
- Clade: Angiosperms
- Clade: Eudicots
- Order: Proteales
- Family: Proteaceae
- Genus: Persoonia
- Species: P. bowgada

Binomial name
- Persoonia bowgada P.H.Weston

Species of flowering plant

Persoonia bowgada is a species of flowering plant in the family Proteaceae and is endemic to the south-west of Western Australia. It is an erect to spreading shrub with smooth bark, more or less cylindrical leaves and yellow flowers in groups of up to ten on the ends of branches.

== Description ==
Persoonia bowgada is an erect to spreading shrub that typically grows to a height of 1–3.5 m (3 ft 3 in – 11 ft 6 in) and has smooth, mottled grey bark. The leaves are more or less cylindrical but with six narrow grooves and a sharply pointed tip, 50–110 mm (2.0–4.3 in) long and 0.7–1.3 mm (0.028–0.051 in) wide. The flowers are arranged in groups of up to ten on the ends of branchlets that continue to grow after flowering, each flower on a densely hairy pedicel 2.5–7 mm (0.098–0.276 in) long. The tepals are yellow, 11–15.5 mm (0.43–0.61 in) long, 2–2.5 mm (0.079–0.098 in) wide and densely hairy on the outside, the anthers yellow. Flowering occurs from October to November and the fruit is a smooth, narrow elliptic drupe, 10–14.5 mm (0.39–0.57 in) long and 4–7 mm (0.16–0.28 in) wide containing a single seed.

== Taxonomy and naming ==
Persoonia bowgada was first formally described in 1994 by Peter Weston in the journal Telopea from specimens collected by J.S. Beard north of the Murchison River in 1980. The specific epithet (bowgada) is a reference to the bowgada (Acacia ramulosa var. linophylla) community in which this species often occurs, and to the species' superficial similarity to the acacia.

== Distribution and habitat ==
This geebung grows in bowgada woodland, euycalypt woodland and mallee heath within 100 km (62 mi) of the coast between Shark Bay and the Murchison River in the south-west of Western Australia.

== Conservation status ==
Persoonia bowgada is classified as "not threatened" by the Western Australian Government Department of Parks and Wildlife.
