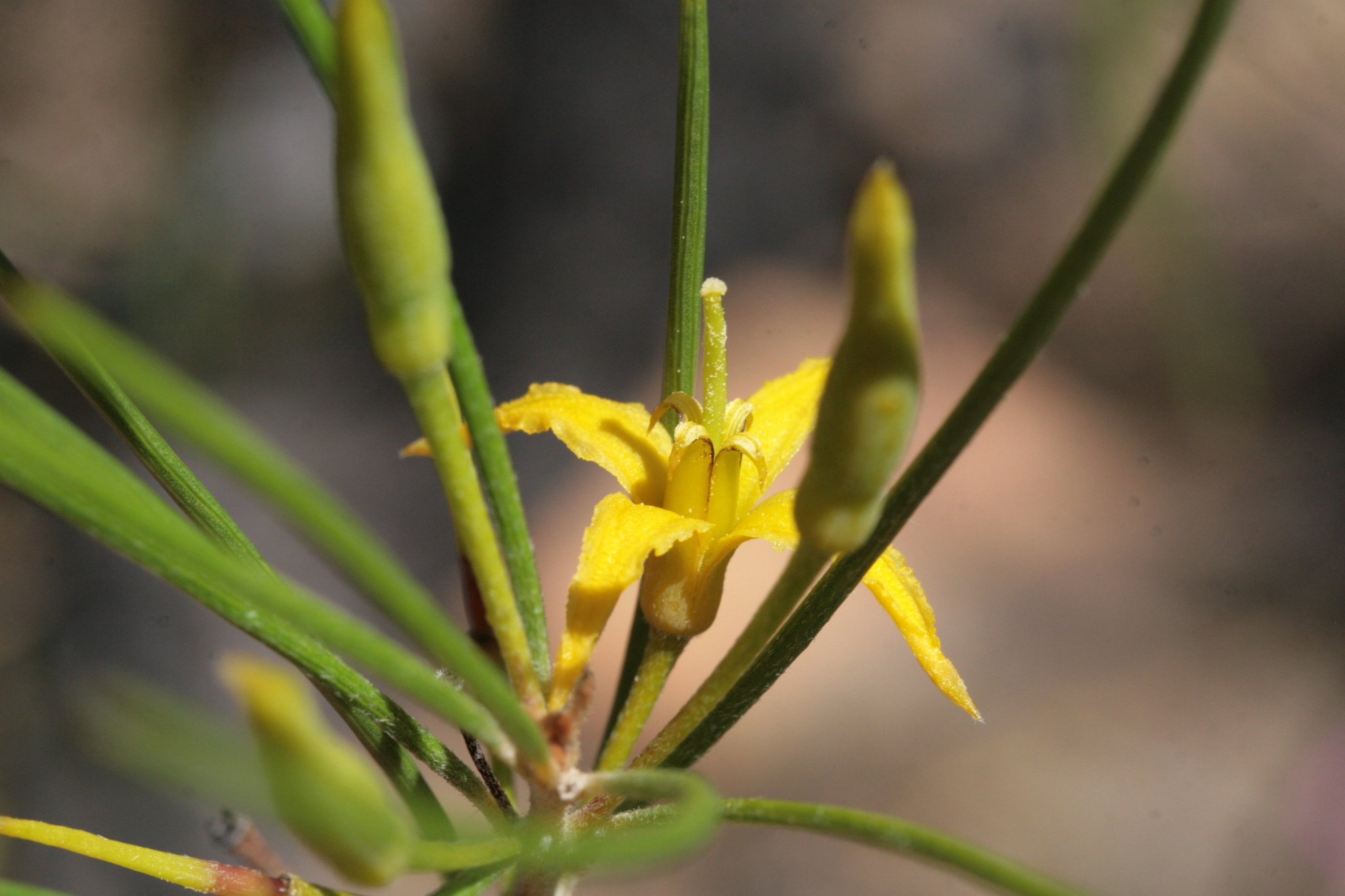

Scientific classification
- Kingdom: Plantae
- Clade: Tracheophytes
- Clade: Angiosperms
- Clade: Eudicots
- Order: Proteales
- Family: Proteaceae
- Genus: Persoonia
- Species: P. hexagona

Binomial name
- Persoonia hexagona P.H.Weston
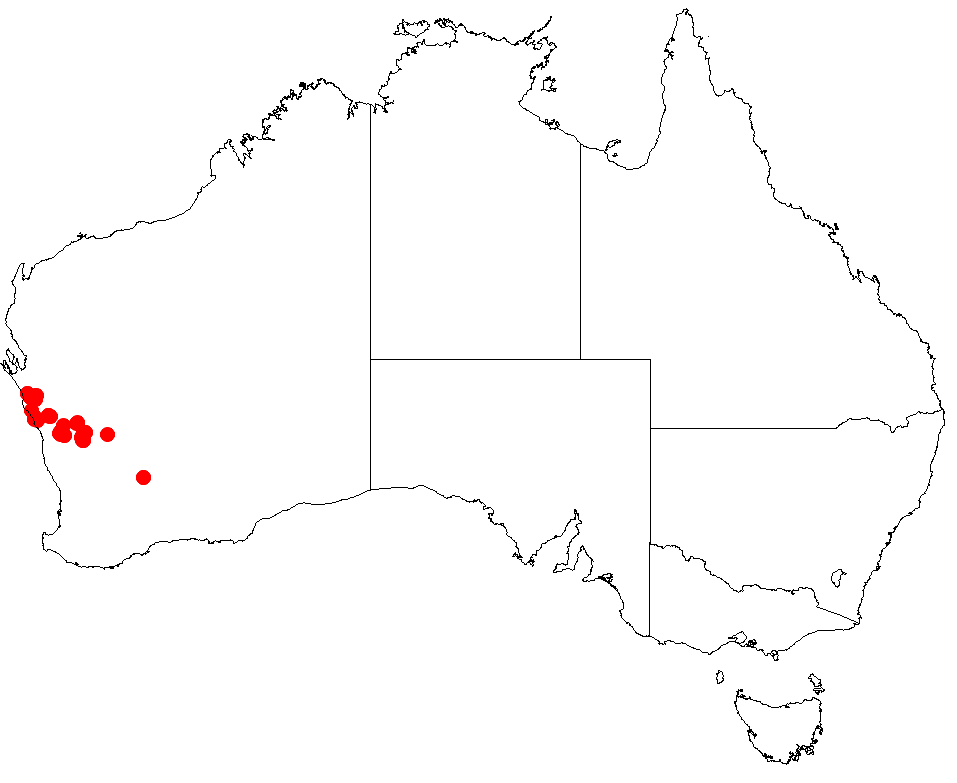
- Occurrence data from Australasian Virtual Herbarium

= Persoonia hexagona =

Species of flowering plant

Persoonia hexagona is a species of flowering plant in the family Proteaceae and is endemic to the south-west of Western Australia. It is an erect, spreading shrub with branchlets that are densely hairy when young, linear, sharply pointed leaves and bright yellow, hairy flowers borne singly or in groups of up to ten on a rachis up to 40 mm (1.6 in) long.

== Description ==
Persoonia hexagona is an erect, spreading shrub that typically grows to a height of 1–3.5 m (3 ft 3 in – 11 ft 6 in) with smooth bark and branchlets that are hairy for the first two or three years. The leaves are arranged alternately, mostly linear, more or less cylindrical, 50–130 mm (2.0–5.1 in) long and 0.7–1.3 mm (0.028–0.051 in) wide with six longitudinal ridges. The flowers are arranged singly or in groups of up to ten along a rachis up to 40 mm (1.6 in) long that usually grows into a leafy shoot after flowering, each flower on a pedicel 7.5–9 mm (0.30–0.35 in) long. The tepals are bright yellow, hairy on the outside, 10.5–20 mm (0.41–0.79 in) long with bright yellow anthers. Flowering occurs from November to December and the fruit is a smooth drupe.

== Taxonomy ==
Persoonia hexagona was first formally described in 1994 by Peter Weston in the journal Telopea from specimens he collected north-east of Perenjori in 1980.

== Distribution and habitat ==
This geebung usually grows in Acacia woodland and occurs from near the Murchison River to near Perenjori, in the Avon Wheatbelt, Geraldton Sandplains and Yalgoo biogeographic regions.

== Conservation status ==
This species is classified as "not threatened" by the Western Australian Government Department of Parks and Wildlife.
