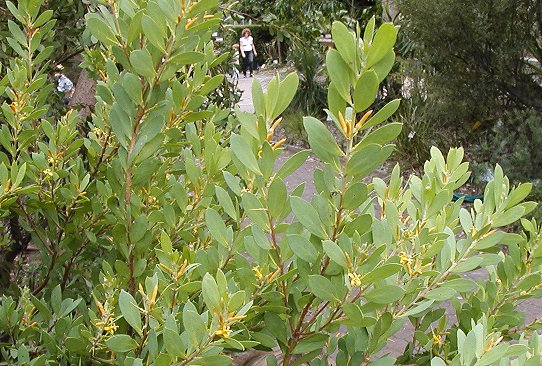

Conservation status
- Least Concern (IUCN 3.1)

Scientific classification
- Kingdom: Plantae
- Clade: Tracheophytes
- Clade: Angiosperms
- Clade: Eudicots
- Order: Proteales
- Family: Proteaceae
- Genus: Persoonia
- Species: P. lanceolata

Binomial name
- Persoonia lanceolata Andrews
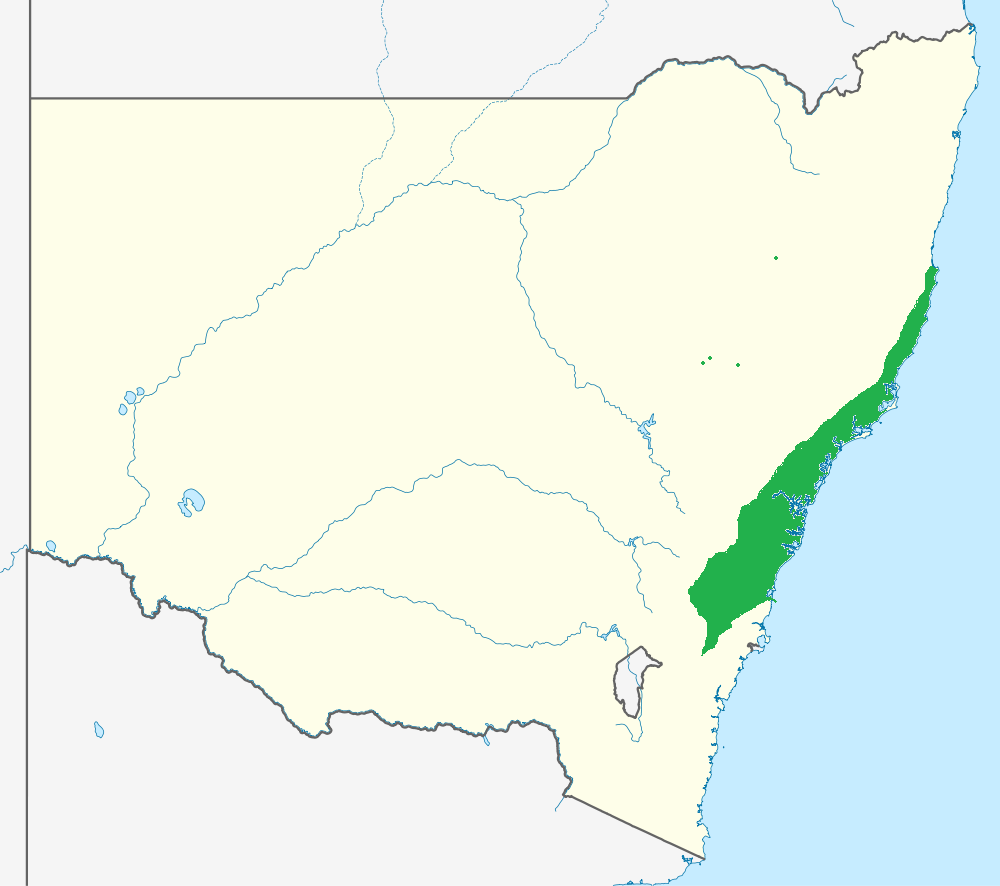
- Range of P. lanceolata in New South Wales

Synonyms
- Persoonia latifolia Andrews; Linkia lanceolata (Andrews) Kuntze

= Persoonia lanceolata =

Lance-leaf geebung

Species of shrub native to eastern Australia

Persoonia lanceolata, commonly known as lance-leaf geebung, is a shrub native to New South Wales in eastern Australia. It reaches 3 m (10 ft) in height and has smooth grey bark and bright green foliage. Its small yellow flowers grow on racemes and appear in the austral summer and autumn (January to April), followed by green fleshy fruits (known as drupes) which ripen the following spring (September to October). Within the genus Persoonia, P. lanceolata belongs to the lanceolata group of 58 closely related species. It interbreeds with several other species found in its range.

The species is usually found in dry sclerophyll forest on sandstone-based nutrient-deficient soil. It has adapted to a fire-prone environment; plants lost in bushfires can regenerate through a ground-stored seed bank. Seedlings mostly germinate within two years of fires. Several species of native bee of the genus Leioproctus pollinate the flowers. Swamp wallabies are a main consumer of its fruit, and the seeds are spread in wallaby faeces. Its lifespan ranges from 25 to 60 years, though difficulties in propagation have seen low cultivation rates.

== Taxonomy ==
Persoonia lanceolata was first collected at Botany Bay in April 1770, by Sir Joseph Banks and Daniel Solander, naturalists on the British vessel HMS Endeavour during Lieutenant (later Captain) James Cook's first voyage to the Pacific Ocean. Solander coined the (unpublished) binomial name Loranthoides angustifolius in Banks' Florilegium. It was officially described in 1799 by Henry Cranke Andrews from a plant grown from seeds by L. Wilson in Islington. Andrews also described some plants which he had grown from seed in a nursery in Hammersmith as P. latifolia, which turned out to be the same species. The specific epithet is the Latin word lanceolata, meaning "spear-shaped", and refers to the shape of the leaves. Lance-leaf geebung is the common name. The term geebung is derived from the Dharug language word geebung. German botanist Otto Kuntze coined the binomial name Linkia lanceolata in 1891, from Cavanilles' original description of the genus description Linkia, but the name was eventually rejected in favour of Persoonia. The horticulturist Joseph Knight described this species as the privet-like persoonia (Persoonia ligustrina) in his controversial 1809 work On the cultivation of the plants belonging to the natural order of Proteeae, but the binomial name was declared an illegitimate name as it postdated Andrews' description and name. Robert Brown used Andrews' name in his 1810 work Prodromus Florae Novae Hollandiae et Insulae Van Diemen.

In 1870, George Bentham published the first infrageneric arrangement of Persoonia in Volume 5 of his landmark Flora Australiensis. He divided the genus into three sections, placing P. lanceolata in P. sect. Amblyanthera. The genus was reviewed by Peter Weston for the Flora of Australia treatment in 1995, and P. lanceolata gave its name to the lanceolata group, a group of 58 closely related species with similar flowers but very different foliage. These species often interbreed with each other where two members of the group occur, and hybrids of P. lanceolata with P. katerae, P. levis, P. linearis, P. stradbrokensis and P. virgata have been recorded. The glaucous-leaved P. glaucescens was formerly considered a subspecies of P. lanceolata, but no intermediate forms have been recorded from where the two taxa grow together near Hill Top in the Southern Highlands. P. lanceolata has seven chromosomes, as do most other members of the genus, and they are large compared to those of other proteaceae.

== Description ==
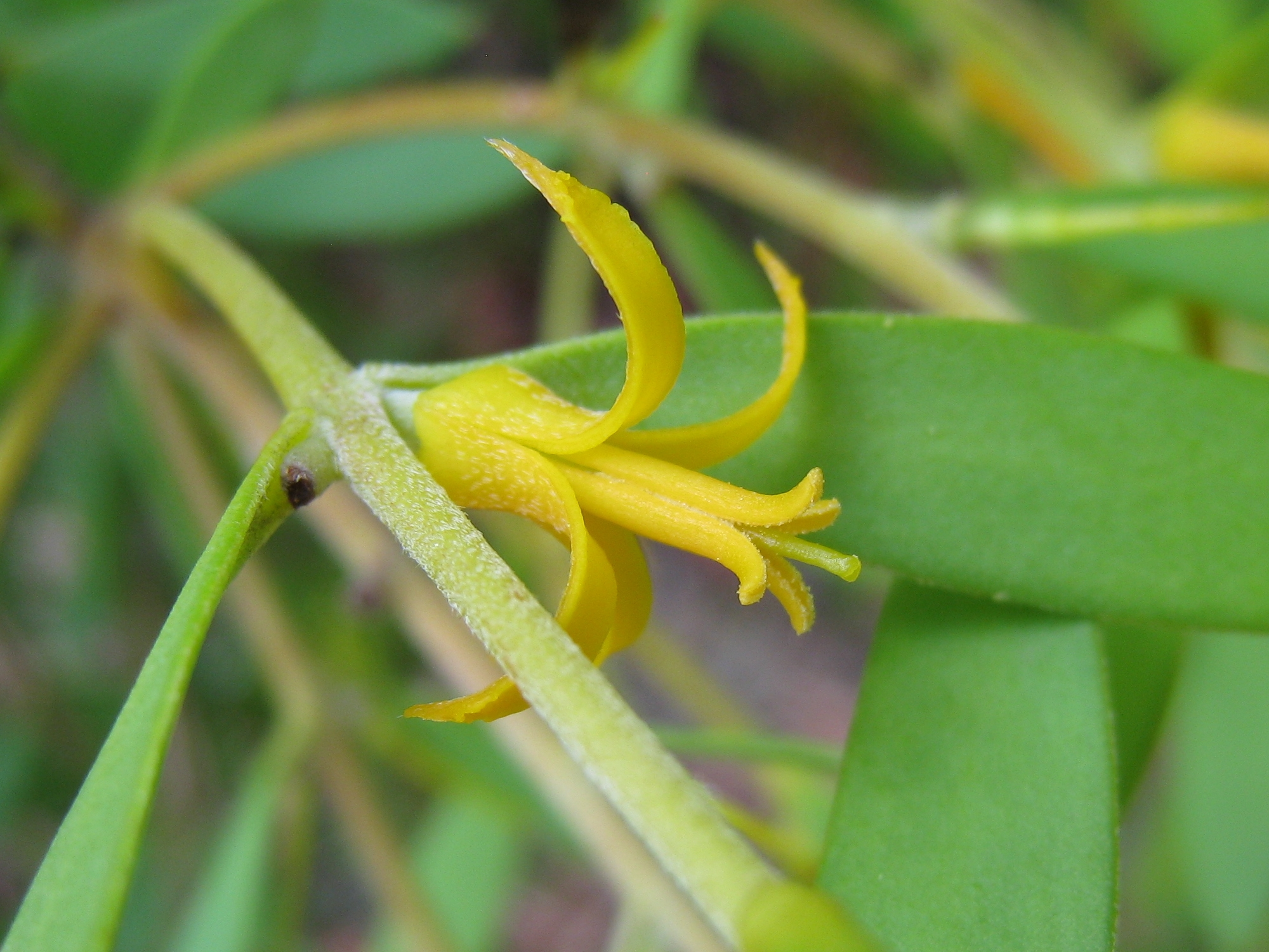
Individual flower, showing the outer tubular perianth splitting into four tepals, inside which an anther splits into four, around a central style tipped with a stigma

Persoonia lanceolata is a shrub which ranges from 0.5–3 m (1.6–9.8 ft) high. The grey bark is smooth, and the new growth is hairy. Arranged alternately on the stems, the thick leathery leaves are oblanceolate or obovate in shape, and measure 3–10 cm (1.2–3.9 in) in length, and around 0.4–3.2 cm (0.16–1.3 in) wide. Hairy when young, they are smooth and featureless. Bright green in colour with a yellowish tint at times, the leaves are concolorous, that is both leaf surfaces are the same colour. The finely hairy yellow flowers appear mainly from January to April, but may be encountered at any time of year. They are arranged in leafy racemes, and each stem may bear 4 to 54 flowers. P. lanceolata is described as auxotelic, which means each stalk bears an individual flower that is subtended by a leaf at its junction with the stem. On 0.5 cm (0.2 in) stalks, the flowers may reach 1 cm (0.4 in) in dimensions, and are typical for the genus.

Each individual flower consists of a cylindrical perianth which splits into four segments or tepals, and contains both male and female parts. Within this, the central style is surrounded by the anther, which splits into four segments; these curl back and resemble a cross when viewed from above. They provide a landing area for insects attending to the stigma, which is located at the tip of the style. The smooth fleshy drupes are green and more or less round, measuring 1 cm (0.4 in) by 0.8 cm (0.3 in) in diameter. Containing two seeds, they weigh around 1.3 g (0.05 oz) and become partly red as they ripen and fall to the ground the following spring (September to October). Once fallen to the ground, the drupes soften and become a dark red over two to three weeks before shrivelling and blackening. The drupes are edible and were eaten by the local aboriginal people.

The firm bark and lanceolate leaves of P. lanceolata distinguish it from P. levis, with which it can be confused; the latter species has flaky bark and asymmetrical leaves.

== Distribution and habitat ==
Persoonia lanceolata is found along coastal and near-coastal areas of New South Wales east of the Great Dividing Range, from Trial Bay on the Mid North Coast to Sassafras Morton National Park in the south. Its habitat extends to dry sclerophyll forest and heathland on sandstone-based soils low in nutrients, particularly on the tops of ridges and slopes. Examples in more sheltered areas are often taller than those in more exposed areas. P. lanceolata is found from sea level to an altitude of 700 m (2,300 ft), and the annual rainfall of the area it occurs in the Sydney Basin is 900–1,400 mm (35–55 in). The species is considered adequately protected in the Sydney region and is found in Bouddi, Brisbane Water, Marramarra, Ku-ring-gai Chase, Lane Cove, Sydney Harbour and Botany Bay National Parks. In heathland habitats, P. lanceolata grows with such species as Banksia ericifolia, B. oblongifolia and Darwinia fascicularis. In more forested areas it is an understory shrub alongside Lambertia formosa, Leptospermum trinervium, Daviesia corymbosa, Banksia serrata and B. ericifolia under such trees as Eucalyptus sclerophylla, E. piperita, E. sieberi, E. sparsifolia, E. punctata and Corymbia gummifera.

== Ecology ==
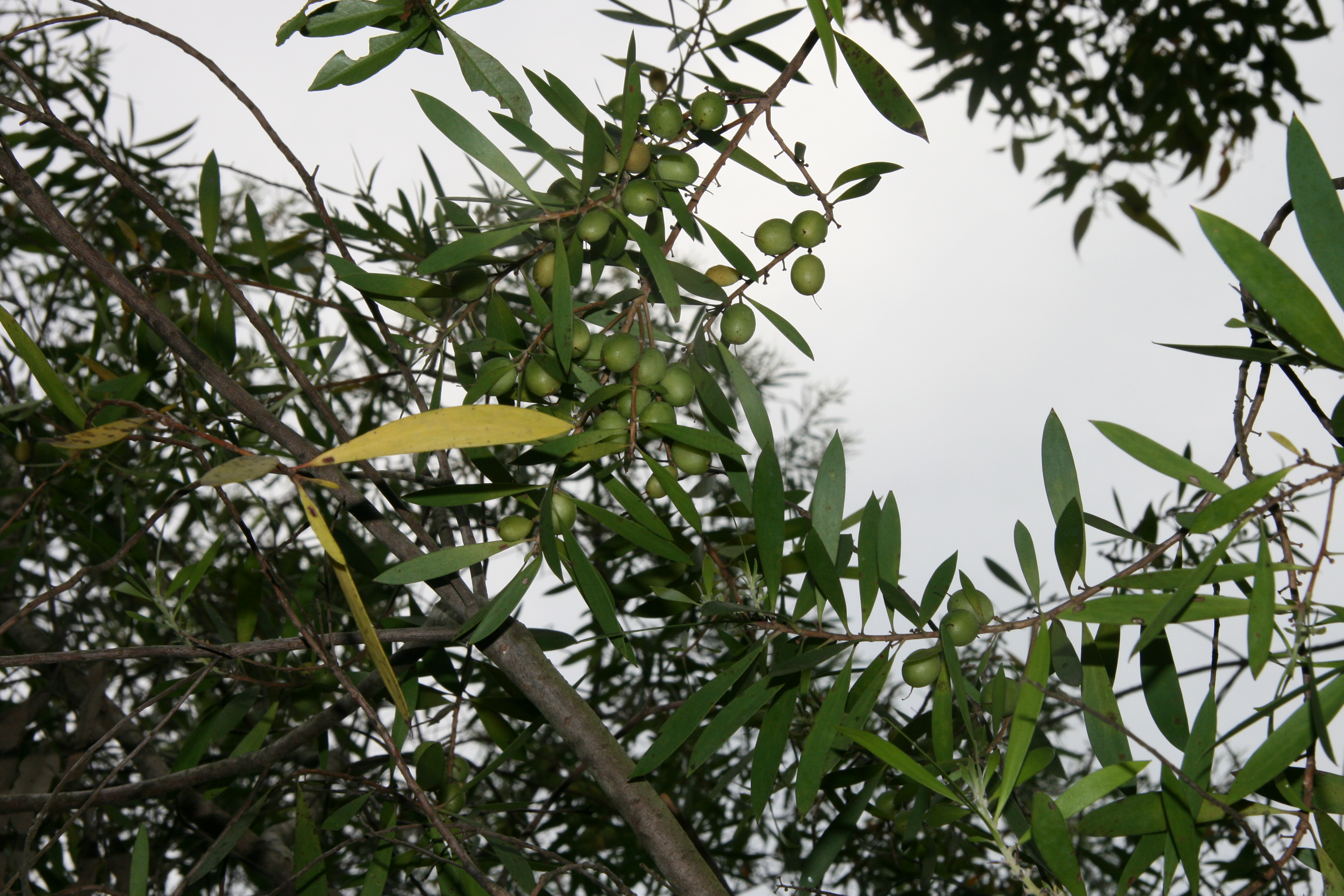
Developing drupes, Nannygoat Hill (Earlwood)

The swamp wallaby (Wallabia bicolor) feeds on the fallen fruit of P. lanceolata and disperses the seed through its scat (dung). A field study in Ku-ring-gai Chase National Park found that 88% of seeds in the scat were still viable although dormant. The red-necked wallaby (Macropus rufogriseus) feeds on drupes and is a likely seed dispersal agent. Animals can convey seed for one or two kilometres from where they have fed. Rodents such as the bush rat (Rattus fuscipes) and black rat (Rattus rattus) eat the drupes but chew the seed so that only fragments leave their digestive system. Foxes have been reported to eat the fruit, and kangaroos and large birds such as currawongs are thought to as well.

Colletid bees of the genus Leioproctus, subgenus Cladocerapis, forage exclusively on and pollinate flowers of many species of Persoonia. Bees of the subgenus Filiglossa in the same genus also feed only on Persoonia flowers but do not appear to be effective pollinators. Recorded species include the longtongue bees Leioproctus (Cladocerapis) carinatifrons, L. incanescens, and L. speculiferus, as well as Leioproctus filamentosa and Exoneura species. The European honeybee (Apis mellifera) is a common visitor to flowers, although its effectiveness as a pollinator is unclear. Persoonia lanceolata is an obligate outcrosser, that is, flowers need to be pollinated by pollen from other plants, and honeybees tend to forage more on different flowers of the same plant than between plants, as native bees do. Their abundance might be impacting the pollination success of native bees in this and other Persoonia species.

Infection by the fungal species Anthracostroma persooniae and Camarosporula persooniae results in leaf spot disease.

P. lanceolata shrubs destroyed by bushfire regenerate through seedlings surviving through seedbank in the soil. The Ku-ring-gai Chase study found that seedlings germinated within two years of a 1994 bushfire, although some appeared up to six years afterwards, while germination was not related to any particular season. Plants take six years to reach maturity. Thus, more frequent bushfires prevent recruitment and hence endanger populations. However, plants in Lane Cove National Park were recorded maturing three years after an especially intense bushfire. What triggers germination is unknown, and seedlings have also arisen from areas disturbed by sand mining, sometimes growing in higher concentrations than before the disturbance. The natural lifespan of a plant appears to range from 25 to 60 years.

== Cultivation and uses ==
Persoonia lanceolata is rarely seen in cultivation, mainly due to difficulties in propagation; seed germination is unpredictable, and cuttings have proven difficult to strike. Nevertheless, its bright green hue is considered an attractive horticultural feature. Well drained sandy soils in sun or part shade are needed for this plant in a garden setting. Once established, it tolerates moderate frosts and dry spells, and grows fairly readily in suitable conditions. Plantsmen in England were able to germinate seed there in 1791.

Drupes were eaten by indigenous people on the Beecroft Peninsula, and were preferred over those of P. laurina.
