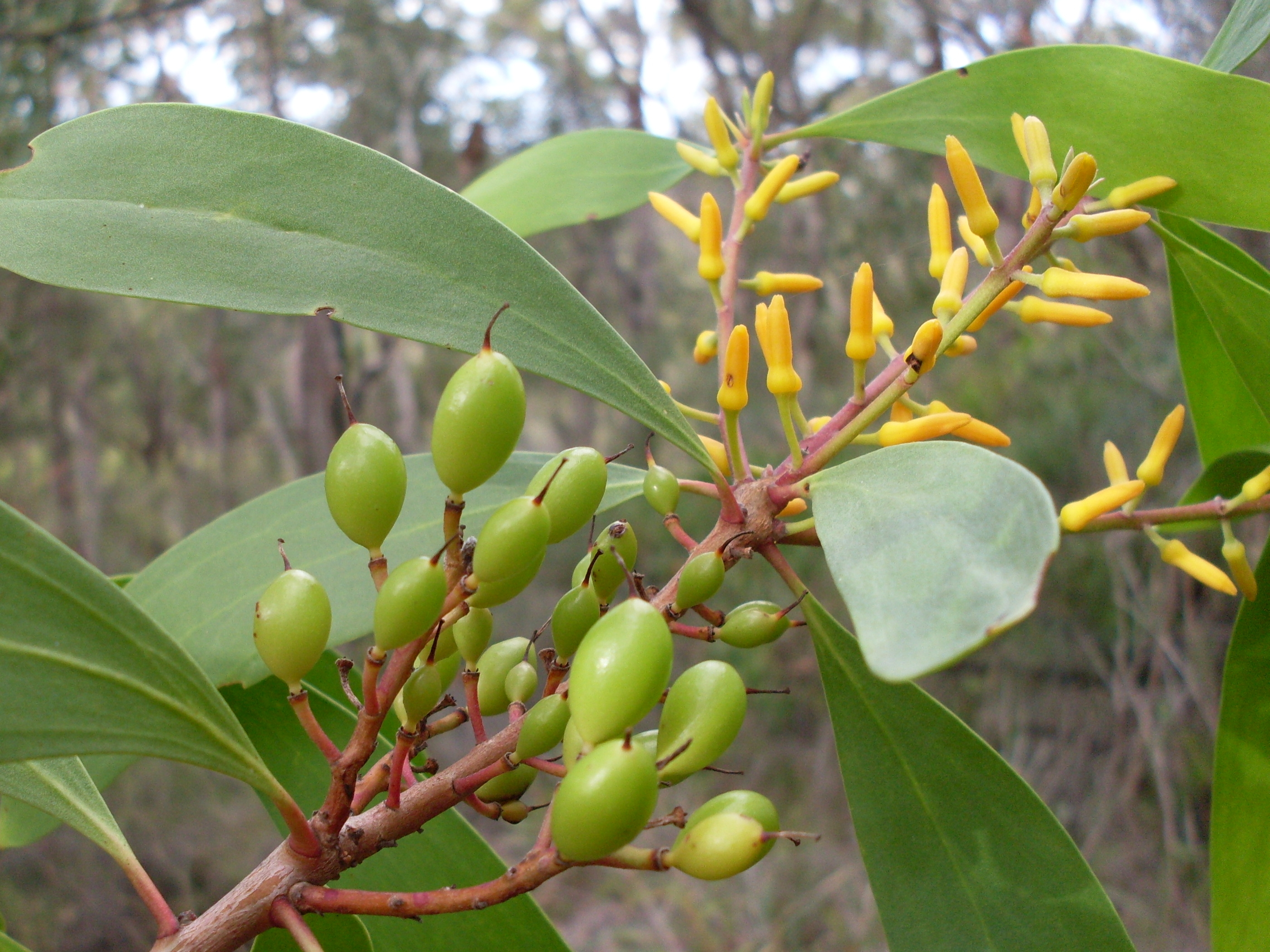

Conservation status
- Least Concern (IUCN 3.1)

Scientific classification
- Kingdom: Plantae
- Clade: Tracheophytes
- Clade: Angiosperms
- Clade: Eudicots
- Order: Proteales
- Family: Proteaceae
- Genus: Persoonia
- Species: P. levis

Binomial name
- Persoonia levis (Cav.) Domin
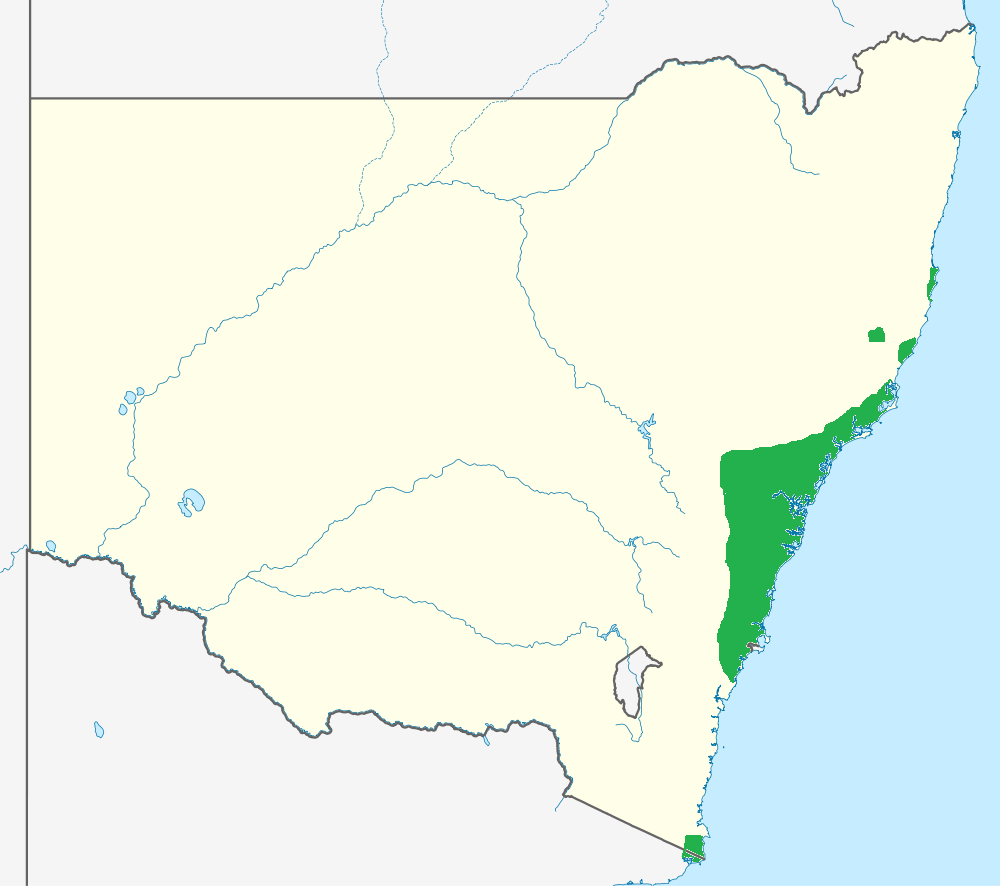
- Range of P. levis in New South Wales and extending into eastern Victoria

Synonyms
- Persoonia salicina Pers. Linkia levis Cav. Linkia salicina (Pers.) Kuntze

= Persoonia levis =

Broad-leaved geebung

Species of shrub native to Australia

Persoonia levis, commonly known as the broad-leaved geebung, is a shrub native to New South Wales and Victoria in eastern Australia. It reaches 5 m (16 ft) in height and has dark grey papery bark and bright green asymmetrical sickle-shaped leaves up to 14 cm (5.5 in) long and 8 cm (3.2 in) wide. The small yellow flowers appear in summer and autumn (December to April), followed by small green fleshy fruit, which are classified as drupes. Within the genus Persoonia, it is a member of the Lanceolata group of 58 closely related species. P. levis interbreeds with several other species where they grow together.

Found in dry sclerophyll forest on sandstone-based nutrient-deficient soils, P. levis is adapted to a fire-prone environment; the plants resprout epicormic buds from beneath their thick bark after bushfires, and can live for over 60 years. Regeneration also takes place after fire by a ground-stored seed bank. The longtongue bee Leioproctus carinatifrons is a pollinator of the flowers, and the fruit are consumed by vertebrates such as kangaroos, possums and currawongs. Despite its horticultural appeal, P. levis is rare in cultivation as it is very hard to propagate, either by seed or cuttings.

== Description ==
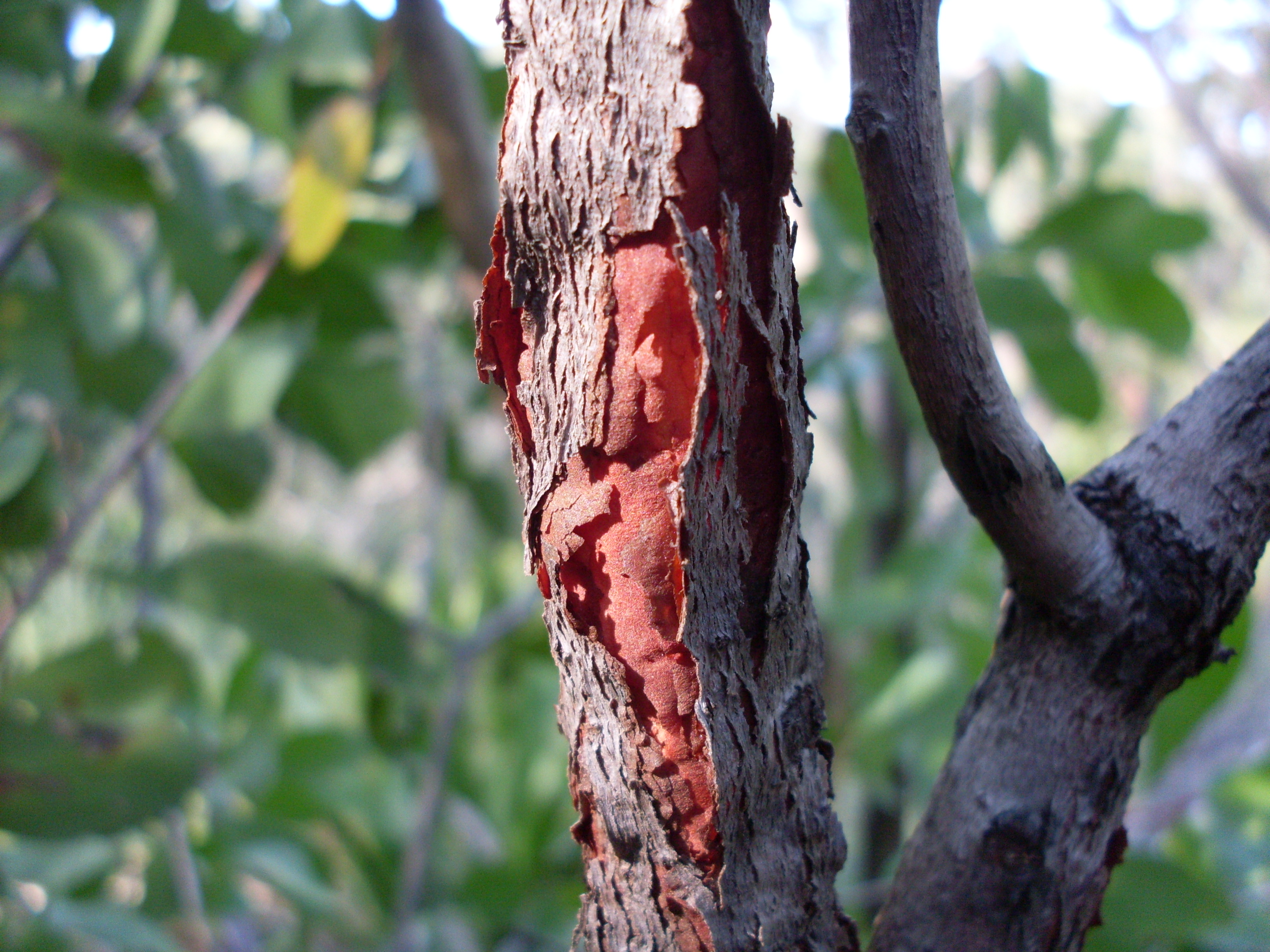
Flaky bark, with reddish layers beneath

Persoonia levis grows as a tall shrub to small tree, and can reach 5 m (16 ft) in height. The flaky soft bark is dark grey on the surface, while deeper layers are reddish in colour. Within the bark are epicormic buds, which sprout new growth after bushfire. The new growth is smooth to slightly hairy. The large green leaves measure 6 to 14 cm (2.2–5.5 in) in length, and 1.3 to 8 cm (0.5–3.2 in) in width, and are oblong or sickle-shaped (falcate). The asymmetrical shape helps distinguish the species from P. lanceolata. The bright green foliage, particularly of new growth, stands out against the more subdued tones of the surrounding vegetation and the stems, which are reddish in colour. The yellow flowers appear in summer and autumn (December to April), and peak over December to February. They are arranged on short axillary racemes along the branchlets. Each individual flower consists of a cylindrical perianth, consisting of tepals fused for most of their length, within which are both male and female parts. The central style is surrounded by the anther, which splits into four segments; these curl back and resemble a cross when viewed from above. They provide a landing area for insects attending to the stigma, which is located at the tip of the style. The smooth fleshy fruit, known as a drupe, is green and more or less round, measuring 1 cm (0.4 in) by 0.8 cm (0.3 in) in diameter. It contains two seeds, and has a spike at the end. The drupe is juicy but stringy when unripe, and the seeds and skin are inedible.

== Taxonomy and classification ==
Persoonia levis was first collected at Botany Bay in April 1770, by Sir Joseph Banks and Daniel Solander, naturalists on the British vessel HMS Endeavour during Lieutenant (later Captain) James Cook's first voyage to the Pacific Ocean. Solander coined the (unpublished) binomial name Loranthoides latifolius in Banks' Florilegium. It was formally described and given the name Linkia levis by Antonio José Cavanilles in 1798. His description was based on plant material collected by Luis Née in the vicinity of Port Jackson (Sydney) in April 1793 during the Malaspina Expedition. The species was placed in the genus Persoonia by Karel Domin in 1921. The genus names Linkia and Persoonia had been coined in 1798, but the latter was officially conserved. The species name is the Latin adjective levis, meaning "smooth", and refers to the hairless foliage. Christiaan Hendrik Persoon coined the name Persoonia salicina for it in his 1805 work Synopsis Plantarum, and queried whether Cavanilles' Linkia levis was in fact P. lanceolata. Robert Brown used Persoon's name in his 1810 work Prodromus Florae Novae Hollandiae et Insulae Van Diemen, and echoed Persoon's thoughts on Cavanilles' original name and specimen. In the 1995 Flora of Australia revision of the genus, Peter Weston reviewed the mounted material of Linkia levis, and found that Cavanilles had mounted material from both P. levis and P. lanceolata. He set one specimen of the three, which was clearly P. levis, as the lectotype, which aligned the material with the description. Common names include broad-leaved geebung, willow geebung and smooth geebung. The term geebung is derived from the Dharug language word geebung.

Like most other members of the genus, Persoonia levis has seven chromosomes that are large compared to those of other Proteaceae. In 1870, George Bentham published the first infrageneric arrangement of Persoonia in Volume 5 of his landmark Flora Australiensis. He divided the genus into three sections, placing P. levis (which he called P. salicina) in P. sect. Amblyanthera. The 1995 Flora of Australia revision of the genus saw it classified in the Lanceolata group, a group of 58 closely related species with similar flowers but very different foliage. These species will often interbreed with each other where two members of the group occur, and hybrids with P. acerosa, P. lanceolata, P. linearis, P. mollis subsp. ledifolia, P. myrtilloides subsp. myrtilloides (in the Upper Blue Mountains, these plants resemble P. lanceolata), P. oxycoccoides, and P. stradbrokensis have been recorded. Robert Brown initially described the hybrid with P. linearis as a species "Persoonia lucida", which is now known as Persoonia × lucida, and has been recorded from the southeast forests of the New South Wales south coast.

== Distribution and habitat ==
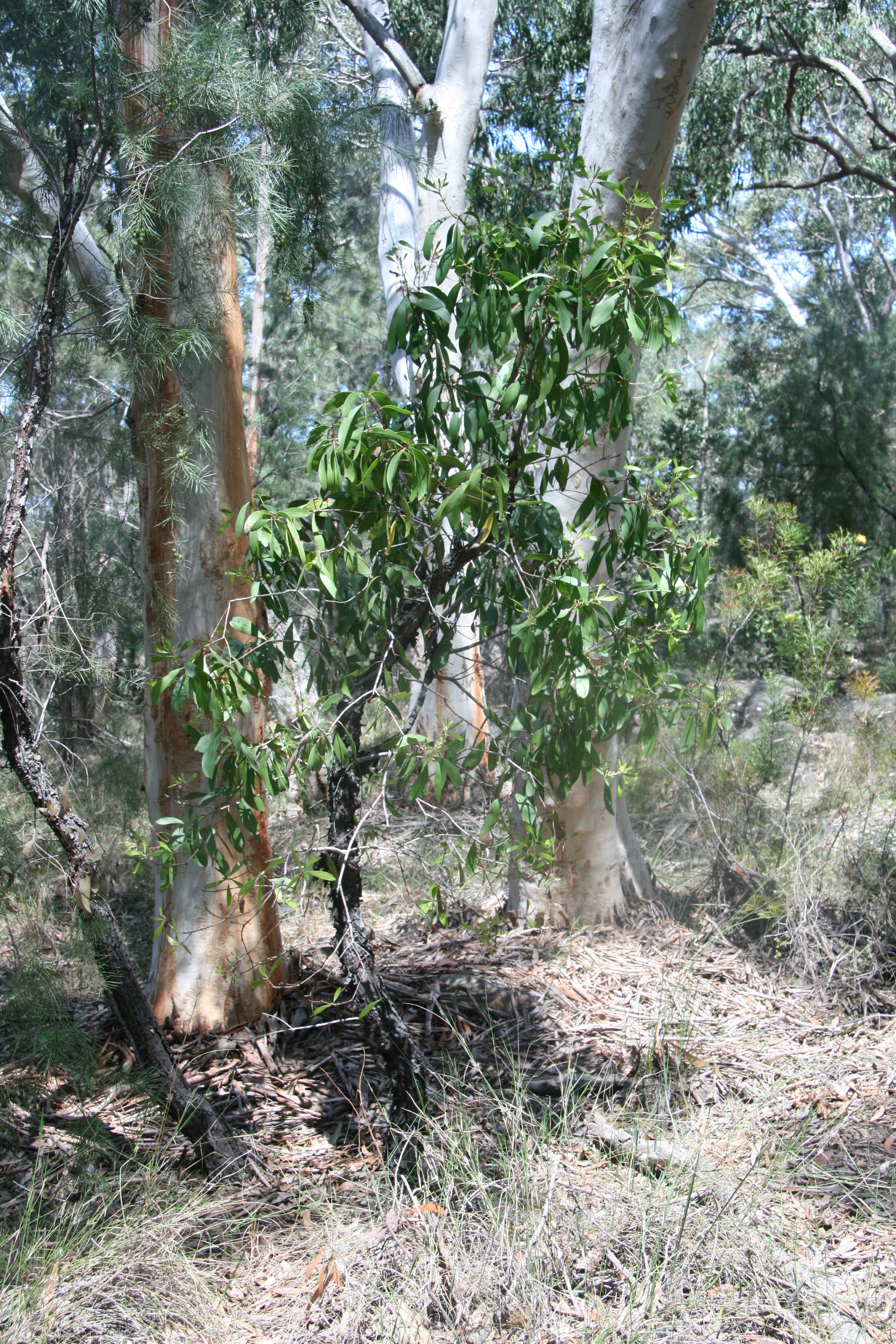
Habit, in open woodland, Georges River National Park

Persoonia levis is found from the Macleay River catchment on the New South Wales mid north coast to the Cann River in far eastern Victoria. It is found in dry sclerophyll forest on sandstone-based nutrient-deficient soils, from sea level to an altitude of 1000 m (3500 ft). There it grows in sunny or lightly shaded areas in open woodland, associated with such trees as Eucalyptus piperita, E. sieberi, E. sclerophylla, E. radiata, E. smithii, Angophora costata and Corymbia gummifera, and shrubs such as Conospermum longifolium, Grevillea buxifolia, G. phylicoides, Hakea laevipes, Symphionema montanum and Telopea speciosissima, as well as Persoonia hirsuta and P. mollis. Coastal forms are smaller with broader leaves than inland forms. The annual rainfall of the area it occurs in the Sydney Basin is 900–1,400 mm (35–55 in). It is considered adequately protected in the Sydney region, and is found in Georges River, Cattai, Wollemi, Bouddi, Brisbane Water, Marramarra, Ku-ring-gai Chase, Garigal, Lane Cove, Sydney Harbour, Botany Bay and Budderoo National Parks.

== Ecology ==
Persoonia levis is one of several species of Persoonia that regenerate by resprouting from the trunk after bushfire, an adaptation to the fire-prone habitat in which it grows. Its thick papery bark shields the underlying epicormic buds from the flames. Plants also regenerate by seedlings that arise from a seedbank in the soil after fire, although they may take up to 12 months to germinate. One study of sclerophyll forest unburnt for thirty years showed P. levis had declined over time. P. levis plants can live for over 60 years, and their leaves have a lifespan of up to 6 years.

Vesicles indicating a mycorrhizal association have been found on the roots of Persoonia levis, the Proteaceae not previously noted for forming mycorrhizal associations. Infection by the fungal species Anthracostroma persooniae results in leaf spot disease. P. levis is the food plant of the larvae of the weevil species Eurhynchus laevior.

Colletid bees of the genus Leioproctus subgenus Cladocerapis exclusively forage on and pollinate flowers of many species of Persoonia. Bees of subgenus Filiglossa in the same genus that also specialise in feeding on Persoonia flowers do not appear to be effective pollinators. Particular species recorded on P. levis include the longtongue bee Leioproctus carinatifrons. Weighing 1700 mg (0.60 oz), the fruit are adapted to be eaten by vertebrates, such as kangaroos and possums, as well as currawongs and other large birds. The flowers of P. levis are self-incompatible—that is, they are unable to fertilise themselves and require outcrossing to another plant.

== Cultivation ==
Persoonia levis is rarely seen in cultivation, mainly because of difficulties in propagation; seed germination is unpredictable, and cuttings have been nearly impossible to strike. Nevertheless, its colourful bark and leaves are attractive horticultural features. Well-drained sandy soils in sun or part shade are needed for the plant in a garden situation. Once established, it tolerates moderate frosts and dry spells and grows fairly readily, albeit slowly, in suitable conditions. Plantsmen in England germinated seed as early as 1795.
