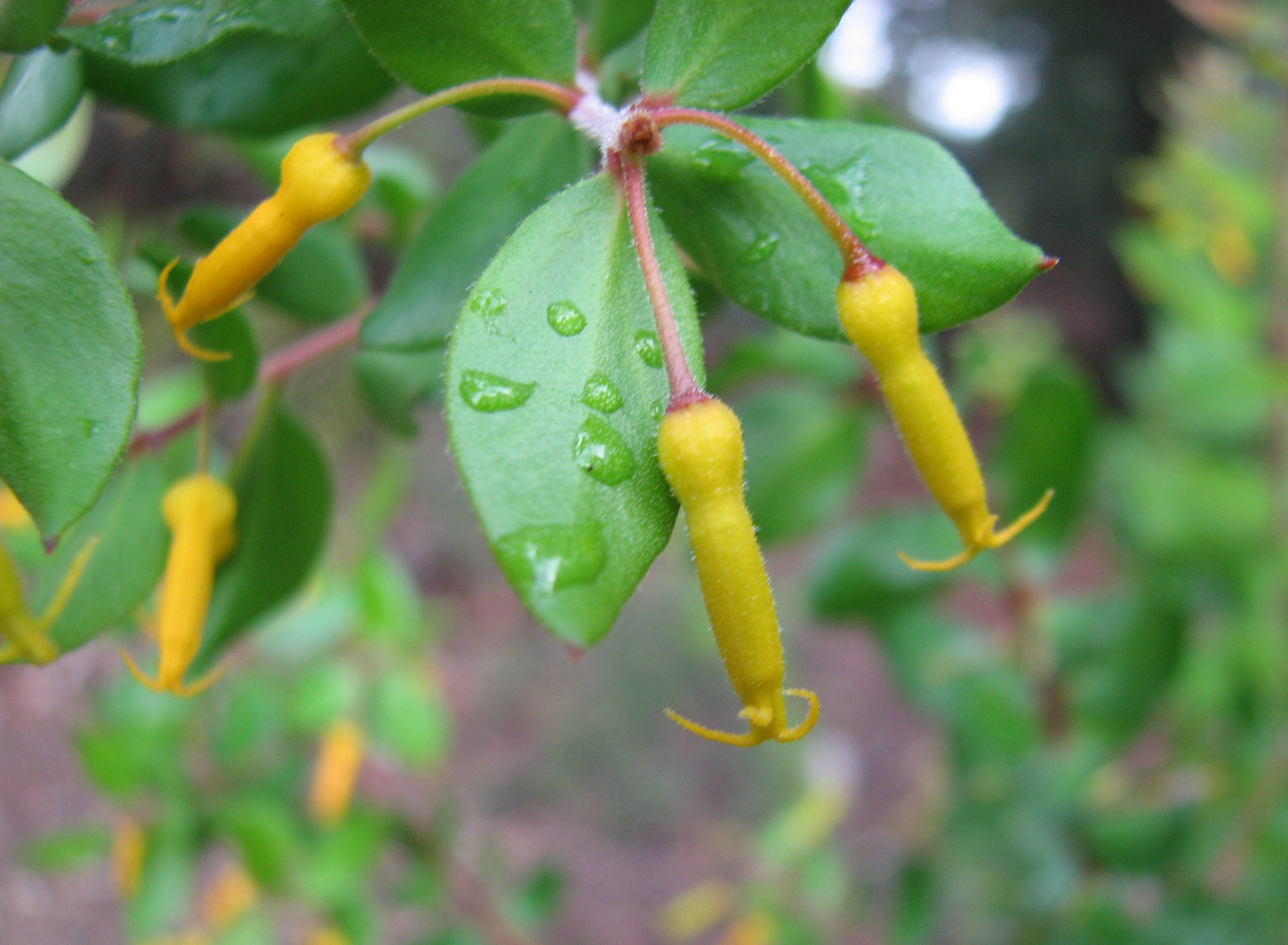
- In Maranoa Gardens

Scientific classification
- Kingdom: Plantae
- Clade: Tracheophytes
- Clade: Angiosperms
- Clade: Eudicots
- Order: Proteales
- Family: Proteaceae
- Genus: Persoonia
- Species: P. myrtilloides

Binomial name
- Persoonia myrtilloides Sieber ex Schult. & Schult.f.

Synonyms
- Linkia myrtilloides (Sieber ex Schultes & Schultes f.) Kuntze; Persoonia oleifolia Endl. nom. inval., pro syn.

= Persoonia myrtilloides =

Myrtle geebung

Species of flowering plant

Persoonia myrtilloides, commonly known as myrtle geebung, is a plant in the family Proteaceae and is endemic to New South Wales. It is an erect to spreading shrub with elliptic to egg-shaped leaves and yellow flowers in groups of up to forty on a rachis up to 170 mm (6.7 in) long.

== Description ==
Persoonia myrtillides is an erect to spreading shrub that typically grows to a height of 0.5–2.5 m (1 ft 8 in – 8 ft 2 in) and has hairy young branchlets. The leaves are elliptic to egg-shaped, 12–50 mm (0.47–1.97 in) long, 4–30 mm (0.16–1.18 in) wide and hairy when young. The flowers are arranged in groups of up to forty along a rachis up to 170 mm (6.7 in) long that grows into a leafy shoot after flowering. Each flower is on a pedicel 2–10 mm (0.079–0.394 in) long, usually with a leaf at the base. The tepals are yellow, 9–12 mm (0.35–0.47 in) long and hairy on the outside. Flowering occurs from December to April and the fruit is a green drupe tinged with purple.

== Taxonomy ==
Persoonia myrtilloides was first formally described in 1827 by Josef August Schultes and his son Julius Hermann Schultes from an unpublished description by Franz Sieber, and the description was published in Mantissa in volumen tertium.

Two subspecies of P. myrtilloides, subsp. myrtilloides and subsp. cunninghamii are accepted by the Australian Plant Census. In 1972, Noel Beadle, Obed Evans and Roger Carolin described subspecies myrtilloides in the book Flora of the Sydney Region, but at that stage no other subspecies had been described.

In 1830, Robert Brown described Persoonia cunninghamii in the supplement to his Prodromus from specimens collected in 1823 near Port Jackson by "D. Cunningham", then in 1991, Lawrie Johnson and Peter Weston reduced the species to Persoonia myrtilloides subspecies cunninghamii in the journal Telopea.

Persoonia myrtilloides subsp. cunninghamii (R.Br.) L.A.S.Johnson & P.H.Weston has narrow elliptic to lance-shaped leaves that are 20–50 mm (0.79–1.97 in) long and 4–12 mm (0.16–0.47 in) wide but P. myrtilloides Sieber ex Schult. & Schult.f. subsp. myrtilloides has leaves that are broadly elliptic to egg-shaped or lance-shaped 12–38 mm (0.47–1.50 in) long and 6–30 mm (0.24–1.18 in) wide.

Hybrids with P. acerosa, P. levis and P. recedens have been reported where the parent species occur together.

== Distribution and habitat ==
Myrtle geebung occurs in the Blue Mountains from Wentworth Falls northwards to Capertee. Subspecies cunninghamii is found in the Wollemi National Park and the catchment of the Cudgegong River.

Both subspecies are understory plants in open forests on sandstone-based soils. Subspecies myrtilloides is associated with trees such as Sydney peppermint (Eucalyptus piperita), narrow-leaved peppermint (E. radiata) and silvertop ash (E. sieberi), and in a shrubby understory of old man banksia (Banksia serrata), Phyllota squarrosa, paperbark teatree (Leptospermum trinervium) and mountain devil (Lambertia formosa). It is also found in heath. Subspecies cunninghamii is associated with the trees scribbly gum species Eucalyptus rossii and E. sclerophylla, rough-barked apple (Angophora floribunda), Callitris species, and mallees such as Eucalyptus multicaulis and narrow-leaved mountain mallee (E. apiculata).

Currawongs and possibly kangaroos and possums are thought to eat the fruit, the seeds of which are then scattered in droppings. Insects recorded foraging at flowers of subspecies myrtilloides include members of the genera Exoneura, Hylaeus and Odyneurus, Homalictus holochorus, colletid bees of the genus Leioproctus subgenus Cladocerapis, including Leioproctus carinatifrons, L. raymenti, L. speculiferus and Trigona carbonaria.
