= Grey spider flower =

Grey spider flower may refer to:

- Grevillea bracteosa, endemic to Western Australia
- Grevillea buxifolia, endemic to New South Wales
- Grevillea sphacelata, endemic to New South Wales
