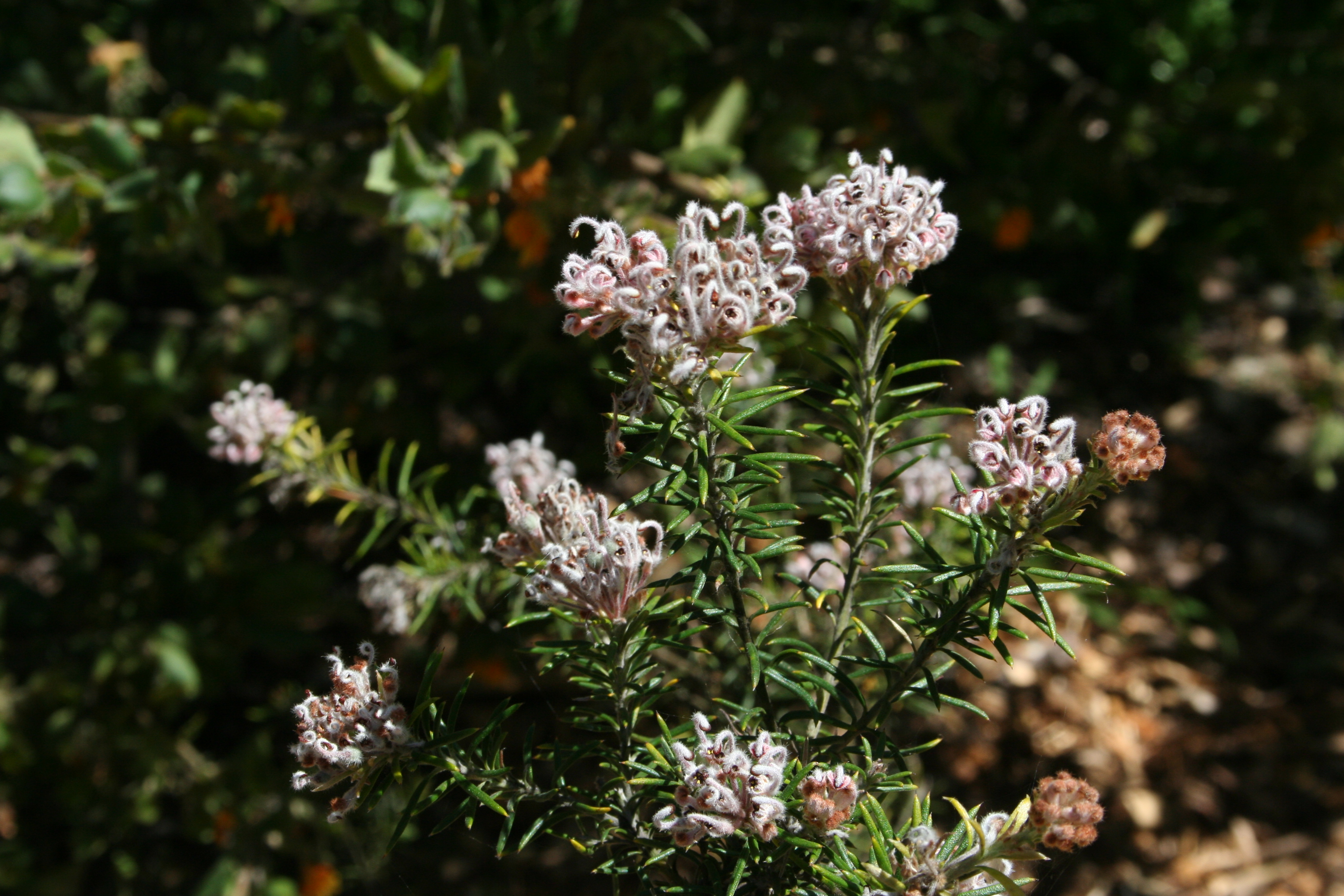
- In Hunter Region Botanic Gardens

Conservation status
- Least Concern (IUCN 3.1)

Scientific classification
- Kingdom: Plantae
- Clade: Embryophytes
- Clade: Tracheophytes
- Clade: Spermatophytes
- Clade: Angiosperms
- Clade: Eudicots
- Order: Proteales
- Family: Proteaceae
- Genus: Grevillea
- Species: G. acerata

Binomial name
- Grevillea acerata McGill.

= Grevillea acerata =

Species of plant endemic to New South Wales, Australia

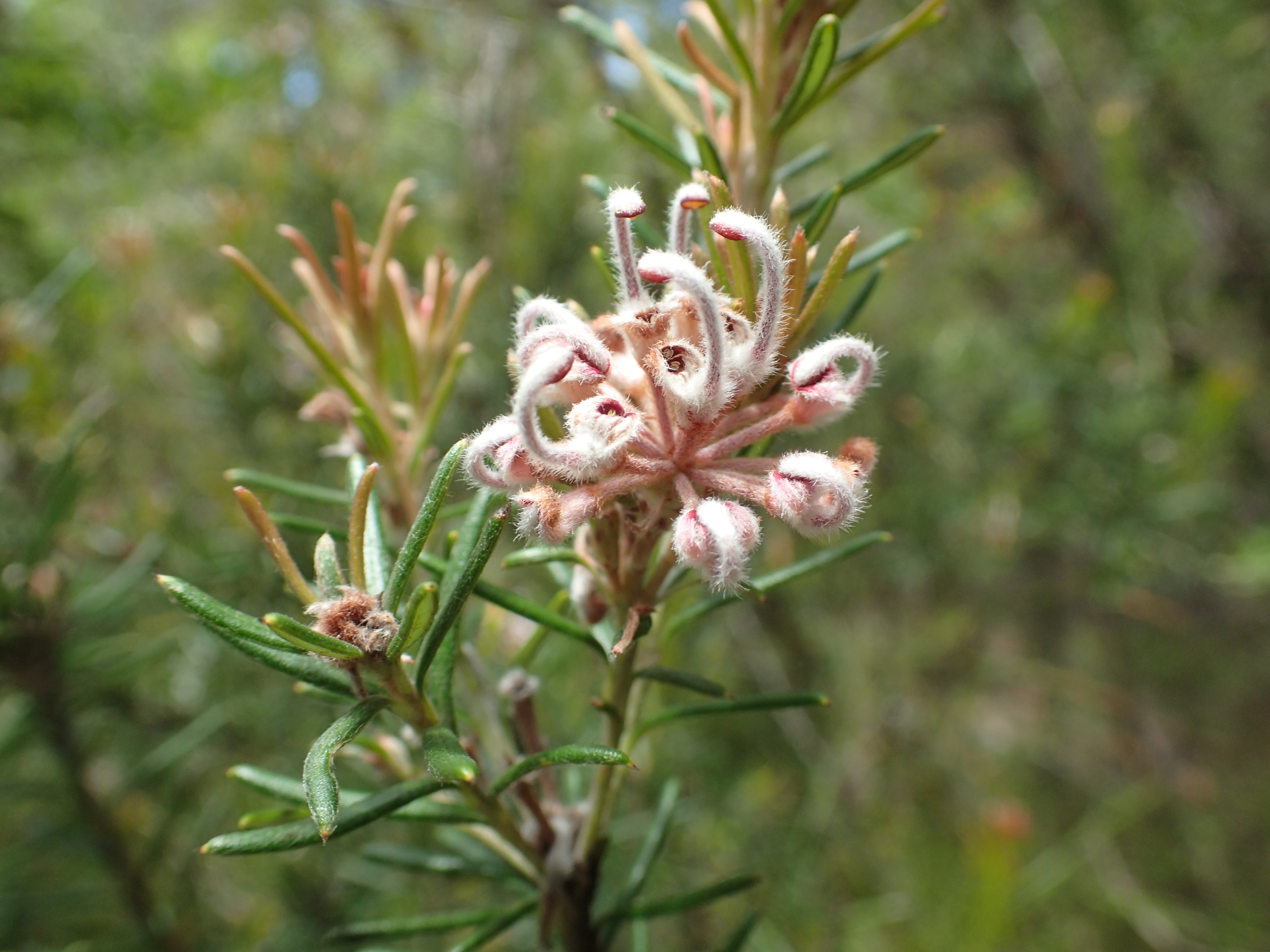
In the Gibraltar Range National Park

Grevillea acerata is a species of flowering plant in the family Proteaceae. It is endemic to New South Wales, Australia. It is a spreading shrub with more or less linear leaves and groups of woolly cream-coloured to grey flowers in groups on the ends of the branches. It is similar to Grevillea sphacelata and is only known from the Gibraltar Range National Park and nearby Glen Elgin.

== Description ==
Grevillea acerata is a spreading shrub which grows to a height of 0.6–1.3 m (2–4 ft) and has more or less linear leaves which are 10–30 mm (0.4–1 in) long and 1–2 m (3–7 ft) wide. The edges of the leaves are rolled under and partly or completely cover the lower surface which is covered with silky to woolly hairs. The flowers are arranged in more or less spherical groups 10–20 mm (0.4–0.8 in) in diameter on the ends of branches. The tepals are covered with woolly hairs which are grey to cream-coloured and rusty-coloured near the base of the flower. The pistil is 9–12 mm (0.4–0.5 in) long and hairy. Flowering occurs in spring and sporadically throughout the rest of the year. The fruit that follows is a hairy, oval-shaped, wrinkled follicle long.

This grevillea is similar to both G. sphacelata and G. buxifolia.

== Taxonomy and naming ==
Grevillea acerata was first formally described in 1986 by Donald McGillivray from a specimen collected in the Gibraltar Range National Park in 1973 by Mary Tindale. The description was published in McGillivray's book "New Names in Grevillea (Proteaceae)" . In older publications, it has been referred to as the northern type or northern race of Grevillea sphacelata.

The specific epithet (acerata) derives from the Greek a- (without) and -ceras (horned) and refers to the end of the style, which lacks the prominent 'horn' present in other related species such as Grevillea buxifolia.

== Distribution and habitat ==
This grevillea grows in woodland, forest and heath in soils derived from granite. It is only known from the Gibraltar Range National Park and nearby Glen Elgin in the Northern Tablelands of New South Wales.

== Conservation status ==
Grevillea acerata is listed as least concern on the IUCN Red List of Threatened Species. Despite its limited range, there are no major threats within Gibraltar Range National Park and its population is presumed to be stable. However, it is likely that inappropriate fire regimes pose a minor threat to the species.
