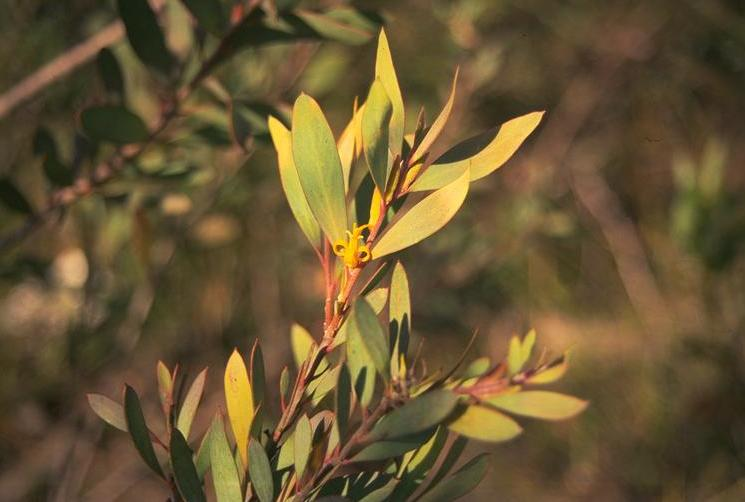

Conservation status
- Endangered (IUCN 3.1)

- Vulnerable (EPBC Act)

Scientific classification
- Kingdom: Plantae
- Clade: Tracheophytes
- Clade: Angiosperms
- Clade: Eudicots
- Order: Proteales
- Family: Proteaceae
- Genus: Persoonia
- Species: P. glaucescens

Binomial name
- Persoonia glaucescens Sieber ex Spreng.

Synonyms
- Persoonia glaucescens Sieber ex Schult. & Schult.f. nom. illeg., nom. superfl.; Persoonia lanceolata subsp. B; Persoonia lanceolata var. glaucescens (Sieber ex Spreng.) Endl.

= Persoonia glaucescens =

Species of flowering plant

Persoonia glaucescens, commonly known as the Mittagong geebung, is a species of flowering plant in the family Proteaceae and is endemic to New South Wales. It is an erect shrub with smooth bark, hairy young branchlets, lance-shaped leaves with the narrower end towards the base, and yellow flowers. It is the only persoonia in eastern Australia with strongly glaucous leaves.

== Description ==
Persoonia glaucescens is an erect shrub that typically grows to a height of 0.5–1.6 m (1 ft 8 in – 5 ft 3 in), sometimes to 3 m (9.8 ft), with smooth bark, brownish red branches and branchlets that are covered with greyish hairs when young. The leaves are narrow spatula-shaped to lance-shaped with the narrower end towards the base, strongly glaucous, especially when young, 30–80 mm (1.2–3.1 in) long, 4–18 mm (0.16–0.71 in) wide and twisted through 90° at the base. The flowers are arranged in groups of up to thirty along a rachis up to 190 mm (7.5 in) long, each flower on a hairy pedicel 1–3 mm (0.039–0.118 in) long. The tepals are yellow, 11–12 mm (0.43–0.47 in) long and sparsely to moderately hairy on the outside. Flowering occurs from January to May and the fruit is a fleshy green drupe with purple markings, and contain a single seed. This species is the only persoonia in eastern Australia to have strongly glaucous leaves.

== Taxonomy ==
Persoonia glaucescens was first formally described in 1827 by Kurt Polycarp Joachim Sprengel in the 17th edition of Systema Vegetabilium from an unpublished description by Franz Sieber. In 1848, Stephan Endlicher reduced the species to a variety as Persoonia lanceolata var. glaucescens.

Lawrie Johnson originally thought that P. lanceolata and the present species grew in separate areas, and gave it the name Persoonia subsp. B, but more recent fieldwork by Peter Weston showed that they do sometimes grow together without appearing to interbreed. As a result, Weston reinstated the name P. glaucescens, publishing the change in the journal Telopea.

Within the genus, P. glaucescens is classified in the Lanceolata group, a group of 58 closely related species with similar flowers but very different foliage. These species will often interbreed with each other where two members of the group occur.

== Distribution and habitat ==
Mittagong geebung occurs in small scattered patches in an area bordered by Buxton to the north and Berrima to the south, having vanished from the vicinities of Thirlmere Lakes and Fitzroy Falls. It grows on clay and gravel soils over laterite on upper slopes and ridges, at altitudes between 400 and 650 m (1,310 and 2,130 ft). It is found in dry sclerophyll eucalypt forest with such trees as red bloodwood (Corymbia gummifera), scribbly gum (Eucalyptus sclerophylla), Sydney peppermint (E. piperita), silvertop ash (E. sieberi), narrow-leaved stringybark (E. sparsifolia), grey gum (E. punctata) and, at higher elevations, snow gum (E. pauciflora). The increased light and lack of competing plants means the species adapts preferably to (and can be found on) road verges.

== Conservation status ==
Persoonia glaucescens is listed as "endangered" on the IUCN Red List of Threatened Species and as "endangered" under the New South Wales Government Biodiversity Conservation Act 2016 and as "vulnerable" under the Australian Government Environment Protection and Biodiversity Conservation Act 1999. The main threats to the species include trail and road maintenance, inappropriate fire regimes and grazing.
