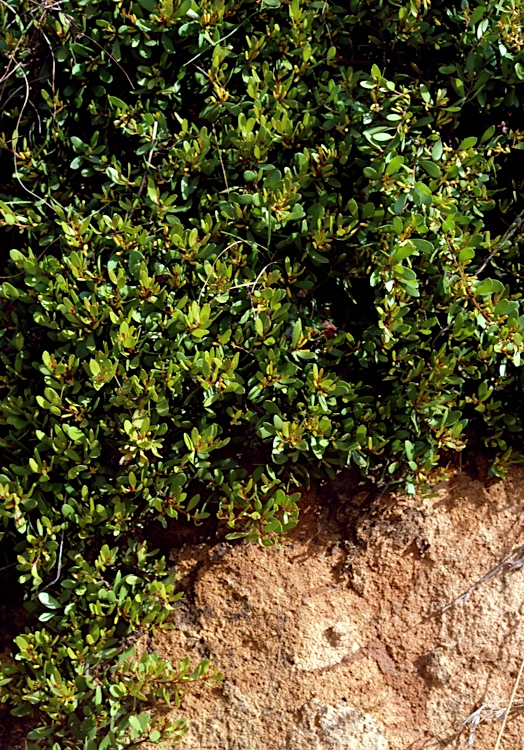

Conservation status
- Extinct (EPBC Act)

Scientific classification
- Kingdom: Plantae
- Clade: Tracheophytes
- Clade: Angiosperms
- Clade: Eudicots
- Order: Proteales
- Family: Proteaceae
- Genus: Persoonia
- Species: †P. prostrata

Binomial name
- †Persoonia prostrata R.Br.

Synonyms
- Linkia prostrata (R.Br.) Kuntze

= Persoonia prostrata =

Species of flowering plant

Persoonia prostrata is a plant in the family Proteaceae and is endemic to the northern tip of K'gari in Queensland, but is presumed to be extinct. It is similar to Persoonia stradbrokensis but is a prostrate shrub with smaller leaves and flowers.

== Description ==
Persoonia prostrata is a prostrate shrub with elliptic to spatula-shaped leaves 23–50 mm (0.91–1.97 in) long and 12–24 mm (0.47–0.94 in) wide. The flowers are arranged along a rachis up to 6 mm (0.24 in) long, that continues to grow after flowering, each flower with a scale leaf at its base. The tepals are about 10 mm (0.39 in) long. The species is only known from two collections and may be of a prostrate form of P. stradbrokensis, although that species has not been found on K'gari.

== Taxonomy ==
Persoonia prostrata was first formally described in 1810 by Robert Brown in Transactions of the Linnean Society of London from specimens he collected near the coast of Sandy Cape in 1802.

== Distribution and habitat ==
This geebung is only known from the Brown's type collection and another collected near the end of the 19th century, both from Sandy Cape on Fraser Island, where it grew on sand dunes in heath, woodland or forest.

== Conservation status ==
Persoonia prostrata is classified as "extinct" under the Australian Government Environment Protection and Biodiversity Conservation Act 1999 and as "extinct in the wild" under the Queensland Government Nature Conservation Act 1992.
