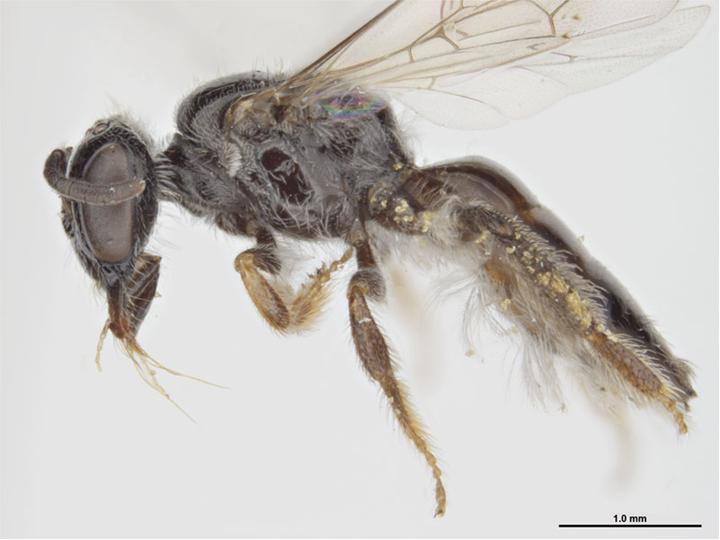
- Female

Scientific classification
- Kingdom: Animalia
- Phylum: Arthropoda
- Clade: Pancrustacea
- Class: Insecta
- Order: Hymenoptera
- Family: Colletidae
- Genus: Leioproctus
- Species: L. prolatus

Binomial name
- Leioproctus prolatus Maynard 1994

= Leioproctus prolatus =

Species of bee

Leioproctus prolatus, or Leioproctus (Filiglossa) prolatus, is a species of bee in the family Colletidae and subfamily Colletinae. It is endemic to Australia. It was described by Australian entomologist Glynn Maynard in 1994.

== Etymology ==
The specific epithet prolatus (Latin: "elongated") is an anatomical reference to the elongated labial palps.

== Description ==
Female body length is 4.5 mm. Integumental colouration is mainly black.

== Distribution and habitat ==
The species occurs in Queensland. The type locality is the Beerburrum to Woodford Road, in the Sunshine Coast Region.

== Behaviour ==
The adults are flying mellivores. Flowering plants visited by the bees include Persoonia virgata.

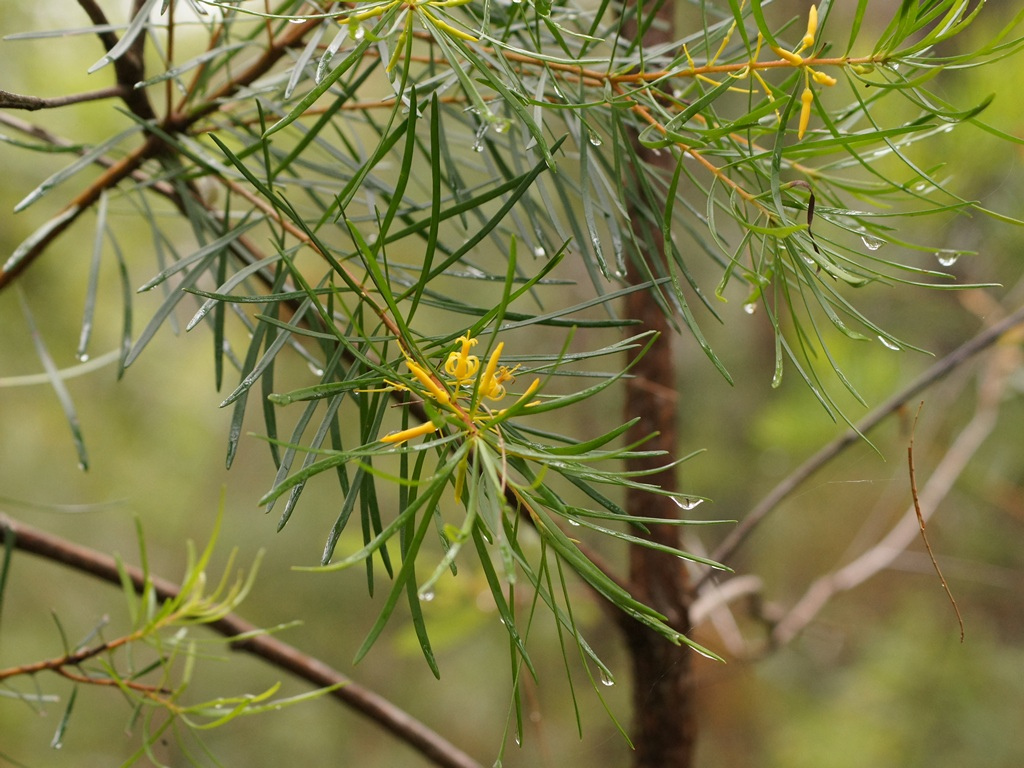
Persoonia virgata, a forage plant of the bees
