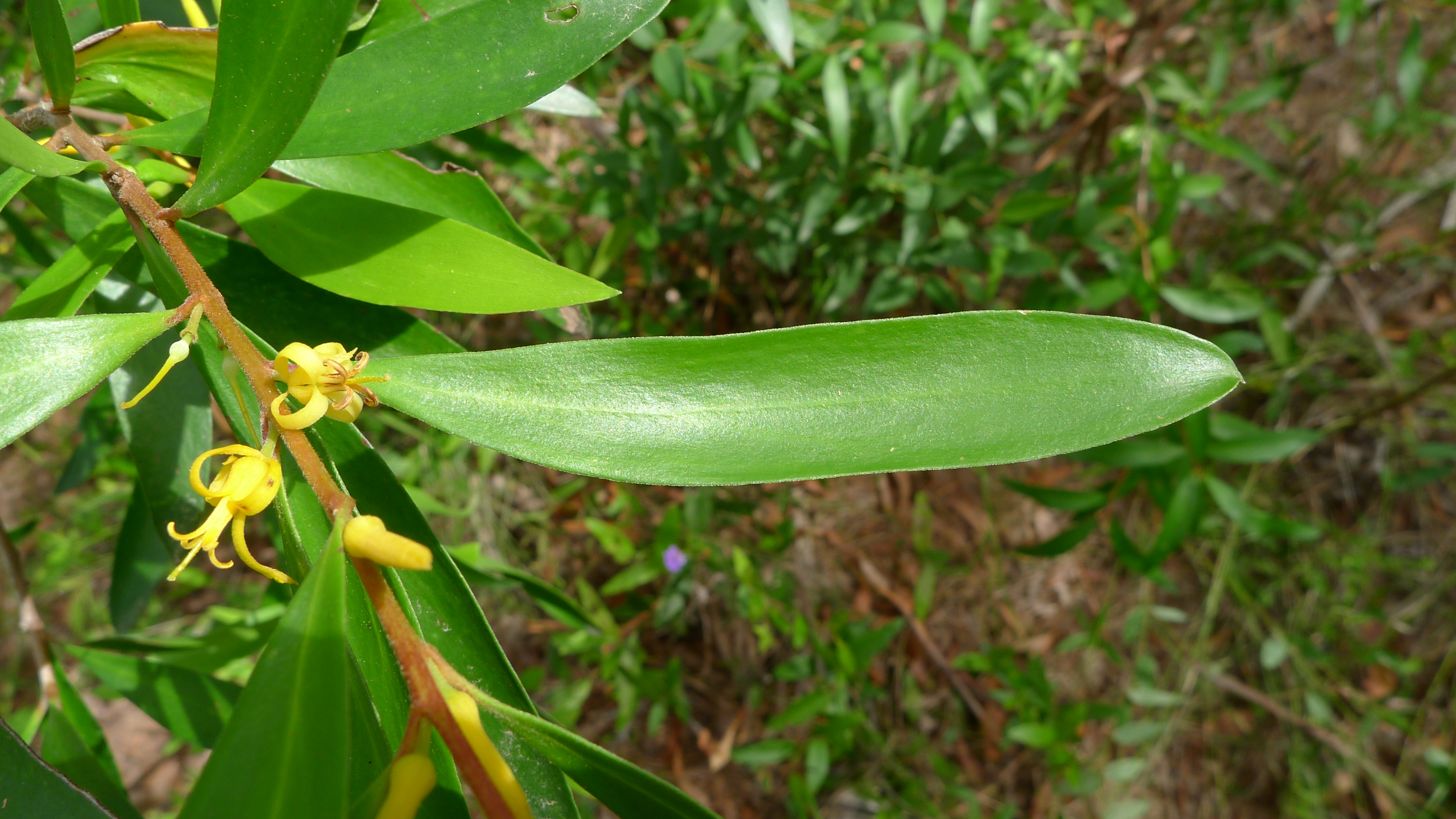
- In the Koonyum Range near Mullumbimby

Scientific classification
- Kingdom: Plantae
- Clade: Tracheophytes
- Clade: Angiosperms
- Clade: Eudicots
- Order: Proteales
- Family: Proteaceae
- Genus: Persoonia
- Species: P. adenantha

Binomial name
- Persoonia adenantha Domin
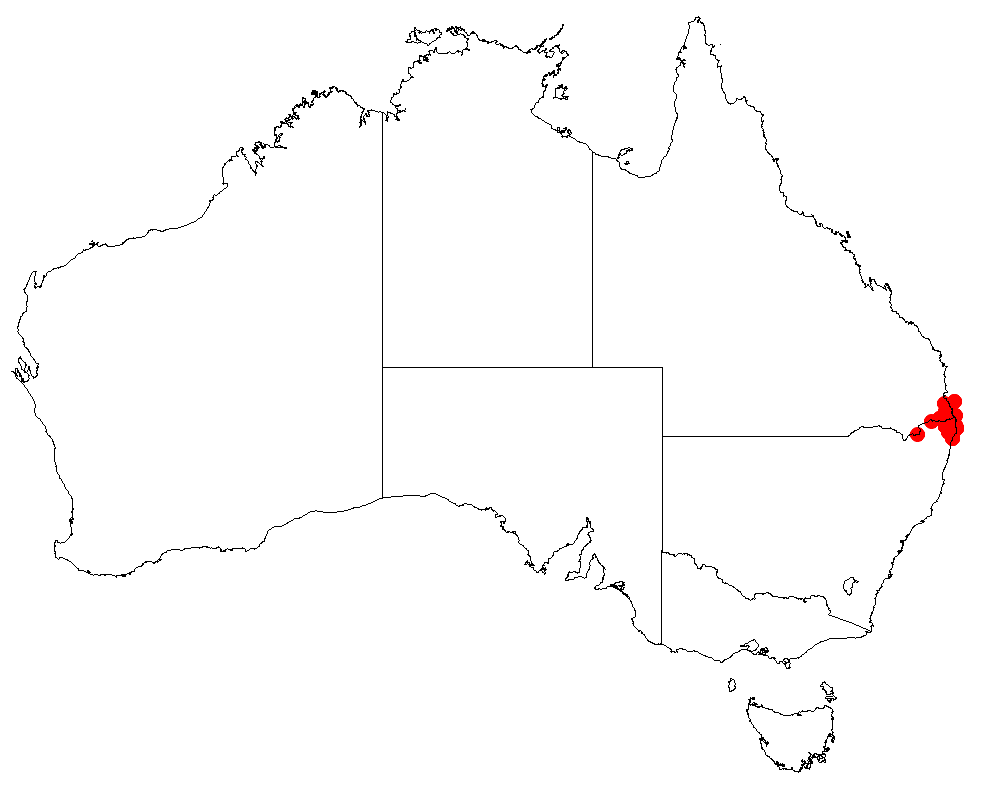
- Occurrence data from Australasian Virtual Herbarium

= Persoonia adenantha =

Species of shrub

Persoonia adenantha is a plant in the family Proteaceae and is endemic to eastern Australia. It is an upright shrub or small tree with smooth, elliptic to lance-shaped leaves and groups of hairy yellow flowers. It has sometimes been confused with P. cornifolia and P. stradbrokensis.

== Description ==
Persoonia adenantha is an upright shrub or small tree which grows to a height of 2.5–9 m (8–30 ft) and has hairy young branches while its older stems are covered with smooth bark. The leaves are flat, narrow elliptic to lance-shaped with the edges turned down. They are 30–140 mm (1–6 in) long, 6–30 mm (0.2–1 in) wide and are hairy when young but glabrous when mature. The flowers are yellow and arranged in groups, each flower with an erect, hairy pedicel 1–4 mm (0.04–0.2 in). The flower is composed of four tepals 10–13 mm (0.4–0.5 in) long, which are fused at the base but with the tips rolled back. The tepals have a distinct, pointed tip on the end. The central style is surrounded by four yellow anthers which are also joined at the base with the tips rolled back, so that it resembles a cross when viewed end-on. Flowering occurs from November to April and is followed by fruit which are green drupes.

This persoonia has been known as Persoonia cornifolia subsp. B and sometimes intergrades with P. stradbrokensis near Casino.

== Taxonomy and naming ==
Persoonia adenantha was first formally described by Czech botanist Karel Domin in 1921 from a specimen collected in forest near the Logan River. The description was published in the journal Bibliotheca Botanica. The specific epithet (adenantha) means "gland-flowered".

== Distribution and habitat ==
This persoonia grows in heath, forest and rainforest between Pimpama and Tamborine Mountain in south-east Queensland and south to Evans Head in New South Wales.

== Cultivation ==
Persoonia adenantha has horticultural potential as a formal or informal hedging plant. Plants require good drainage to grow well in gardens.
