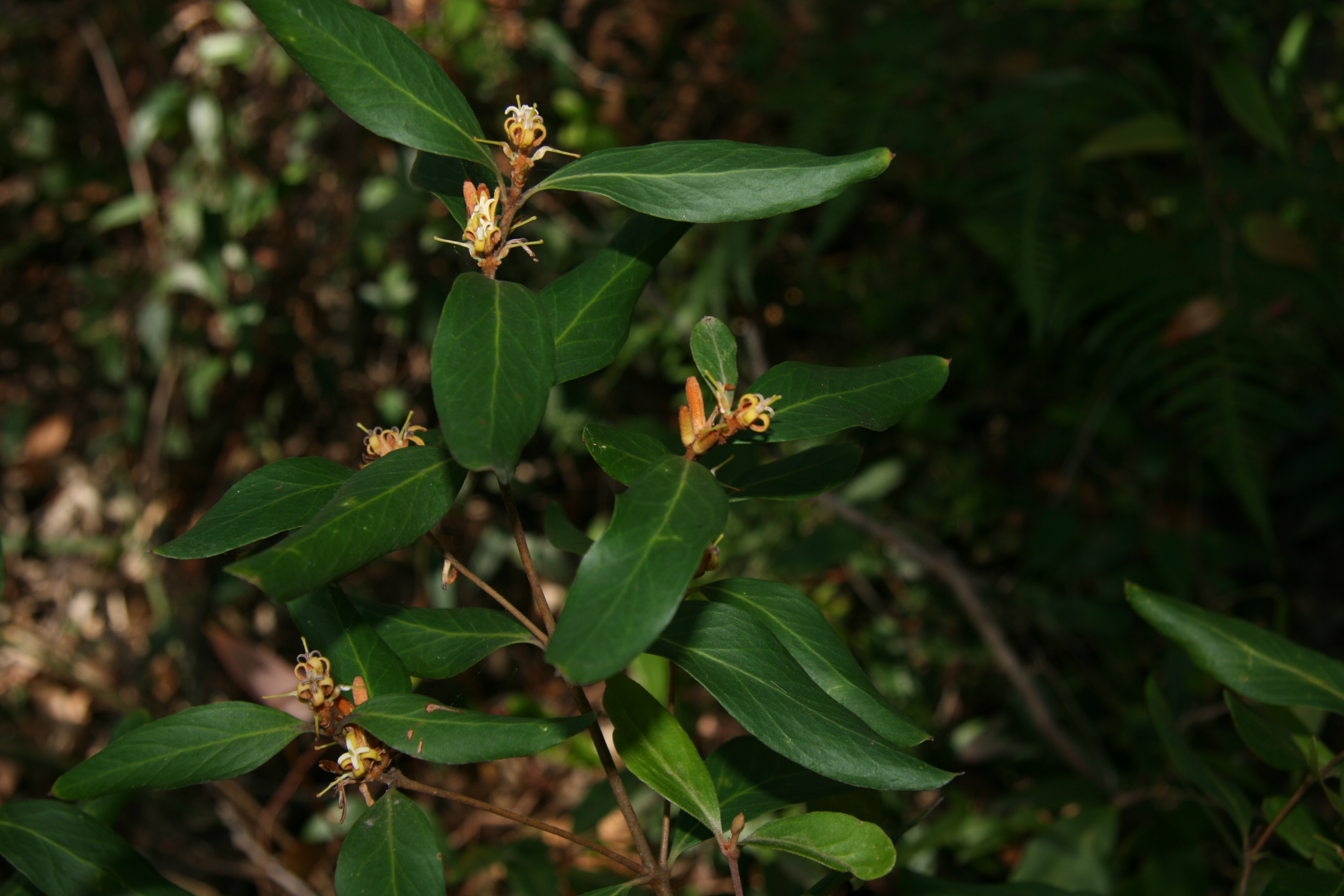

Scientific classification
- Kingdom: Plantae
- Clade: Tracheophytes
- Clade: Angiosperms
- Clade: Eudicots
- Order: Proteales
- Family: Proteaceae
- Genus: Persoonia
- Species: P. laurina

Binomial name
- Persoonia laurina Pers.

Synonyms
- Persoonia ferruginea Sm. Persoonia monticola Gand. Persoonia maidenii Gand.

= Persoonia laurina =

Laurel geebung

Species of shrub

Persoonia laurina, commonly known as the laurel-leaved or laurel geebung, is a shrub of the family Proteaceae native to central New South Wales in eastern Australia. Found in sclerophyll forest, it grows to a height of 2 metres (6 ft 7 in). The yellow flowers appear in late spring.

== Taxonomy ==
Persoonia laurina was one of five species described by Christiaan Hendrik Persoon in his 1805 work Synopsis Plantarum, from material collected by John White in 1793 and 1794. The species name refers to a resemblance to Laurus "laurel". James Edward Smith described this species as the rusty persoonia (Persoonia ferruginea) in his 1805 book Exotic Botany. The horticulturist Joseph Knight used Smith's name in his controversial 1809 work On the cultivation of the plants belonging to the natural order of Proteeae, as did Robert Brown in his 1810 work Prodromus Florae Novae Hollandiae et Insulae Van Diemen. Brown also recognised that the two names were the same species.

In 1870, George Bentham published the first infrageneric arrangement of Persoonia in Volume 5 of his landmark Flora Australiensis. He divided the genus into three sections, placing P. ferruginea in P. sect. Amblyanthera.

Within the genus, P. laurina is classified in the Laurina group, a group of three species from southeastern Australia that all have a lignotuber.

Three subspecies are recognised. First recorded as distinct in 1981, they were officially described as subspecies in 1991 by Lawrie Johnson and Peter Weston of the New South Wales Herbarium.

== Description ==
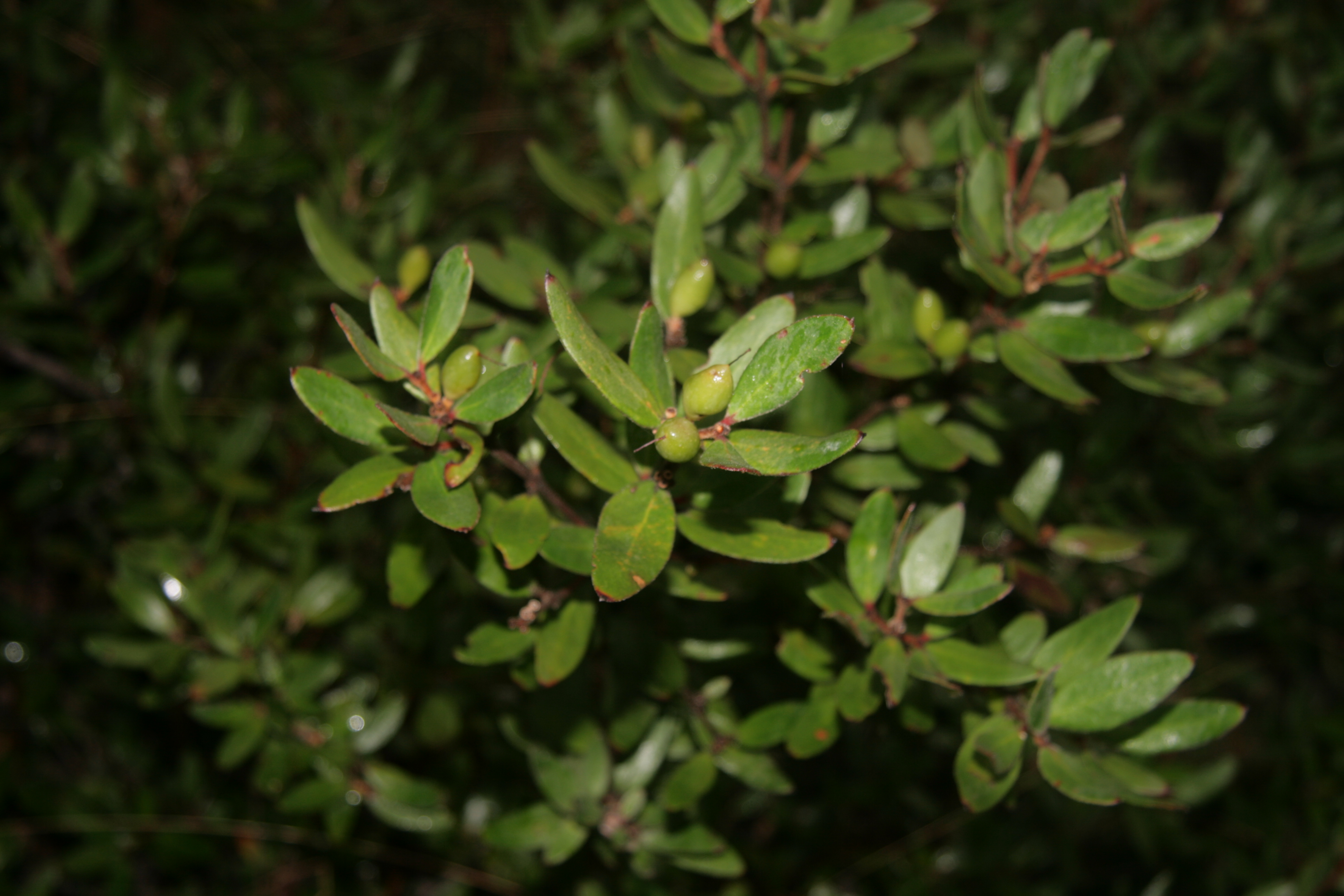
Subspecies leiogyna with fruit, near Kowmung River

Persoonia laurina grows as a shrub with an upright or sprawling habit reaching anywhere from 0.2 to 2 metres (7 3/4 in to 6 ft 6 3/4 in) tall. New growth is covered with dense grey to rusty-brown hairs. Flowering takes place over November to January. Seedlings have only two cotyledon leaves, unlike many members of the genus, which have more.

== Ecology ==
All three subspecies resprout after bushfire from a woody lignotuber. Subspecies laurina is estimated to have a lifespan of 50 to 100 years.

== Uses and cultivation ==
The bark was traditionally used by Aboriginal people to soak fishing lines and toughen them. Drupes were eaten by indigenous people on the Beecroft Peninsula, though were not as highly regarded as those of P. lanceolata.

P. laurina is an attractive plant with horticultural potential. Cultivating it would most likely require good water drainage, a position in sun or dappled shade and acidic soil. It is hardy to frosts. However, it appears to be short-lived in cultivation, with plants at the Mount Annan Botanic Gardens surviving for a maximum of six years after planting out. While difficult to propagate by seed, it has been easier to propagate by cuttings of new growth.
