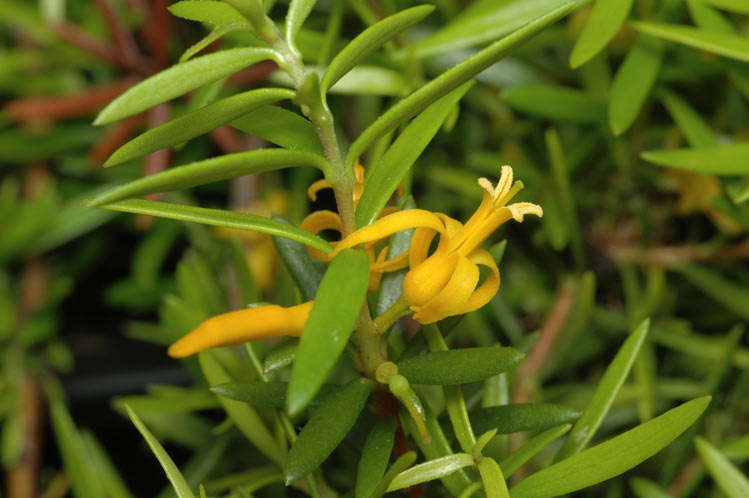

Scientific classification
- Kingdom: Plantae
- Clade: Tracheophytes
- Clade: Angiosperms
- Clade: Eudicots
- Order: Proteales
- Family: Proteaceae
- Genus: Persoonia
- Species: P. recedens

Binomial name
- Persoonia recedens Gand.

= Persoonia recedens =

Species of flowering plant

Persoonia recedens is a species of flowering plant in the family Proteaceae and is endemic to a restricted area of New South Wales, Australia. It is a spreading to low-lying shrub with hairy young branchlets, narrow oblong to narrow elliptic leaves, and yellow flowers borne in groups of up to twelve on a rachis up to 75 mm (3.0 in) that continues to grow after flowering.

== Description ==
Persoonia recedens is a spreading to low-lying shrub that typically grows to a height of 0.3–1.5 m (1 ft 0 in – 4 ft 11 in) with smooth bark and sparsely to moderately hairy young branchlets. The leaves are narrow oblong to narrow elliptic, 10–20 mm (0.39–0.79 in) long and 1.2–3.5 mm (0.047–0.138 in) wide. The flowers are arranged in groups of up to twelve on a rachis up to 70 mm (2.8 in) long that continues to grow after flowering, each flower on a pedicel 2–3.5 mm (0.079–0.138 in) long with a leaf at its base. The tepals are yellow, 9–10 mm (0.35–0.39 in) long and glabrous. Flowering occurs from December to January.

== Taxonomy ==
Persoonia recedens was first formally described in 1919 by Michel Gandoger in the Bulletin de la Société Botanique de France from specimens collected by Carl Walter near Blackheath in 1882.

== Distribution and habitat ==
This geebung grows in forest on sandstone between the Newnes Plateau and Blackheath in New South Wales.
