= Leioproctus perpolitus =

Scientific classification
- Kingdom: Animalia
- Phylum: Arthropoda
- Clade: Pancrustacea
- Class: Insecta
- Order: Hymenoptera
- Family: Colletidae
- Genus: Leioproctus
- Species: L. perpolitus

Binomial name
- Leioproctus perpolitus (Cockerell, 1916)

Synonyms
- Paracolletes perpolitus Cockerell, 1916

Species of bee

Leioproctus perpolitus, or Leioproctus (Cladocerapis) perpolitus, is a species of bee in the family Colletidae and subfamily Colletinae. It is endemic to Australia. It was described by British-American entomologist Theodore Dru Alison Cockerell in 1916.

== Description ==
Male body length is 9.5 mm. Colouration is mainly black with red markings, with white to greyish-brown hair.

== Distribution and habitat ==
The species occurs in south-west Western Australia. The type locality is Yallingup.

== Behaviour ==
The adults are flying mellivores.
