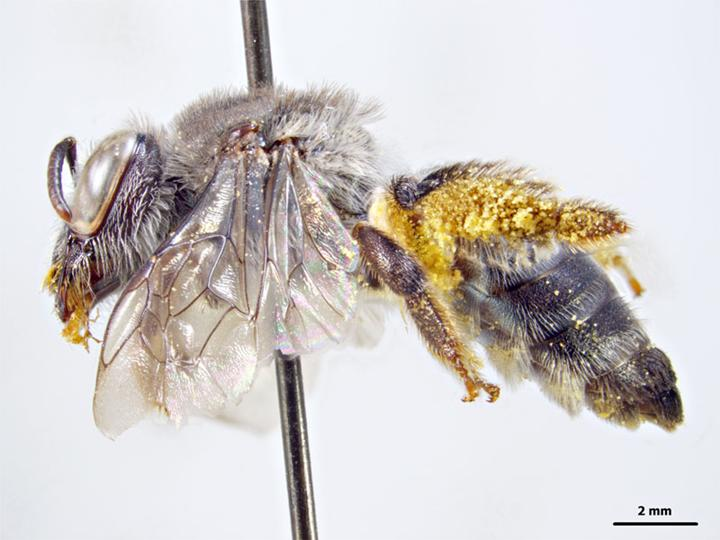
- Female

Scientific classification
- Kingdom: Animalia
- Phylum: Arthropoda
- Clade: Pancrustacea
- Class: Insecta
- Order: Hymenoptera
- Family: Colletidae
- Genus: Leioproctus
- Species: L. incanescens

Binomial name
- Leioproctus incanescens (Cockerell, 1913)

Synonyms
- Paracolletes incanescens Cockerell, 1913; Paracolletes punctiventris Cockerell, 1929; Cladocerapis persooniae Rayment, 1950

= Leioproctus incanescens =

Species of bee

Leioproctus incanescens, or Leioproctus (Cladocerapis) incanescens, is a species of bee in the family Colletidae and subfamily Colletinae. It is endemic to Australia. It was described by British-American entomologist Theodore Dru Alison Cockerell in 1913.

== Description ==
Female body length is about 11 mm, male about 9 mm. Colouration is mainly glossy black with white hair.

== Distribution and habitat ==
The species occurs in coastal eastern Australia. Type localities include Stradbroke Island in Queensland, as well as Sydney and Jamberoo in New South Wales.

== Behaviour ==
The adults are solitary flying mellivores that have sedentary larvae and nest gregariously in the ground. Flowering plants visited by the bees include Claoxylon, Leptospermum, Lomatia and Persoonia species.

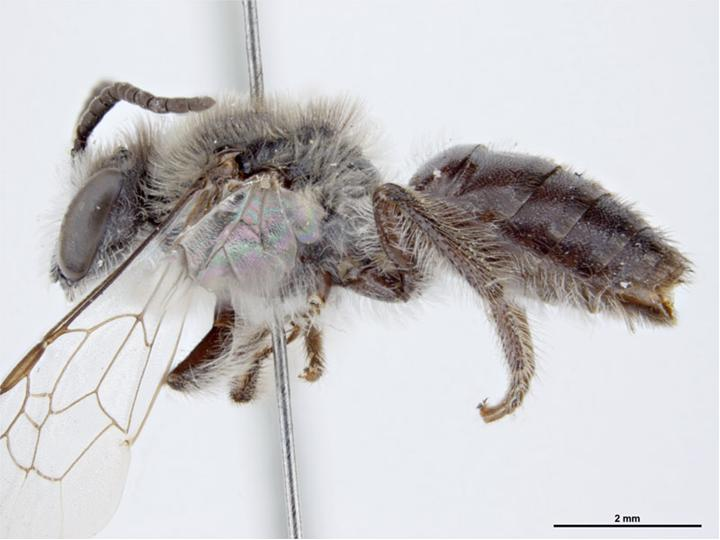
Male
