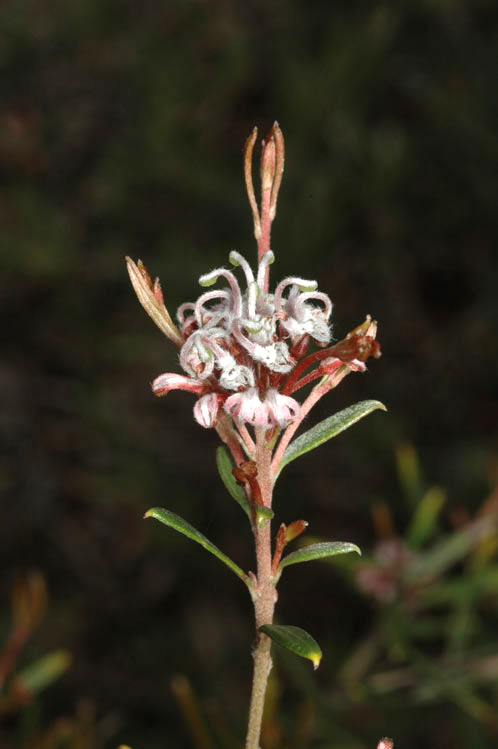
- In the Australian National Botanic Gardens

Conservation status
- Least Concern (IUCN 3.1)

Scientific classification
- Kingdom: Plantae
- Clade: Tracheophytes
- Clade: Angiosperms
- Clade: Eudicots
- Order: Proteales
- Family: Proteaceae
- Genus: Grevillea
- Species: G. sphacelata

Binomial name
- Grevillea sphacelata R.Br.

Synonyms
- Grevillea buxifolia subsp. sphacelata (R.Br.) McGill.; Grevillea phylicoides Meisn. nom. inval., pro syn.; Grevillea walteri Gand.

= Grevillea sphacelata =

Species of plant endemic to Australia

Grevillea sphacelata, also known as the grey spider flower, is a species of flowering plant in the family Proteaceae and is endemic to the eastern New South Wales. It is a spreading or erect shrub with narrowly linear to oblong leaves and clusters of hairy, pale brown and pink flowers.

== Description ==
Grevillea sphacelata is a spreading to erect shrub that typically grows to a height of 0.4–2.5 m (1 ft 4 in – 8 ft 2 in) and has silky-hairy branchlets. The leaves are narrowly linear to oblong, 7–35 mm (0.28–1.38 in) long and 2–4 mm (0.079–0.157 in) wide with the edges turned down or rolled under. The upper surface of the leaves is glabrous and the lower surface is silky-hairy. The flowers are arranged in umbel-like clusters, the flowers at the ends of the clusters flowering first. The flowers are pale brown and pink, covered with greyish hairs, the pistil 9–12 mm (0.35–0.47 in) long, the style pinkish-grey. Flowering mainly occurs from July to January and the fruit is an oval follicle 18–20 mm (0.71–0.79 in) long.

It can be distinguished from its close relative Grevillea phylicoides by its lack of spreading hairs on the branchlets and leaves, as well as the lack of the prominent appendage ar the end of the style.

== Taxonomy ==
Grevillea sphacelata was first formally described in 1810 by Robert in Transactions of the Linnean Society of London. The specific epithet (sphacelata) derives from Greek sphacelos meaning "having brown or blackish speckles".

== Distribution and habitat ==
Grevillea sphacelata grows in woodland and heath, mainly on the Woronora Plateau but generally in the Sydney Basin and south to Dapto, west to Mittagong, with a disjunct population between Nowra, Huskisson and Wandandian on the south coast of New South Wales.

== Use in horticulture ==
This species is rarely found in cultivation as an ornamental plant, however it is being cultivated by a few members of the Australian Plants Society Grevillea study group.

It is a hardy plant which can grow in a variety of soils, but does best in well-drained sandy, acidic soil in a full-sun or part-shade position. It is tolerant of extended dry periods, but not drought, and can tolerate frosts of -4°C (24.8 °F).

== See also ==
- List of Grevillea species
