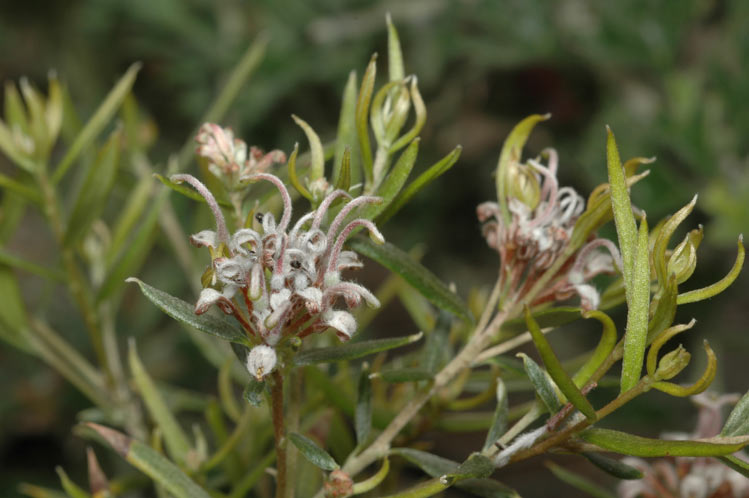
- In the Australian National Botanic Gardens

Scientific classification
- Kingdom: Plantae
- Clade: Tracheophytes
- Clade: Angiosperms
- Clade: Eudicots
- Order: Proteales
- Family: Proteaceae
- Genus: Grevillea
- Species: G. phylicoides

Binomial name
- Grevillea phylicoides R.Br.

Synonyms
- Grevillea buxifolia subsp. phylicoides (R.Br.) McGill.; Grevillea buxifolia subsp. phylicoides 'Blue Mountains form'; Grevillea buxifolia subsp. phylicoides 'Typical form'; Grevillea buxifolia subsp. phylicoides 'race d'

= Grevillea phylicoides =

Species of shrub endemic to Western Australia

Grevillea phylicoides, commonly known as grey spider flower is a species of flowering plant in the family Proteaceae and is endemic to eastern New South Wales. It is a shrub with more or less elliptic to oblong or lance-shaped leaves and woolly-hairy grey flowers.

== Description ==
Grevillea phylicoides is a shrub that typically grows to a height of 1–2 m (3 ft 3 in – 6 ft 7 in) and has woolly- to shaggy-hairy branchlets. Its leaves are more or less elliptic to oblong or lance-shaped with the narrower end towards the base, mostly 10–25 mm (0.39–0.98 in) long and 1.5–4 mm (0.059–0.157 in) wide with the edges turned down, the lower surface with shaggy hairs. The flowers are arranged in umbel-like groups and are covered with white to grey, woolly to shaggy hairs, the pistil 10–13 mm (0.39–0.51 in) long. Flowering occurs from July to March and the fruit is an oval follicle about 15 mm (0.59 in) long.

Grey spider flower is similar to G. buxifolia but has narrower leaves and smaller groups of flowers.

== Taxonomy ==
Grevillea phylicoides was first formally described in 1810 by Robert Brown in Transactions of the Linnean Society of London. The specific epithet (phylicoides) means "Phylica-like".

== Distribution and habitat ==
Grey spider flower grows in woodland and heath between Wisemans Ferry, the Colo Wilderness, the Burragorang Valley and Wentworth Falls in eastern New South Wales.
