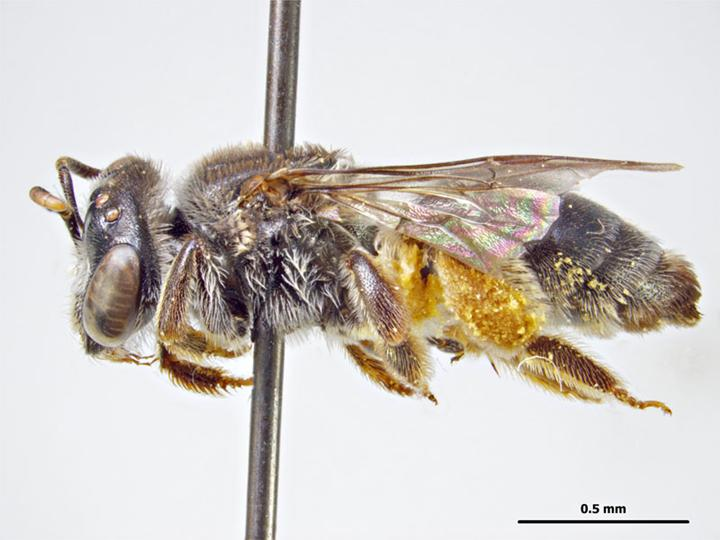
- Female

Scientific classification
- Kingdom: Animalia
- Phylum: Arthropoda
- Clade: Pancrustacea
- Class: Insecta
- Order: Hymenoptera
- Family: Colletidae
- Genus: Leioproctus
- Species: L. speculiferus

Binomial name
- Leioproctus speculiferus (Cockerell, 1921)

Synonyms
- Paracolletes speculiferus Cockerell, 1921; Cladocerapis heronii Rayment, 1935; Cladocerapis woyensis Rayment, 1935; Cladocerapis hackeri Rayment, 1950

= Leioproctus speculiferus =

Species of bee

Leioproctus speculiferus, or Leioproctus (Cladocerapis) speculiferus, is a species of bee in the family Colletidae and subfamily Colletinae. It is endemic to Australia. It was described by British-American entomologist Theodore Dru Alison Cockerell in 1921.

== Description ==
Male body length is 9 mm. Colouration is mainly black, with white to grey hair.

== Distribution and habitat ==
The species occurs in eastern Australia. Type localities include Bribie Island and Lamington National Park in south-east Queensland, as well as Dorrigo and Woy Woy in New South Wales.

== Behaviour ==
The adults are solitary flying mellivores that nest in the ground. Flowering plants visited by the bees include Persoonia species.

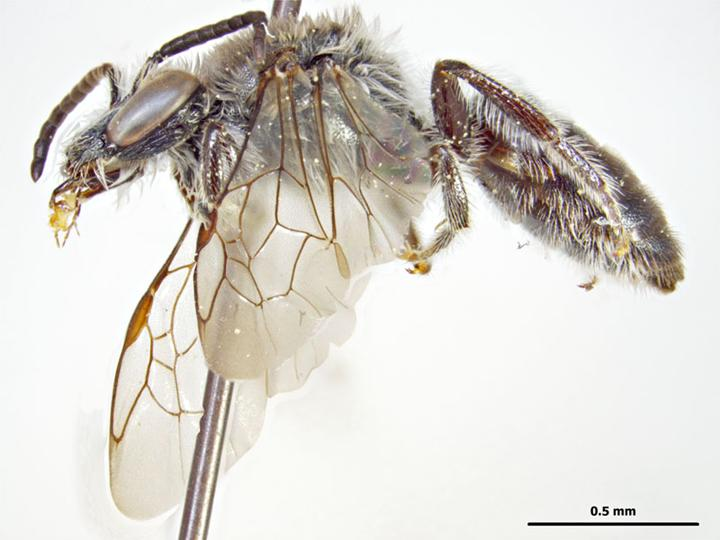
Male
