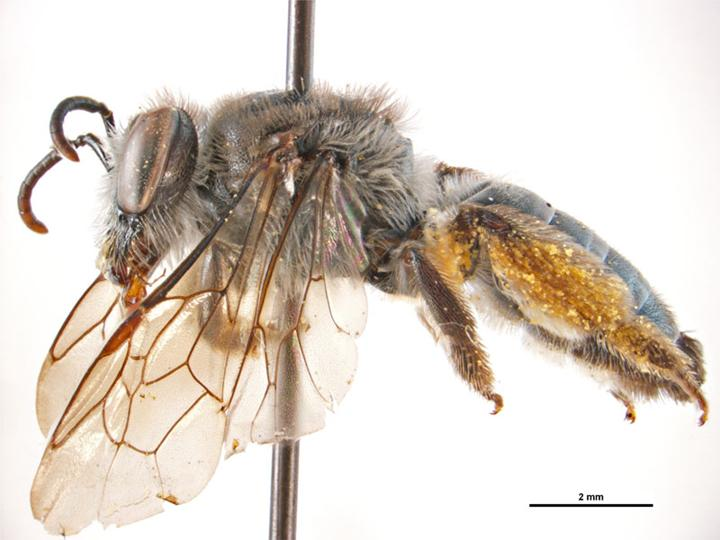
- female

Scientific classification
- Kingdom: Animalia
- Phylum: Arthropoda
- Clade: Pancrustacea
- Class: Insecta
- Order: Hymenoptera
- Family: Colletidae
- Genus: Leioproctus
- Species: L. carinatifrons

Binomial name
- Leioproctus carinatifrons (Cockerell, 1929)

Synonyms
- Paracolletes carinatifrons Cockerell, 1929; Cladocerapis colmani Rayment, 1950; Cladocerapis goraeensis Rayment, 1953; Leioproctus (Cladocerapis) carinatifrons (Cockerell, 1929); Leioproctus (Cladocerapis) colmani (Rayment, 1950); Leioproctus (Cladocerapis) goraeensis (Rayment, 1953)

= Leioproctus carinatifrons =

Species of bee

Leioproctus carinatifrons is a species of bee in the family Colletidae and subfamily Colletinae. It is endemic to Australia. It was first described in 1929 by Theodore Dru Alison Cockerell as Paracolletes carinatifrons. It is closely related to L. perpolitus from Western Australia

== Description ==
Males are around 10 millimetres (0.39 in) long, and females 7 mm (0.28 in).

== Distribution and habitat ==
It is found in coastal regions of New South Wales, Victoria and South Australia, and feeds on the nectar of various species of Persoonia.
