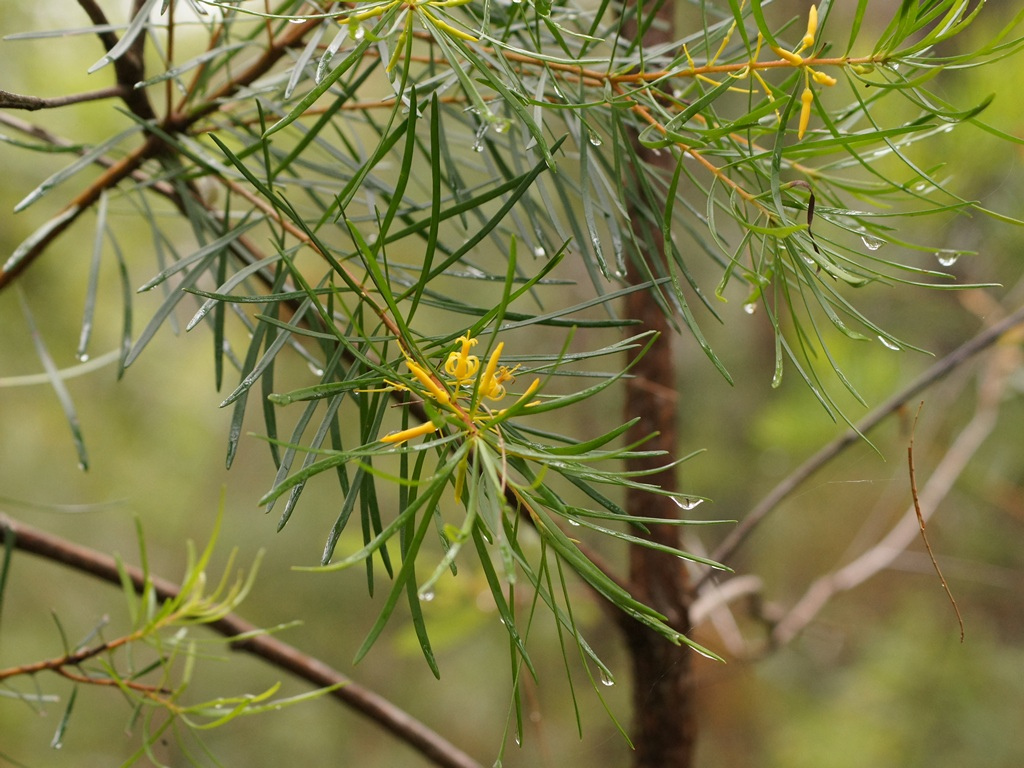

Scientific classification
- Kingdom: Plantae
- Clade: Tracheophytes
- Clade: Angiosperms
- Clade: Eudicots
- Order: Proteales
- Family: Proteaceae
- Genus: Persoonia
- Species: P. virgata

Binomial name
- Persoonia virgata R.Br.

Synonyms
- Linkia virgata (R.Br.) Kuntze; Persoonia linariifolia Benth. nom. inval., pro syn.; Persoonia virgata R.Br. var. virgata

= Persoonia virgata =

Species of flowering plant

Persoonia virgata is a species of flowering plant in the family Proteaceae and is endemic to coastal areas of eastern Australia. It is usually an erect shrub with smooth bark, hairy young branchlets, linear to narrow spatula-shaped leaves, and yellow flowers borne in groups of up to seventy-five on a rachis up to 230 mm (9.1 in) long that continues to grow after flowering.

== Description ==
Persoonia virgata is usually an erect, rarely prostrate shrub that typically grows to a height of 0.5–4 m (1 ft 8 in – 13 ft 1 in) with smooth bark and branches covered with whitish or greyish hairs when young. The leaves are linear to narrow spatula-shaped, 20–50 mm (0.79–1.97 in) long and 1–2 mm (0.039–0.079 in) wide. The flowers are arranged in groups of up to seventy-five on a rachis up to 230 mm (9.1 in) long that continues to grow after flowering, each flower on a pedicel 4–9 mm (0.16–0.35 in) long with a leaf at its base. The tepals are yellow, 4–9 mm (0.16–0.35 in) long and glabrous. Flowering mostly occurs from December to March.

== Taxonomy ==
Persoonia virgata was first formally described in 1810 by Robert Brown in the Transactions of the Linnean Society of London from specimens collected near Sandy Cape.

== Distribution and habitat ==
This geebung grows in heath to forest mostly on old sand dunes in near-coastal areas between Shoalwater Bay in Queensland and Forster in New South Wales.
