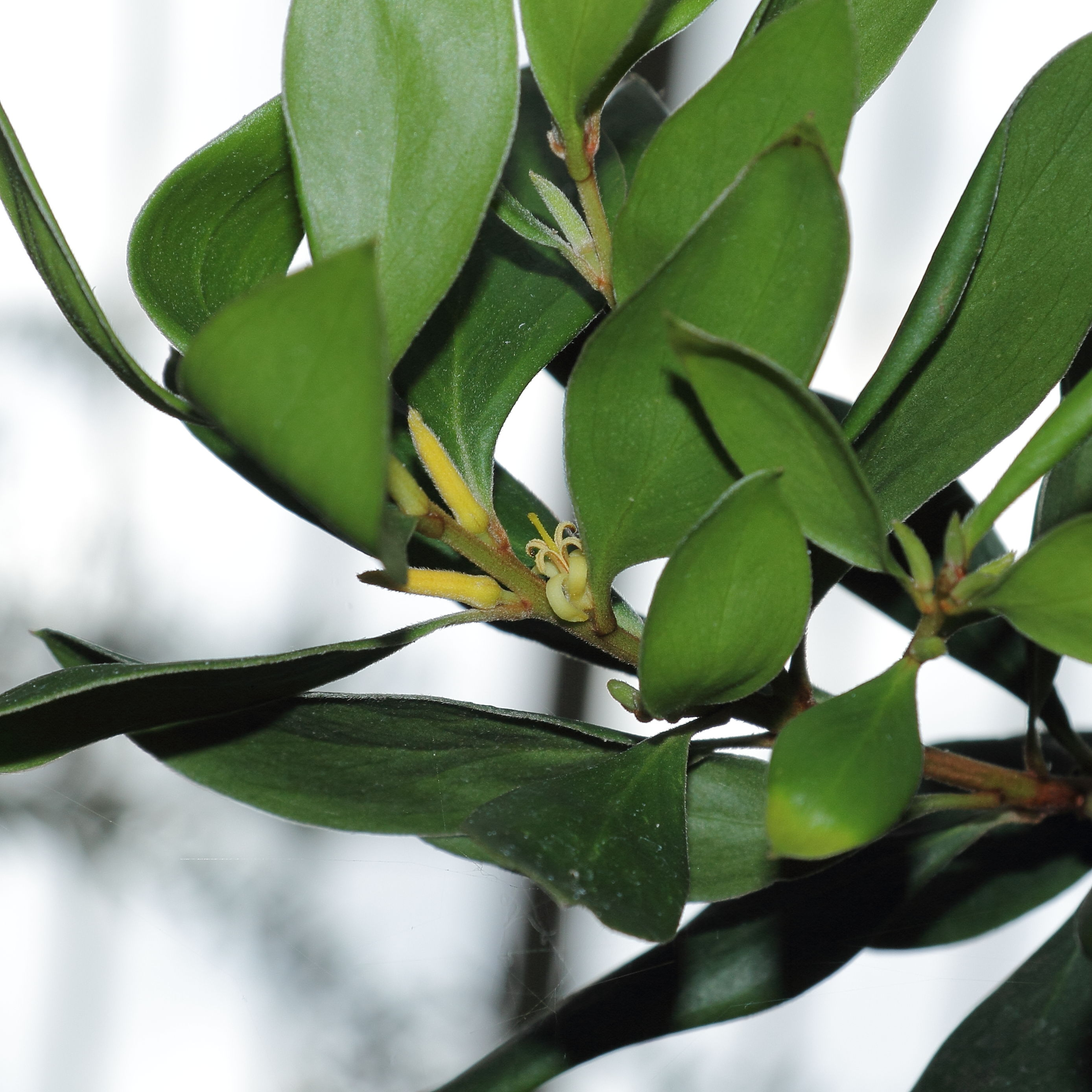
- In Kew Gardens

Scientific classification
- Kingdom: Plantae
- Clade: Tracheophytes
- Clade: Angiosperms
- Clade: Eudicots
- Order: Proteales
- Family: Proteaceae
- Genus: Persoonia
- Species: P. stradbrokensis

Binomial name
- Persoonia stradbrokensis Domin

= Persoonia stradbrokensis =

Species of flowering plant

Persoonia stradbrokensis is a species of flowering plant in the family Proteaceae and is endemic to eastern Australia. It is an erect shrub or tree with hairy young branchlets, elliptic to egg-shaped leaves, and yellow flowers borne in groups of up to twenty on a rachis up to 100 mm (3.9 in), each flower with a leaf or scale leaf at its base.

== Description ==
Persoonia stradbrokensis is an erect shrub or tree that typically grows to a height of 1–6 m (3 ft 3 in – 19 ft 8 in) with smooth bark above, rough bark on the lower trunk, and branchlets that are covered with greyish to light brown hairs when young. The leaves are broadly elliptical to egg-shaped, 30–110 mm (1.2–4.3 in) long, 10–40 mm (0.39–1.57 in) wide and hairy when young. The flowers are arranged in groups of up to twenty along a rachis up to 100 mm (3.9 in) long that continues to grow after flowering, each flower on a pedicel 1–4 mm (0.039–0.157 in) long with a leaf or scale leaf at its base. The tepals are yellow and 10–13 mm (0.39–0.51 in) long. Flowering mainly occurs from December to May and the fruit is a drupe.

== Taxonomy ==
Persoonia stradbrokensis was first formally described in 1921 by Karel Domin in Bibliotheca Botanica from specimens he collected on Stradbroke Island in 1910.

== Distribution and habitat ==
This geebung grows from coastal heath to forest in near-coastal areas of Australia between Tin Can Bay in south-eastern Queensland and the Hastings River in north-eastern New South Wales.
