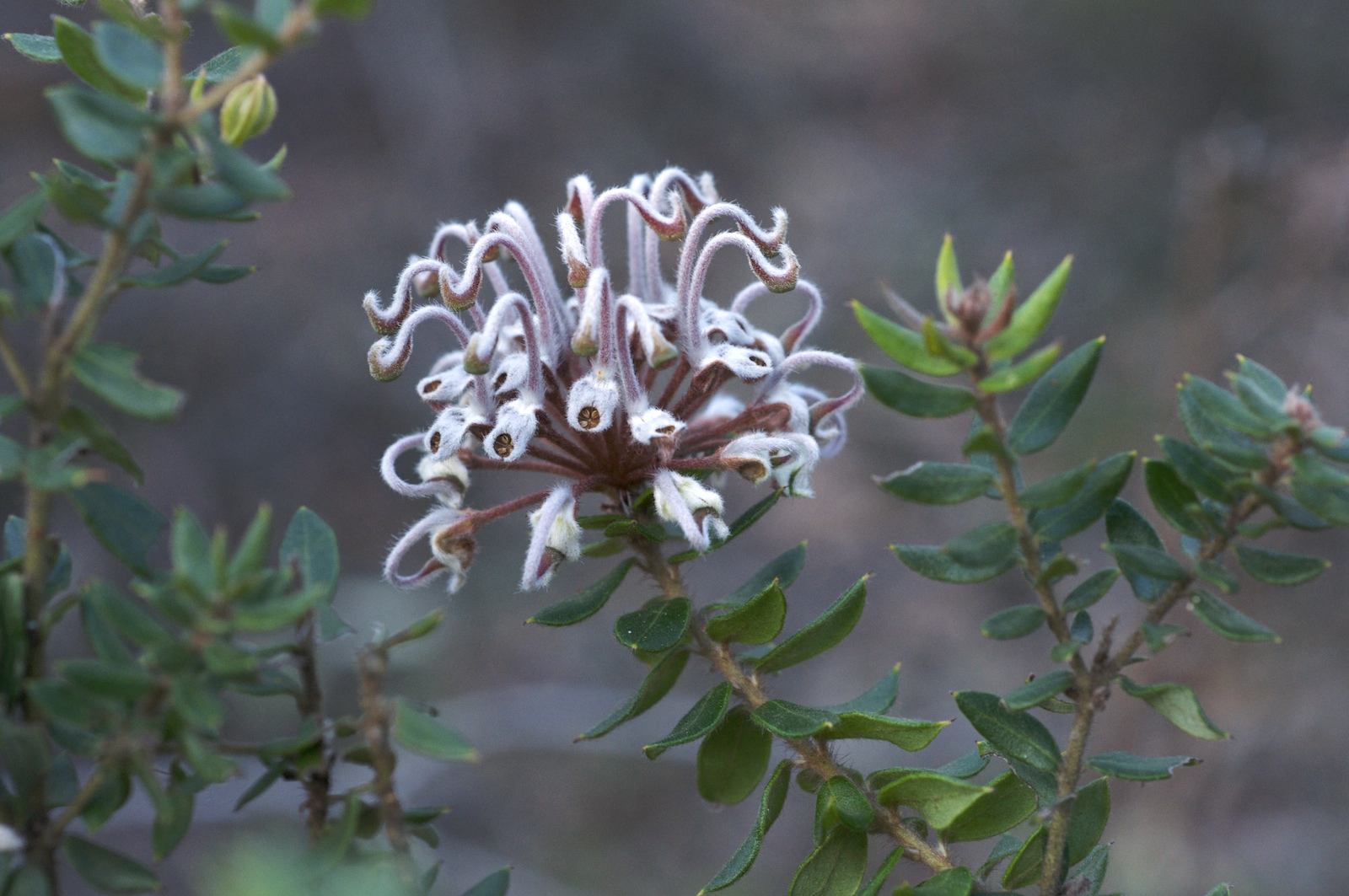
- Grevillea buxifolia in Ku-ring-gai Chase National Park

Conservation status
- Least Concern (IUCN 3.1)

Scientific classification
- Kingdom: Plantae
- Clade: Embryophytes
- Clade: Tracheophytes
- Clade: Spermatophytes
- Clade: Angiosperms
- Clade: Eudicots
- Order: Proteales
- Family: Proteaceae
- Genus: Grevillea
- Species: G. buxifolia

Binomial name
- Grevillea buxifolia (Sm.) R.Br.

Subspecies
- Grevillea buxifolia (Sm.) R.Br. subsp. buxifolia; Grevillea buxifolia subsp. ecorniculata Olde & Marriott

= Grevillea buxifolia =

Grey spider flower

Species of plant endemic to New South Wales, Australia

Grevillea buxifolia, commonly known as grey spider flower, is a species of flowering plant in the family Proteaceae, and is endemic to New South Wales, Australia. It is an erect to spreading shrub with elliptic to egg-shaped leaves, and woolly-hairy clusters of rust-coloured to fawn flowers.

== Description ==
Grevillea buxifolia is an erect to spreading shrub that typically grows to a height of 0.5–2 m (1 ft 8 in – 6 ft 7 in). The leaves are egg-shaped, narrowly oblong to elliptic, 7–35 mm (0.28–1.38 in) long and 2.0–8.5 mm (0.079–0.335 in) wide with the edges turned down or rolled under. The flowers are arranged in clusters on the ends of branchlets and are covered with woolly, rust-coloured to fawn and whitish hairs, the pistil 11–21 mm (0.43–0.83 in) long. Flowering mainly occurs from spring to autumn and the fruit is a usually hairy, oval follicle 18–22 mm (0.71–0.87 in) long.

== Taxonomy ==
This species was first formally described in 1794 by James Edward Smith who gave it the name Embothrium boxifolium in his A Specimen of the Botany of New Holland. In 1810, Robert Brown changed the name to Grevillea buxifolia in Transactions of the Linnean Society of London. The specific epithet (buxifolia) means "box-tree-leaved".

The names of two subspecies of G. buxifolia are accepted by the Australian Plant Census:

- Grevillea buxifolia (Sm.) R.Br. subsp. buxifolia has a conspicuous appendage usually 2–4 mm (0.079–0.157 in) long on the style;
- Grevillea buxifolia subsp. ecorniculata Olde & Marriott usually lacks a style appendage, but if present, it is less than 1.3 mm (0.051 in) long.

== Distribution and habitat ==
Grey spider flower grows in woodland or heath in New South Wales, on the South Coast, Central Coast and inland to near Pigeon House Mountain west of Ulladulla. Subspecies ecorniculata is restricted to the area between Putty, Gospers Mountain and Wollombi north-west of Sydney.

== Conservation status ==
Despite its relatively limited distribution, Grevillea buxifolia is listed as least concern on the IUCN Red List of Threatened Species, as it is locally common, its population is presumed to be stable, it occurs within protected areas and there are no major threats currently affecting it. The main threat to this species is inappropriate fire regimes, meaning an increased frequency in bushfires.
