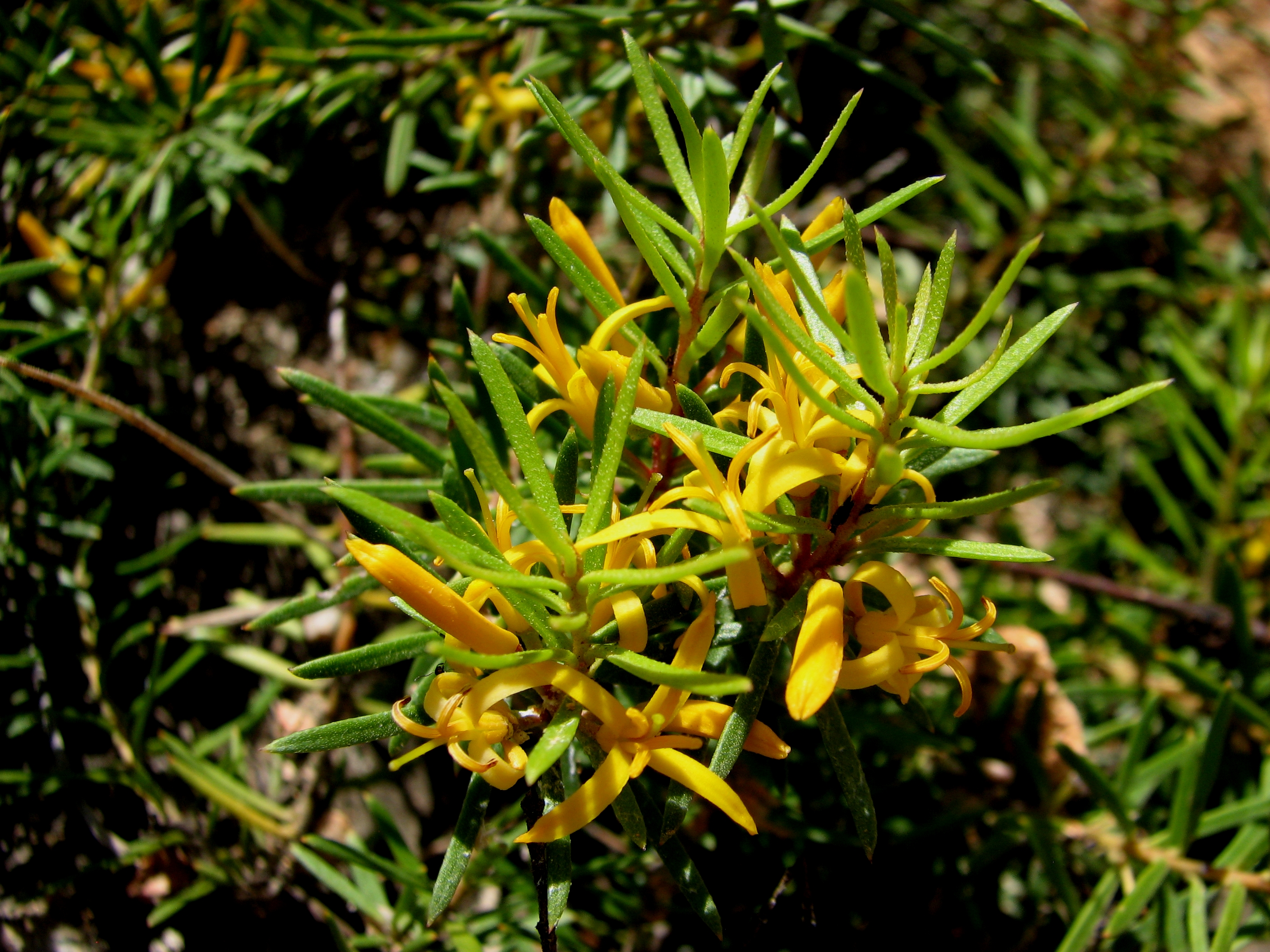
- Persoonia chamaepeuce in the Alpine National Park

Scientific classification
- Kingdom: Plantae
- Clade: Tracheophytes
- Clade: Angiosperms
- Clade: Eudicots
- Order: Proteales
- Family: Proteaceae
- Genus: Persoonia
- Species: P. chamaepeuce

Binomial name
- Persoonia chamaepeuce Lhotsky ex Meisn.
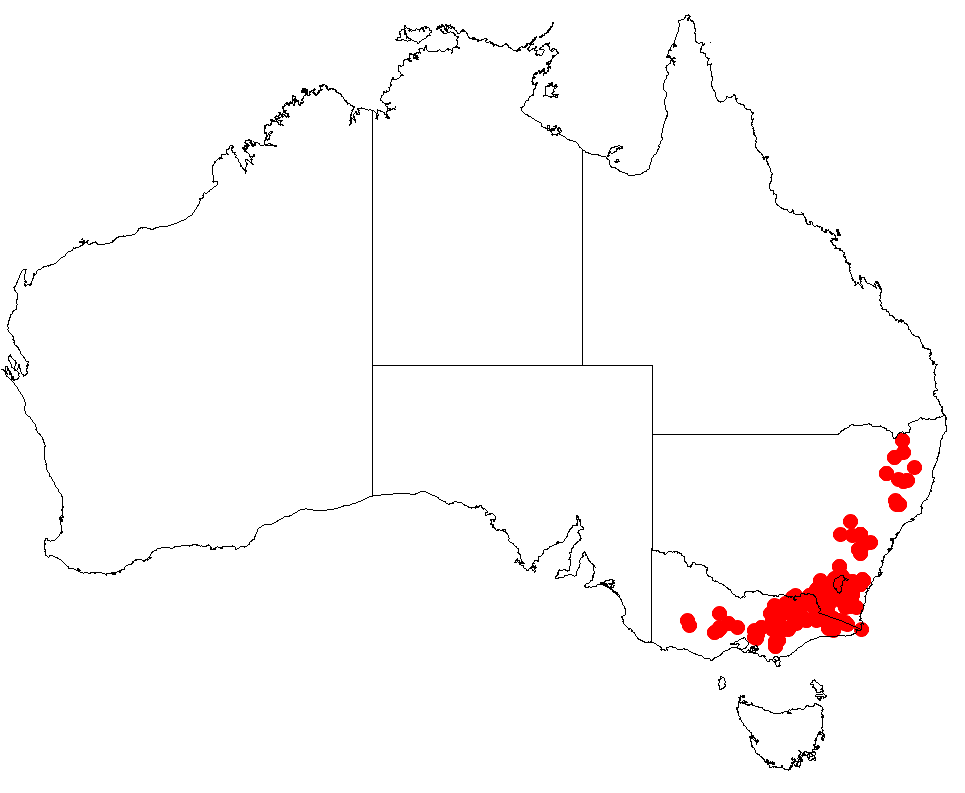
- Occurrence data downloaded from AVH

Synonyms
- Linkia chamaepeuce (Lhotsky ex Meisn.) Kuntze; Persoonia effusa Gand; Persoonia myrioclada Gand; Persoonia viridula Gand

= Persoonia chamaepeuce =

Dwarf geebung

Species of flowering plant

Persoonia chamaepeuce, commonly known as the dwarf geebung or heathy geebung, is a species of flowering plant in the family Proteaceae and is endemic to south-eastern continental Australia. It is a prostrate shrub with crowded, linear leaves and yellow flowers in the leaf axils.

== Description ==
Persoonia chamaepeuce is a prostrate shrub, sometimes with the ends of the branches raised to a height of 30 cm (12 in). The young branches are more or less glabrous. It has smooth, glabrous, linear leaves which are 8–25 mm (0.3–1 in) long, 1–2 mm (0.04–0.08 in) wide, straight or curved with the upper surface slightly dished. The flowers are arranged singly in leaf axils on a glabrous pedicel 3–6 mm (0.1–0.2 in) long. The flower is composed of four hairy tepals 9–13 mm (0.4–0.5 in) long, which are fused at the base but with the tips rolled back. The central style is surrounded by four yellow anthers which are also joined at the base with the tips rolled back, so that it resembles a cross when viewed end-on. The anthers have a spine about 1 mm (0.04 in) long on the end. The ovary is glabrous. Flowering occurs from December to March and is followed by fruit which are yellowish-green, oval-shaped drupes about 10 mm (0.4 in) long and 6 mm (0.2 in) wide.

It is sometimes confused with the similar Persoonia chamaepitys, but this latter species has more crowded terete leaves.

== Taxonomy and naming ==
Persoonia chamaepeuce was first formally described in 1856 by Carl Meissner from an unpublished manuscript by Polish botanist John Lhotsky in Prodromus Systematis Naturalis Regni Vegetabilis. The specific epithet (chamaepeuce) is derived from the Ancient Greek words chamai meaning "on the ground" or "dwarf" and peuke meaning "pine". German botanist Otto Kuntze proposed the binomial name Linkia chamaepeuce in 1891, from Cavanilles' original description of the genus Linkia but the name was eventually rejected in favour of Persoonia. In 1919, French botanist Michel Gandoger described three species all since reallocated to P. chamaepeuce; P. effusa , P. myrioclada and P. viridula. Gandoger described 212 taxa of Australian plants, almost all of which turned out to be species already described.

The genus was reviewed by Peter Weston for the Flora of Australia treatment in 1995, and P. chamaepeuce was placed in the Lanceolata group, a group of 54 closely related species with similar flowers but very different foliage. These species will often interbreed with each other where two members of the group occur, and hybrids of P. chamaepeuce have been reported with Persoonia asperula, Persoonia confertiflora and Persoonia linearis.

== Distribution and habitat ==
The dwarf geebung grows in woodland and forest along the tablelands south from the New England district in New South Wales to Victoria where it is widely distributed and locally common in montane and subalpine areas.

== Use in horticulture ==
This geebung is suitable as a groundcover and has well-displayed flowers. It can be propagated from seed but requires a sunny position in well-drained soil. Although slow growing, it adapts readily to cultivation in areas of temperate climate.
