= Mountain geebung =

Mountain geebung may refer to several species of flowering plants in the genus Persoonia, occurring in Australia:

- Persoonia asperula, from New South Wales and Victoria
- Persoonia chamaepitys, from New South Wales
- Persoonia gunnii, from Tasmania
