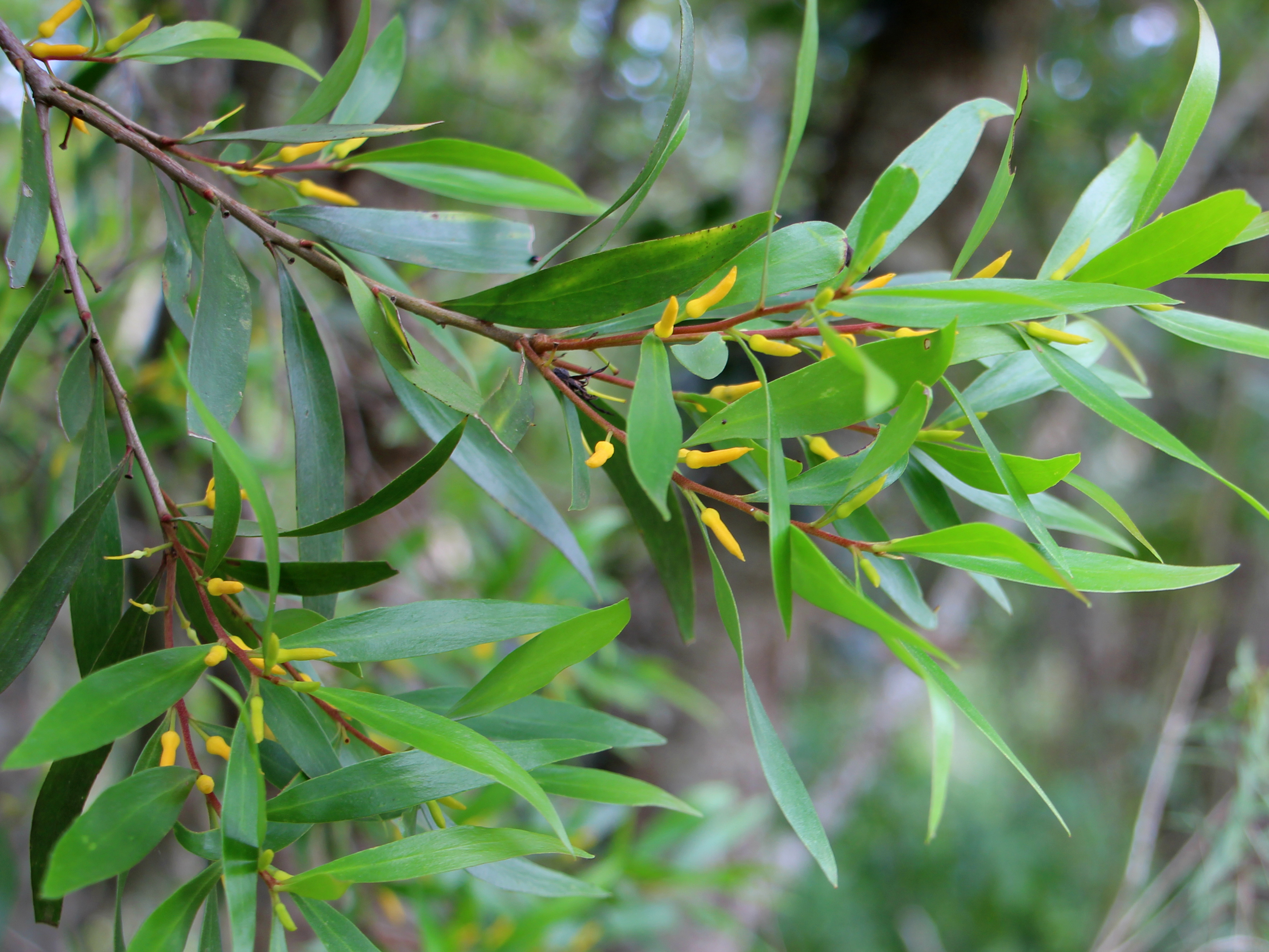
- At Dangar Falls

Scientific classification
- Kingdom: Plantae
- Clade: Tracheophytes
- Clade: Angiosperms
- Clade: Eudicots
- Order: Proteales
- Family: Proteaceae
- Genus: Persoonia
- Species: P. media

Binomial name
- Persoonia media R.Br.

Synonyms
- Linkia media (R.Br.) Kuntze

= Persoonia media =

Species of flowering plant

Persoonia media is a species of flowering plant in the family Proteaceae and is endemic to eastern Australia. It is an erect to spreading shrub or tree with branchlets and leaves that are glabrous or only sparsely hairy, elliptic to egg-shaped and up to sixteen yellow flowers on a rachis up to 150 mm (5.9 in) long.

== Description ==
Persoonia media is a spreading shrub or tree that shows considerable variability, with a maximum height anywhere from 0.3 m (1 ft 0 in) to 25 m (82 ft). Plants in dry sites south of the Macleay River grow from lignotubers and are short and multi-stemmed, while those growing in wetter areas are taller, single-stemmed and tend to have narrower leaves. The bark is smooth but finely fissured at the base of the trunk. Branchlets, leaves and flowers are glabrous or sparsely hairy with light brown to rust-coloured hairs. The leaves are elliptic to egg-shaped, 30–140 mm (1.2–5.5 in) long and 4–35 mm (0.16–1.38 in) wide with the edges rolled under. The flowers are arranged singly or in groups of up to sixteen on a rachis on a rachis up to 150 mm (5.9 in) long, each flower on a pedicel 3–10 mm (0.12–0.39 in) long, the tepals yellow and 10–14 mm (0.39–0.55 in) long. Flowering occurs from December to April.

== Taxonomy ==
Persoonia media was first formally described in 1830 by Robert Brown in the supplement to his Prodromus Florae Novae Hollandiae et Insulae Van Diemen. The genus was reviewed by Peter Weston for the Flora of Australia treatment in 1995, and P. media was placed in the Lanceolata group, a group of 54 closely related species with similar flowers but very different foliage. These species will often interbreed with each other where two members of the group occur. Hybrids with P. oleoides, P. linearis, P. conjuncta and possibly P. adenantha have been recorded.

== Distribution and habitat ==
This geebung is found on the Lamington and Springbrook Plateaus in south-eastern Queensland, and south through the Nightcap National Park, the upper Manning River, the eastern part of the New England Tableland and as far south as Barrington Tops. It grows in forest, including rainforest on soils derived from igneous and metamorphic rocks.

== Ecology ==
Researchers from the University of New England found that P. media is killed by fire and regenerates from seed. It takes around 5 to 6 years to reach maturity from seed, though is generally a short-lived plant with a life span of twenty years or less.
