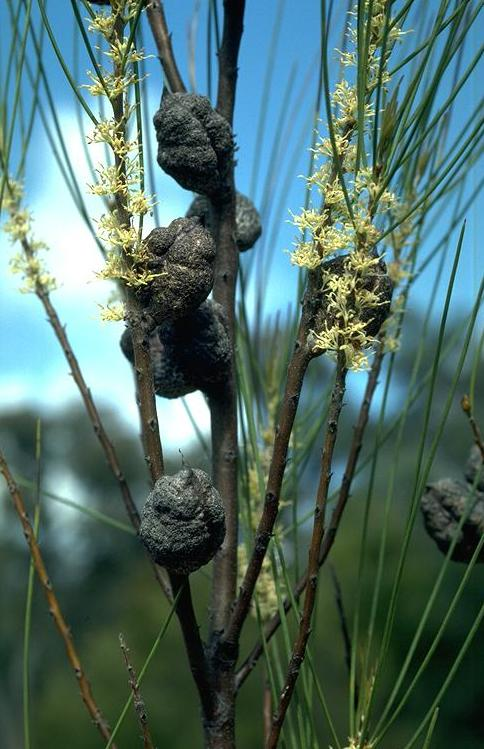
- Hakea dohertyi in the ANBG

Conservation status
- Endangered (EPBC Act)

Scientific classification
- Kingdom: Plantae
- Clade: Tracheophytes
- Clade: Angiosperms
- Clade: Eudicots
- Order: Proteales
- Family: Proteaceae
- Genus: Hakea
- Species: H. dohertyi

Binomial name
- Hakea dohertyi Haegi
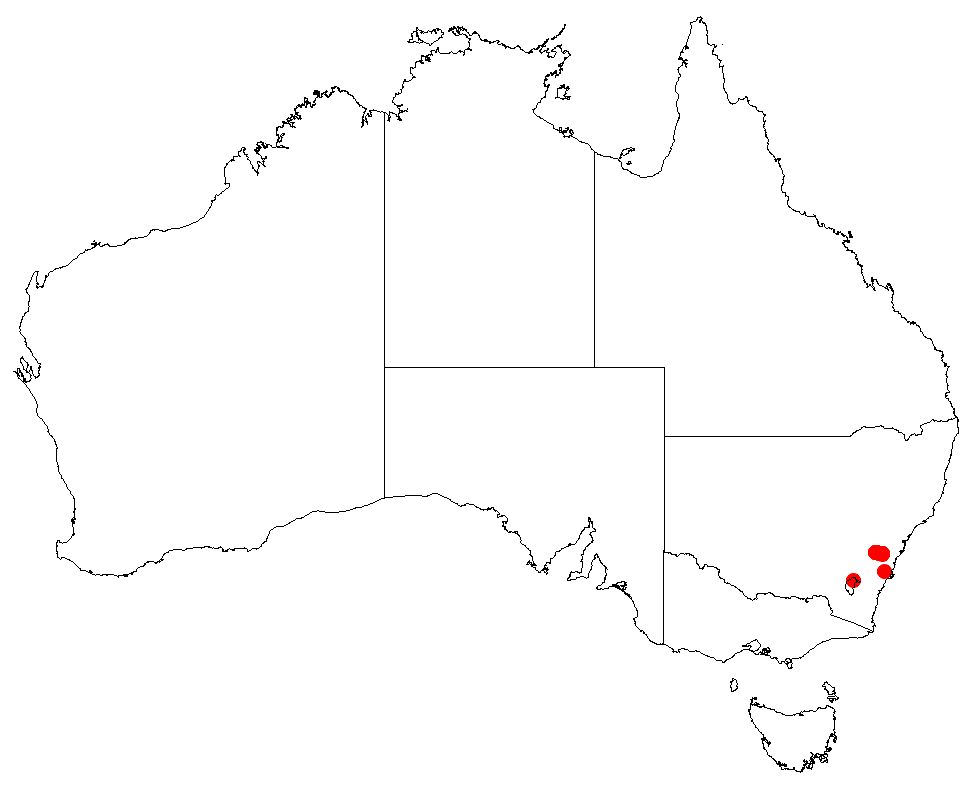
- Occurrence data from AVH

= Hakea dohertyi =

Kowmung hakea

Species of plant endemic to New South Wales, Australia

Hakea dohertyi, commonly known as the Kowmung hakea, is a shrub endemic to a restricted locale in the Great Dividing Range in central New South Wales in Australia.

== Description ==
Hakea dohertyi is an upright, linear shrub growing to 3–6 m (9.8–20 ft) high. The smaller branches are covered with densely matted, silky hairs at flowering time. The leaves are straight, flexible and triangular in cross-section, 20 to 40 cm (7.9 to 15.7 in) long and about 2 mm (0.079 in) wide. The leaves are smooth with three longitudinal veins at an angle to the leaf blade ending in a sharp point. The solitary inflorescence consists of 4–6 cream-white flowers in a raceme in leaf axils. The smooth pedicel is cream-white and the style 3.8–4 mm (0.15–0.16 in) long. The woody oval shaped fruit have a short stalk and grow at an angle to the stem. The fruit are 2.3 to 2.8 cm (0.91 to 1.10 in) long and 1.2 to 2 cm (0.47 to 0.79 in) wide ending with an obscure beak.

== Taxonomy and naming ==
Kowmung hakea was first formally described by Laurence Haegi in 1999 and published in Flora of Australia. Hakea dohertyi is named after ecologist Michael Doherty who discovered the species.

== Distribution and habitat ==
Hakea dohertyi is found in a highly restricted area within Kanangra-Boyd National Park, most plants grow near the Kowmung River. The total area of its range is 18 km^{2} (6.9 sq mi). It grows on sandy or rocky soils over shale or quartzite, and is found on ridges in open sclerophyll forest with grey gum (Eucalyptus punctata, silvertop ash (E. sieberi), Blaxland's stringybark (E. blaxlandii), forest she-oak (Allocasuarina torulosa), and shrubs such as crinkle bush (Lomatia silaifolia), (Stypandra glauca), and narrow-leaved geebung (Persoonia linearis). Hakea dohertyi is killed by bushfire and regenerates from seed stored in a seed bank in its canopy. Most seed is released from the woody follicles after bushfires, but some follicles open and release seed at other times. As the plant requires five years to mature and set seed, bushfires occurring more frequently than this could wipe out the species entirely. The species is currently classified as endangered. It is grazed upon and threatened by wild goats. The rising of the water level of Lake Burragorang could also threaten populations.

== Conservation status ==
Hakea dohertyi is classified as "endangered" by the New South Wales Office of Environment and Heritage.
