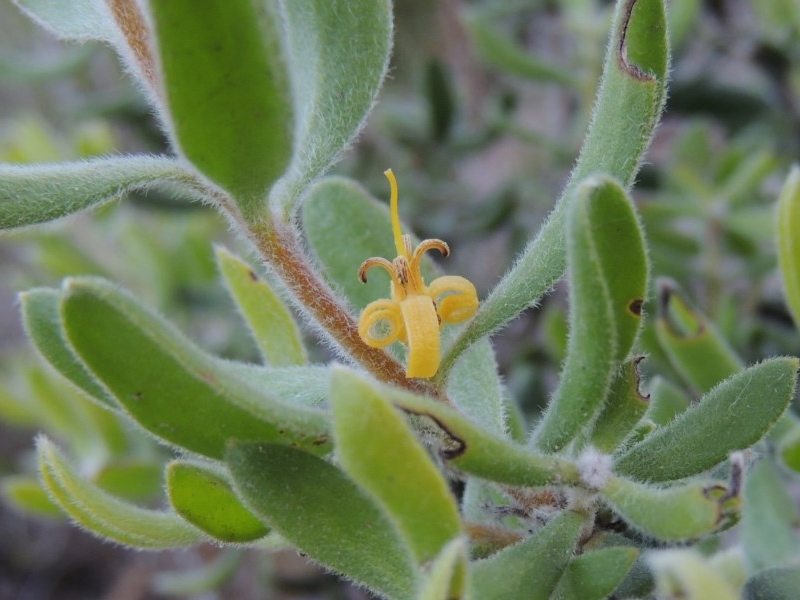
- In the Rob Roy Range Nature Reserve, A.C.T.

Scientific classification
- Kingdom: Plantae
- Clade: Tracheophytes
- Clade: Angiosperms
- Clade: Eudicots
- Order: Proteales
- Family: Proteaceae
- Genus: Persoonia
- Species: P. rigida

Binomial name
- Persoonia rigida R.Br.

Synonyms
- Linkia rigida (R.Br.) Kuntze; Persoonia rigida var. planifolia Meisn.; Persoonia rigida var. revoluta Meisn.; Persoonia rigida R.Br. var. rigida

= Persoonia rigida =

Rigid geebung

Species of flowering plant

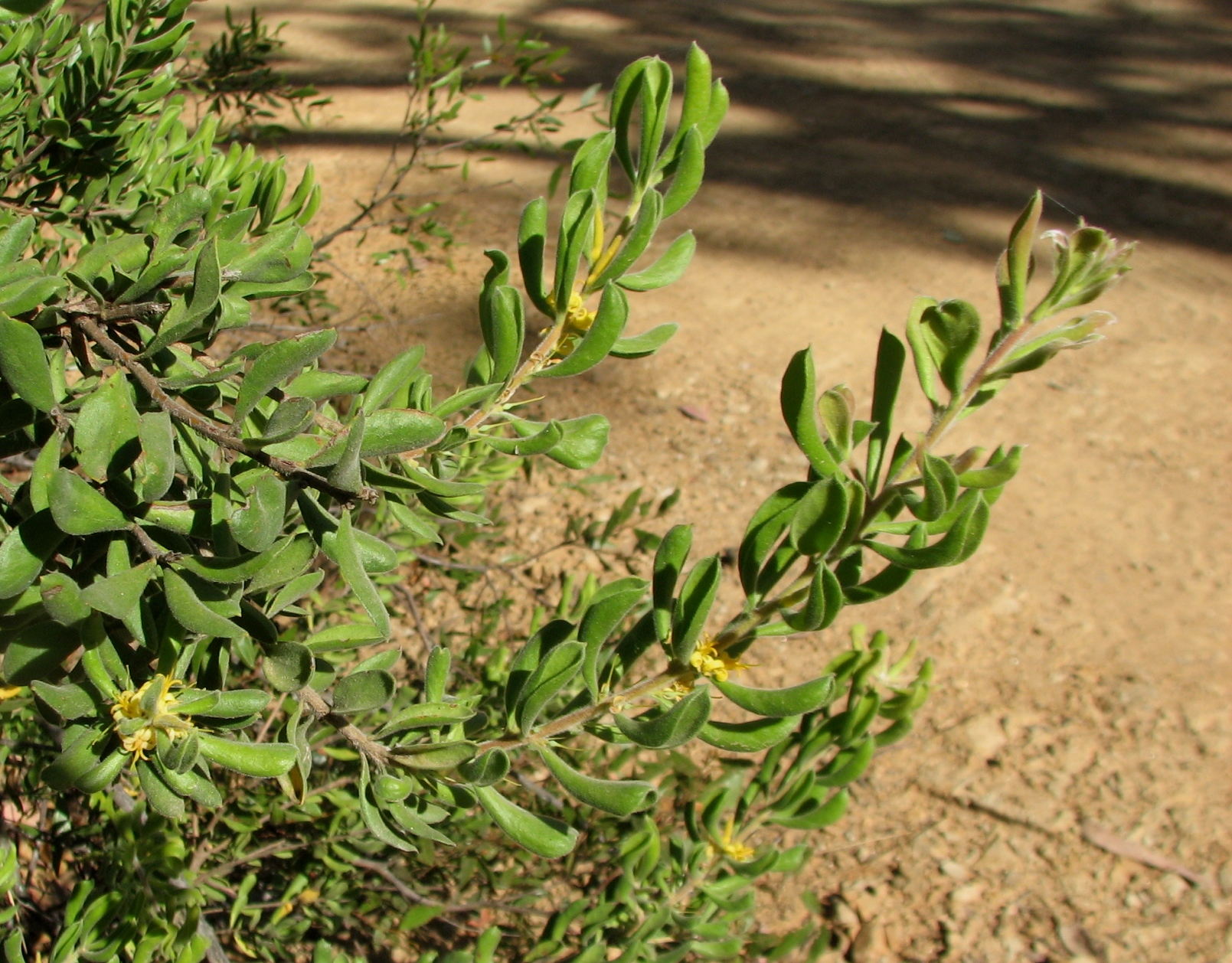
Habit at Mount Mittamatite, Victoria

Persoonia rigida, commonly known as the rigid-, hairy- or stiff geebung, is a species of flowering plant in the family Proteaceae and is endemic to south-eastern Australia. It is an erect to low-lying shrub with hairy young branchlets, lance-shaped to spatula-shaped leaves that are hairy when young, and yellow flowers borne in groups of up to twenty on a rachis up to 90 mm (3.5 in) long that continues to grow after flowering.

== Description ==
Persoonia rigida is an erect to low-lying shrub that typically grows to a height of 0.15–2 m (5.9 in – 6 ft 6.7 in) and has branches and leaves that are hairy when young. The leaves are lance-shaped with the narrower end towards the base, to spatula-shaped, 15–50 mm (0.59–1.97 in) long and 4–19 mm (0.16–0.75 in) wide with the edges curving downwards. The flowers are arranged in groups of up to twenty on a rachis up to 90 mm (3.5 in) long that continues to grow after flowering, each flower on a pedicel 1–3 mm (0.039–0.118 in) long with a leaf at its base. The tepals are yellow, 10–12 mm (0.39–0.47 in) long and hairy on the outside but with a glabrous ovary. Flowering occurs from November to March. The proportion of flowers going on to develop fruit appears to be unusually high in P. rigida compared with other members of the genus.

== Taxonomy ==
Collected by George Caley in 1804, P. rigida was first formally described in 1830 by Scottish botanist Robert Brown in the Supplementum to his Prodromus Florae Novae Hollandiae et Insulae Van Diemen.

Within the genus Persoonia, P. rigida is classified in the lanceolata group, a group of 54 closely related species with similar flowers but very different foliage. These species will often interbreed with each other where two members of the group occur.

== Distribution and habitat ==
Rigid geebung is found from the Liverpool Range in central New South Wales southwards into mid-western Victoria. It occurs on the inland (north and west) side of the Great Dividing Range, but extends eastwards to Springwood in the Lower Blue Mountains at altitudes between 300 and 1,300 m (980 and 4,270 ft). It grows in sandstone-based or rocky soils in dry sclerophyll forest or heathland. It has been known to hybridise with the prickly geebung (P. juniperina) and P. sericea. Associated tree species in Victoria include Eucalyptus macrorhyncha and Eucalyptus polyanthemos.

== Use in horticulture ==
Persoonia rigida was cultivated in England in 1824 but is seldom seen in gardens now, and has little horticultural appeal.
