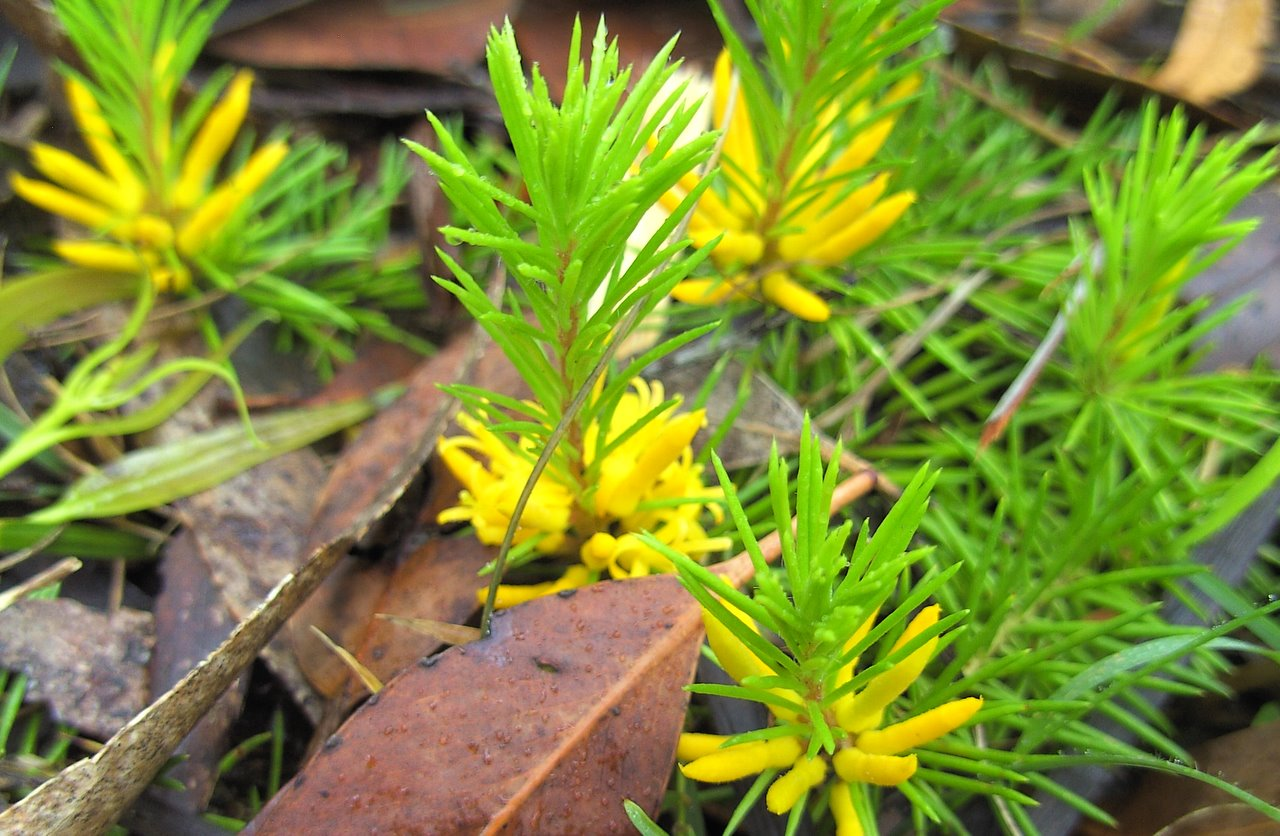

Scientific classification
- Kingdom: Plantae
- Clade: Tracheophytes
- Clade: Angiosperms
- Clade: Eudicots
- Order: Proteales
- Family: Proteaceae
- Genus: Persoonia
- Species: P. chamaepitys

Binomial name
- Persoonia chamaepitys A.Cunn.
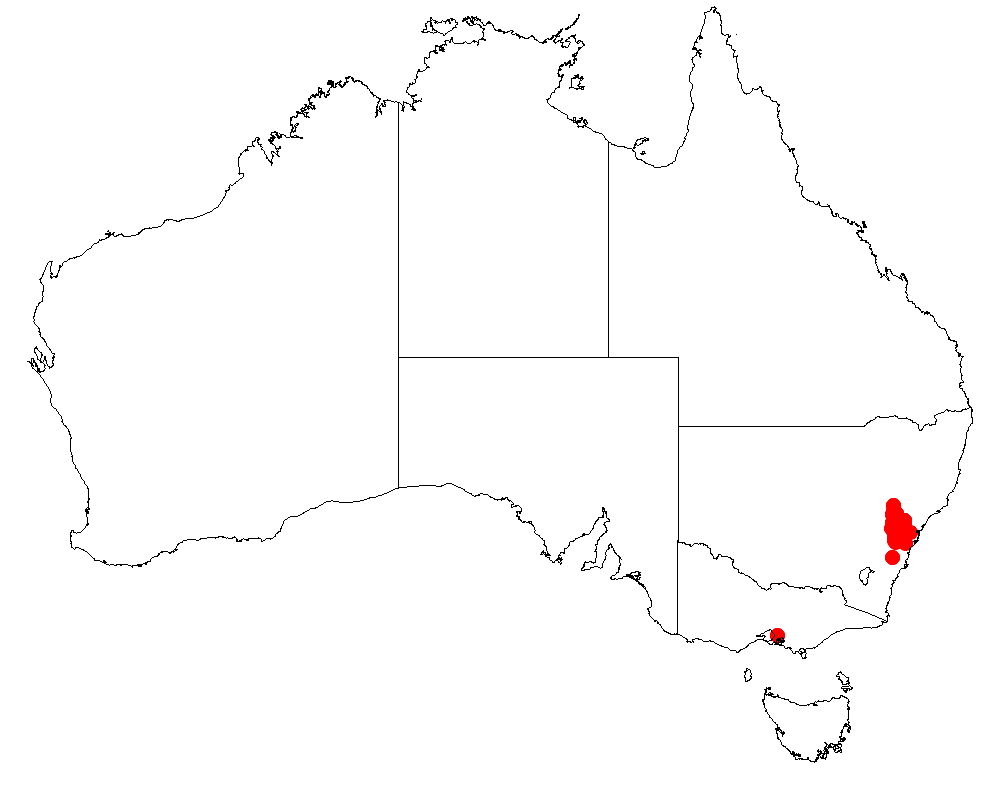
- Occurrence data downloaded from AVH

Synonyms
- Linkia chamaepitys (A.Cunn.) Kuntze; Persoonia gnidioides Sieber ex Schult. [nom. illeg. ]

= Persoonia chamaepitys =

Prostrate geebung

Species of flowering plant

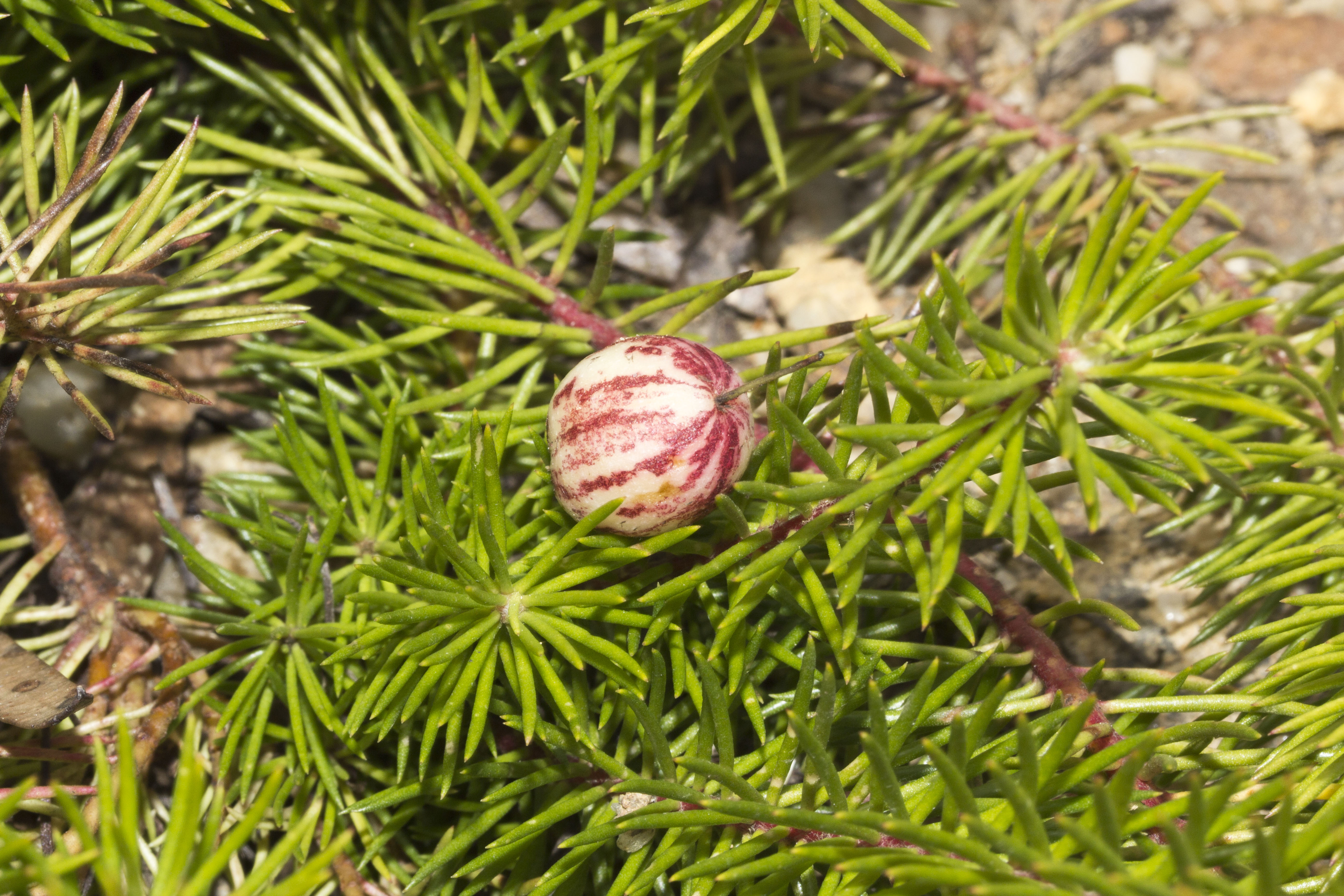
Drupe from Narrow Neck, Blue Mountains

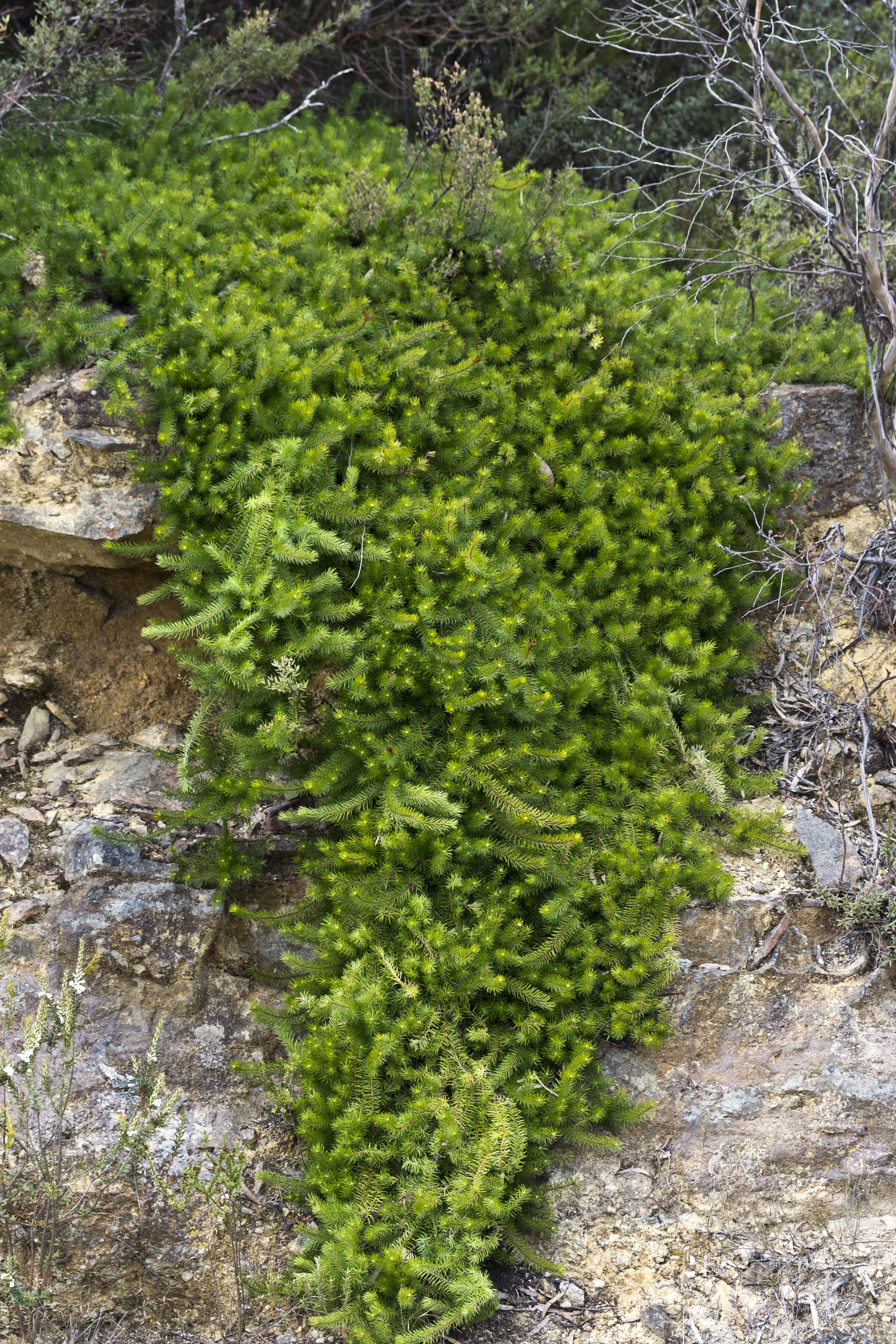
Large plant showing typical habit, Narrow Neck, Blue Mountains

Persoonia chamaepitys, commonly known as the prostrate- or mountain geebung, is a shrub endemic to New South Wales in eastern Australia. It has a prostrate habit, reaching only 20 cm (7.9 in) high but spreading up to 2 m (6.6 ft) across, with bright green spine-like leaves and small yellow flowers appearing in summer and autumn.

== Description ==
A prostrate shrub, Persoonia chamaepitys reaches to around 20 cm (8 in) high and spreads up to 1–2 m (3.3–6.6 ft) across. The new growth is hairy. The tiny spine-like leaves measure 0.7–1.9 cm long and 0.5–1 mm wide. Flowering occurs over spring and summer (October to January), the small yellow flowers arising from or near the ends of branchlets.

== Taxonomy ==
It was first described by Allan Cunningham in 1825. The origin of the type specimen is unknown. The species name is derived from the Ancient Greek words χαμαί khamaí "on the ground, to the ground", and πίτυς pítys "pine", from resemblance of the foliage to that of pines.

In 1870, George Bentham published the first infrageneric arrangement of Persoonia in Volume 5 of his landmark Flora Australiensis. He divided the genus into three sections, placing P. chamaepitys in P. sect. Amblyanthera. Within the genus Persoonia, P. chamaepitys is classified in the lanceolata group, a group of 54 closely related species with similar flowers but very different foliage. These species will often interbreed with each other where two members of the group occur. Common names include creeping geebung, prostrate geebung, and mountain geebung.

== Distribution and habitat ==
Persoonia chamaepitys is restricted to central New South Wales from the Upper Goulburn Valley south through the Blue Mountains and Woronora Plateau and into the Budawang Range. It is common around Katoomba to Mount Victoria. It grows at an altitude of 360 to 1,100 m (1,180 to 3,610 ft), on sandstone-based soils in heath or dry sclerophyll forest. Those seen in the Blue Mountains seem to originate on a slope or mound.

== Ecology ==
Long-tongue bees of the genera Chalicodoma and Hylaeus and Eumenid wasps forage among the flowers, although only the long-tongue bee species Leioproctus raymenti is a pollinator. The fruit are eaten and scattered by vertebrates, such as kangaroos, possums, and currawongs and other large birds.

Persoonia chamaepitys is killed by bushfire and regenerates from seed that has remained dormant in the soil.

== Cultivation ==
The species is sometimes seen in cultivation, but has proven difficult to propagate from either seed or cuttings. It makes an attractive rockery plant, its bright green foliage and yellow flowers are features.
