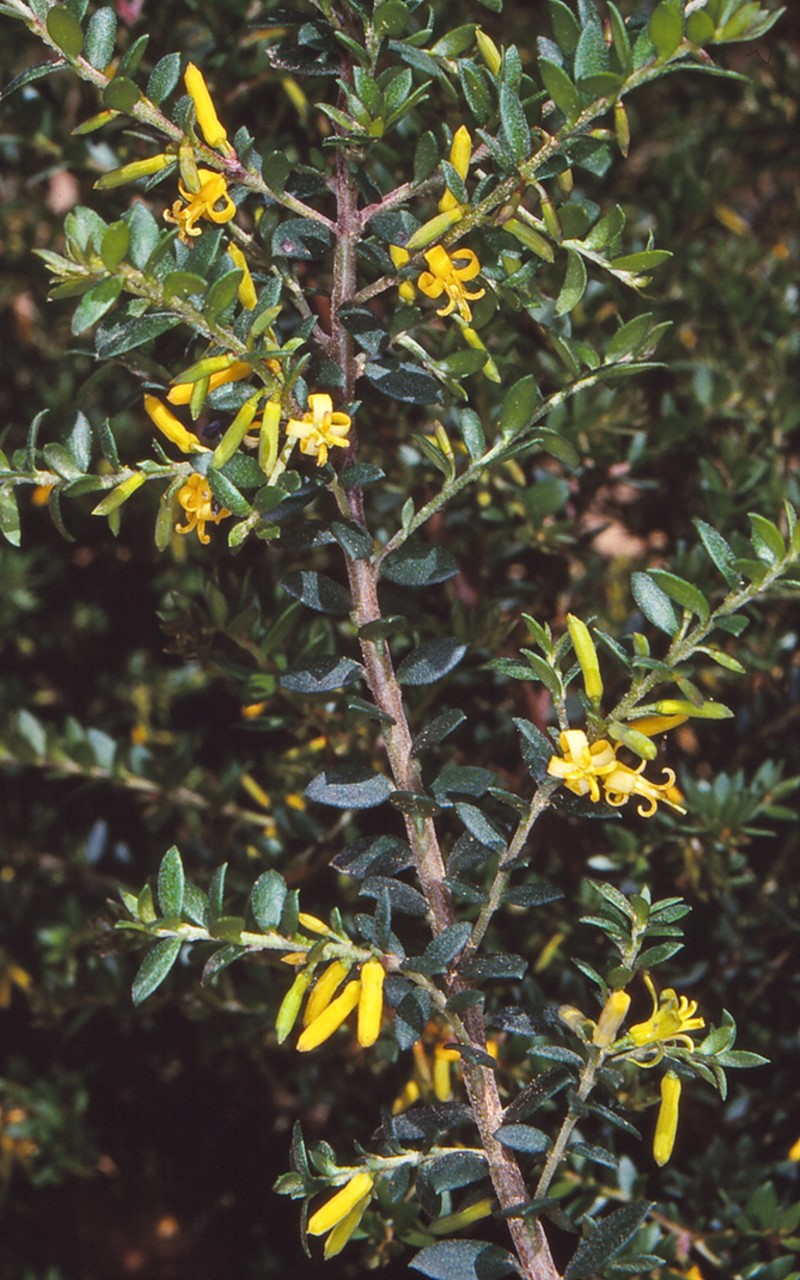
- Persoonia asperula in Wadbilliga National Park

Scientific classification
- Kingdom: Plantae
- Clade: Tracheophytes
- Clade: Angiosperms
- Clade: Eudicots
- Order: Proteales
- Family: Proteaceae
- Genus: Persoonia
- Species: P. asperula

Binomial name
- Persoonia asperula L.A.S.Johnson & P.H.Weston
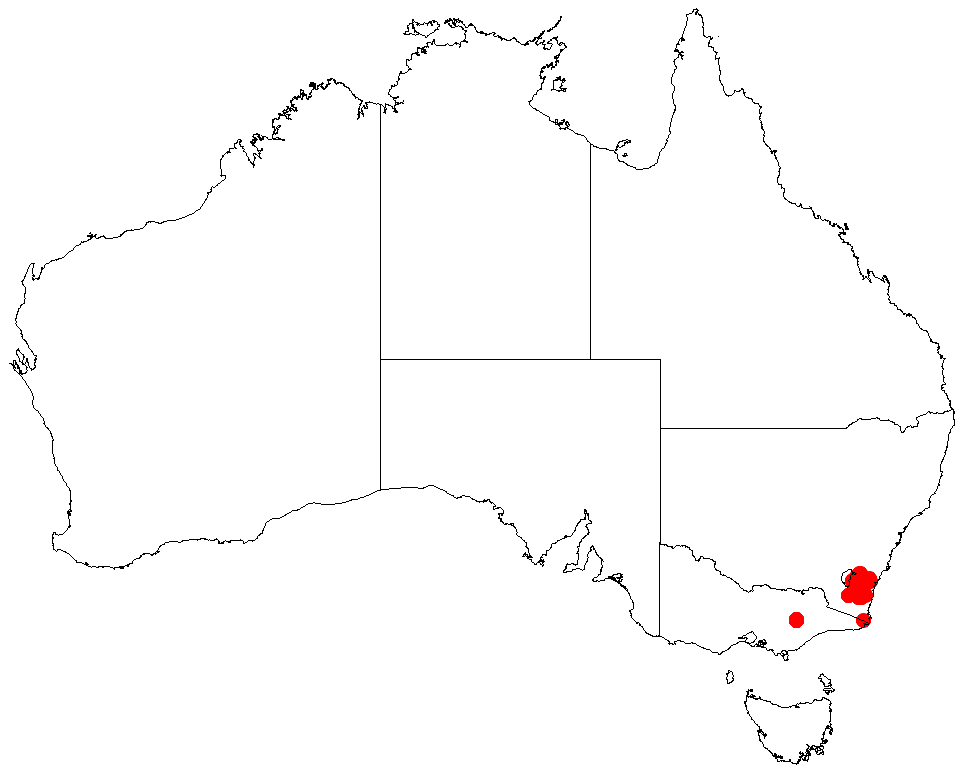
- Occurrence data from Australasian Virtual Herbarium

Synonyms
- Persoonia nutans subsp. g sensu Jacobs & Pickard

= Persoonia asperula =

Mountain geebung

Species of flowering plant

Persoonia asperula, commonly known as mountain geebung, is a plant in the family Proteaceae and is endemic to south-eastern Australia. It is an erect or prostrate shrub with smooth bark, mostly elliptic to oblong leaves and yellow flowers borne singly or in groups of up to nine. It mostly occurs in the Southern Highlands of New South Wales. A small population in Victoria may be a different species.

== Description ==
Persoonia asperula is an erect or prostrate shrub with smooth bark and hairy new growth. The leaves are mostly elliptic to oblong, sometimes egg-shaped, sparsely to moderately hairy, mostly 7–22 mm (0.3–0.9 in) long and 2–6 mm (0.08–0.2 in) wide with edges that curve back. The flowers are borne singly or in groups of up to nine on the ends of the branches which continue to grow after flowering or in leaf axils. Each flower is on the end of a more or less hairy pedicel 1–5 mm (0.04–0.2 in) long and is composed of four hairy tepals 9–11 mm (0.35–0.43 in) long, which are fused at the base but with the tips rolled back. The central style is surrounded by four yellow anthers which are also joined at the base with the tips rolled back, so that it resembles a cross when viewed end-on. Flowering occurs in January and February in the species' native range and is followed by purple-striped fleshy green fruits known as drupes.

== Taxonomy and naming ==
Persoonia asperula was formally described in 1991 by Lawrie Johnson and Peter Weston from a specimen collected near the Back River and Wadbilliga National Park. The description was published in the journal Telopea. The specific epithet (asperula) is the diminutive form of the Latin word aspera meaning "rough", hence "somewhat rough", referring to the leaves.

== Distribution and habitat ==
Mountain geebung occurs in montane heath and wet forest in south-eastern New South Wales south of the Sandhills Range including the Tinderry Range, the Kybean Range and Mount Kydra. A small disjunct population occurs in the Moroka River catchment in Victoria. These have smaller leaves that are 3–8 mm (0.1–0.3 in) long and 1–2 mm (0.04–0.08 in) wide. It is thought that this population may constitute a separate taxon.

Persoonia asperula may be found growing together with P. chamaepeuce, with which it sometimes hybridises, and P. silvatica.

== Conservation ==
This species is listed as "threatened" in Victoria under the Flora and Fauna Guarantee Act 1988 and "endangered" on the Department of Sustainability and Environment's Advisory List of Rare Or Threatened Plants In Victoria.
