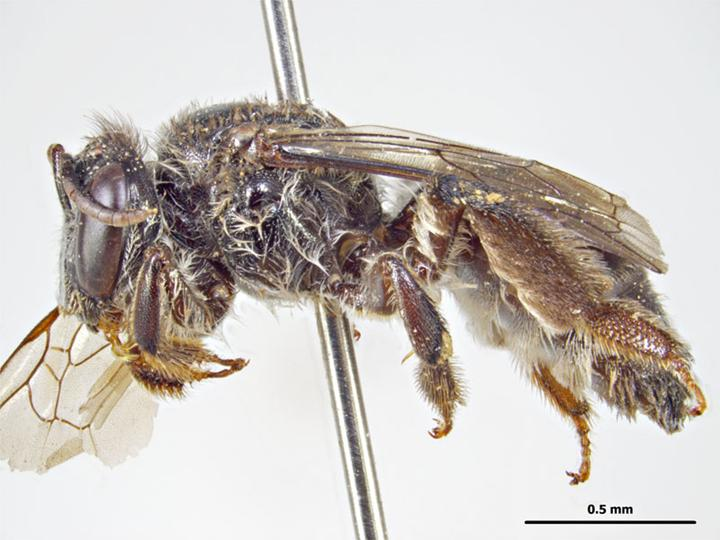
- Female

Scientific classification
- Kingdom: Animalia
- Phylum: Arthropoda
- Clade: Pancrustacea
- Class: Insecta
- Order: Hymenoptera
- Family: Colletidae
- Genus: Leioproctus
- Species: L. raymenti

Binomial name
- Leioproctus raymenti Michener, 1965

Synonyms
- Cladocerapis plumosus Rayment, 1935

= Leioproctus raymenti =

Species of bee

Leioproctus raymenti, or Leioproctus (Cladocerapis) raymenti, is a species of bee in the family Colletidae and subfamily Colletinae. It is endemic to Australia. It was described by American entomologist Charles Duncan Michener in 1965.

== Distribution and habitat ==
The species occurs in south-eastern mainland Australia. The type locality is Monbulk, Victoria.

== Behaviour ==
The adults are solitary flying mellivores that nest in the ground. Flowering plants visited by the bees include Persoonia species.

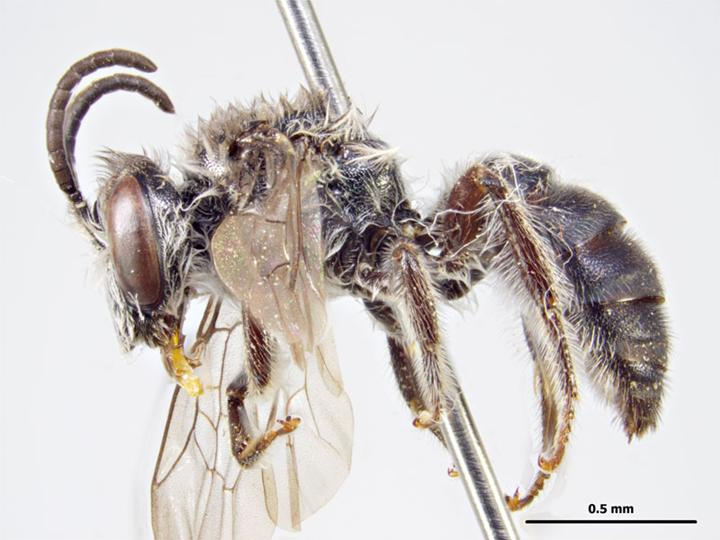
Male
