= John Lhotsky =

Austrian naturalist, lecturer, artist and author (1795-1866)

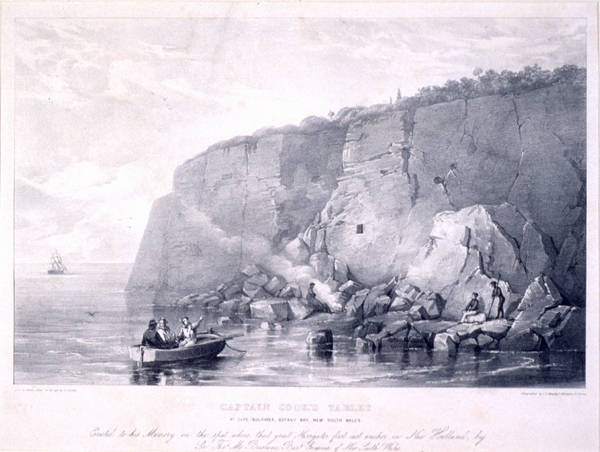
"Captain Cook's tablet at Cape Solander, Botany Bay, New South Wales" published by Lhotsky in 1839

John Lhotsky (1795–1866) was a naturalist born in Galicia (Austrian Empire), lecturer, artist and author. He wrote and published on the topics of zoology, botany, geology, geography and politics. Lhotsky was active in the early colonies of New South Wales and Tasmania from 1832 until 1838. Depending on the context, Lhotsky described himself as Polish, Austrian or German during his time in Australia.

== Early life ==
Lhotsky, whose first name is also given as Joannes Lhotsky, Johann Lhotsky and Jan Lhotsky, was born in Lemberg, Galicia, Austrian Empire (now Lviv, Ukraine), the son of Joseph Lhotsky. He moved to Vienna in 1812 and was awarded his doctorate from the University of Jena. He became a member of the Bavarian Botanical Society during this period. In 1819 he published a botanical work Flora Conchica, and other papers for scientific journals, however, his political writing led to a prison sentence of six years. He was released in 1828.

== Travel to Australia ==
Lhotsky was commissioned, by Ludwig I of Bavaria to explore and describe the 'new world', spending eighteen months in Brazil before travelling to Australia. He landed at Sydney on 18 May 1832, moved to Hobart in 1836, and sailed to London 1838. While in Australia, and after his return to Europe, he published seminal works on a range of topics. In addition to his books and articles, his works include landscape paintings, and zoological and botanical illustrations.

He produced numerous articles for newspapers and scientific journals, describing his investigations of the natural history of Australia. His first work on this topic is supposed to have been 'Australian sketches, no l', anonymously published in the Sydney Gazette. The account of his expedition, A Journey from Sydney to the Australian Alps, was important for the description of the Monaro region and Snowy River. One article, Song of the Women of the Menero Tribe, gives the earliest specimen of Australian music. Lhotsky also visited the site of the future capital, Canberra, and was the first to note the name 'Kembery' from which it derived. His unpublished works include a vocabulary of the Tasmanian peoples. He published art criticism in Sydney from 1834 onwards, and is noted as the first to do so, describing the possibilities of the Australian landscape as a subject and its absence in the colony's active artists. Lhotsky obtained an interview with William Buckley. The volume Illustrations of the Present State and Future Prospects of New South Wales (1835–36) was published by William Moffit with coloured plates, and gave the "State of Agriculture and Grazing in New South Wales".

Lhotsky made important scientific collections and discoveries while in Australia, although he did not succeed in gaining the posts he sought as the official zoologist or naturalist. He attempted to sell his scientific specimens to the authorities, for the foundation of a collection at the Australian Museum, but his offer was rejected with a comment that the price was too high. Lhotsky made early collections of Alpine flora in New South Wales, and arranged a collection of 200 species from Tasmania. He also collected mineralogical samples and specimens of the native fauna. These early collections were advertised, and sold from his private concern, the "Australian Philosophical Repository". Lhotsky's works in Australia include the completion of a geological map of the Tasman Peninsula. He has also been credited as the first discoverer of gold in New South Wales, although his later attempts to seek reward for this failed. His artwork was also advertised and raffled, depicting scenes of the Australian landscape and its unique flora.

== After Australia ==
After arriving in London he wrote The state of arts in New South Wales and Van Diemen's Land, the first review of art in Australia. Many of the scientific illustrations produced by Lhotsky, such as those of fishes, were thought to have been commissioned; the lithographs and other printed works credited to him were often derived from the sketches he received from convicts. Lhotsky also wrote a biographical sketch on Ferdinand Bauer, whom he greatly admired, for the London Journal of Botany, and placed letters from Bauer, written on the Investigator expedition to Australia, with the Linnean Society of London. His sketch of the highly regarded botanical illustrator was the earliest source of biographical information, the only one for a century after Bauer's death. After his arrival in London, Lhotsky continued to publish material on politics and social commentary, as he had in Vienna and Australia. He died at the Dalston German Hospital in London on 23 November 1866 in apparent dire poverty.

Lhotsky was variously appreciated or damned in the colonies. He was frequently published in local newspapers and, later, castigated in the same. His public disputes with officials led to his leaving New South Wales for Tasmania, then two years later for London. He published many articles on his discoveries and experience in Australia for a public eager for information on the colonies, but some of this was described as slanderous in the Sydney Gazette. He found critics in London too. Impey Murchison described him as the "mad Pole". Later commentators recognised the contribution of the scientist and that his failures were due to indiscretion with his monies and criticism.

The genus Lhotskia, of the family of fish Belonidae, was named for this author, as were the species of shrubs Lhotskya, later transferred to Calytrix.
