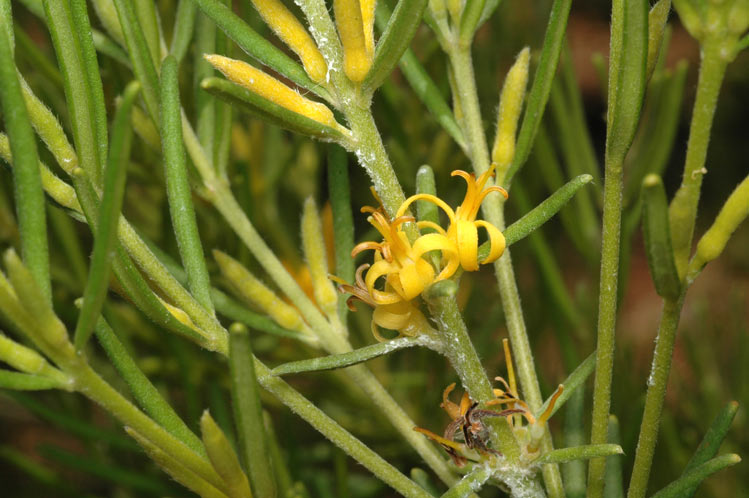
- In the Australian National Botanic Gardens

Scientific classification
- Kingdom: Plantae
- Clade: Tracheophytes
- Clade: Angiosperms
- Clade: Eudicots
- Order: Proteales
- Family: Proteaceae
- Genus: Persoonia
- Species: P. curvifolia

Binomial name
- Persoonia curvifolia R.Br.
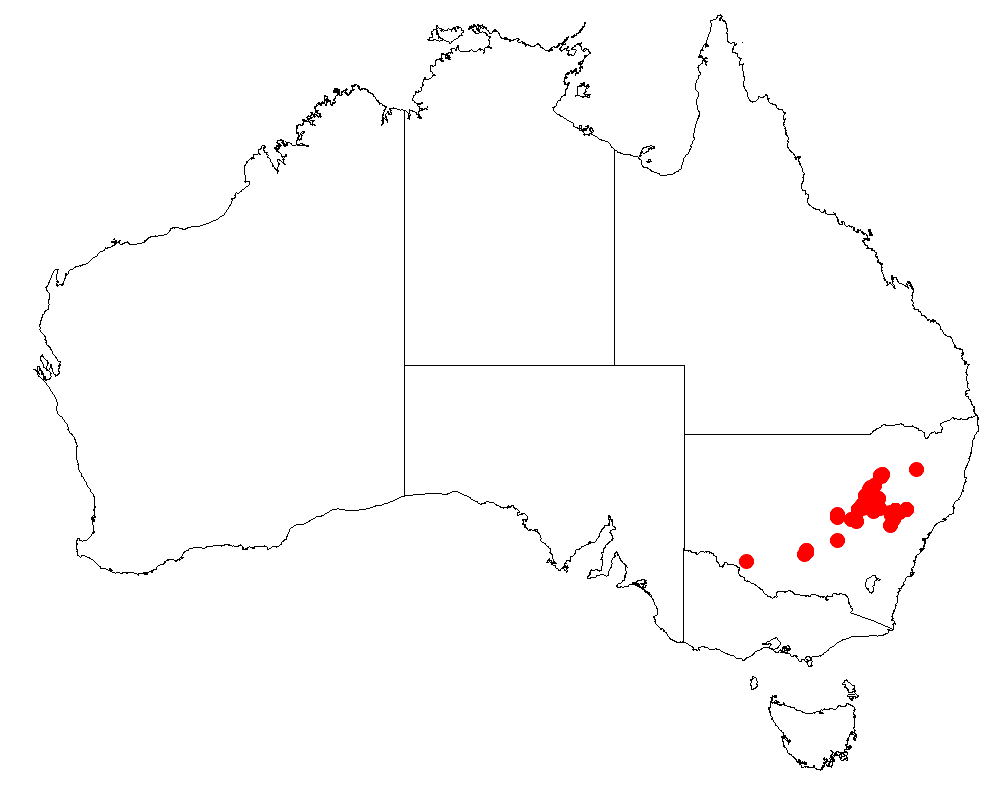
- Occurrence data from Australasian Virtual Herbarium

Synonyms
- Linkia curvifolia (R.Br.) Kuntze; Persoonia abietina Meisn.

= Persoonia curvifolia =

Species of shrub

Persoonia curvifolia is a plant in the family Proteaceae and is endemic to central New South Wales. It is an erect to spreading shrub with linear leaves and somewhat hairy yellow flowers.

== Description ==
Persoonia curvifolia is an erect to spreading shrub with smooth bark and young branches and leaves that are hairy when young. The leaves are linear, 10–50 mm (0.39–1.97 in) long, 0.5–1.3 mm (0.020–0.051 in) wide and grooved on the lower surface. The flowers are arranged in groups of up to eighteen along a rachis 5–50 mm (0.20–1.97 in) long, each flower on a hairy pedicel 2–3 mm (0.079–0.118 in) long. The tepals are yellow, 10–13 mm (0.39–0.51 in) long and sparsely to moderately hairy on the outside.

== Taxonomy and naming ==
Persoonia curvifolia was first formally described in 1830 by Robert Brown in Supplementum primum Prodromi florae Novae Hollandiae from specimens collected near Port Jackson by "D. Cunningham".

The Wiradjuri people of New South Wales use the name bumbadula for the species.

== Distribution and habitat ==
This persoonia grows in woodland and forest south from the Warrumbungles and Goulburn River in New South Wales and south to the Cocoparra National Park at altitudes between 180 and 500 m (590 and 1,640 ft).
