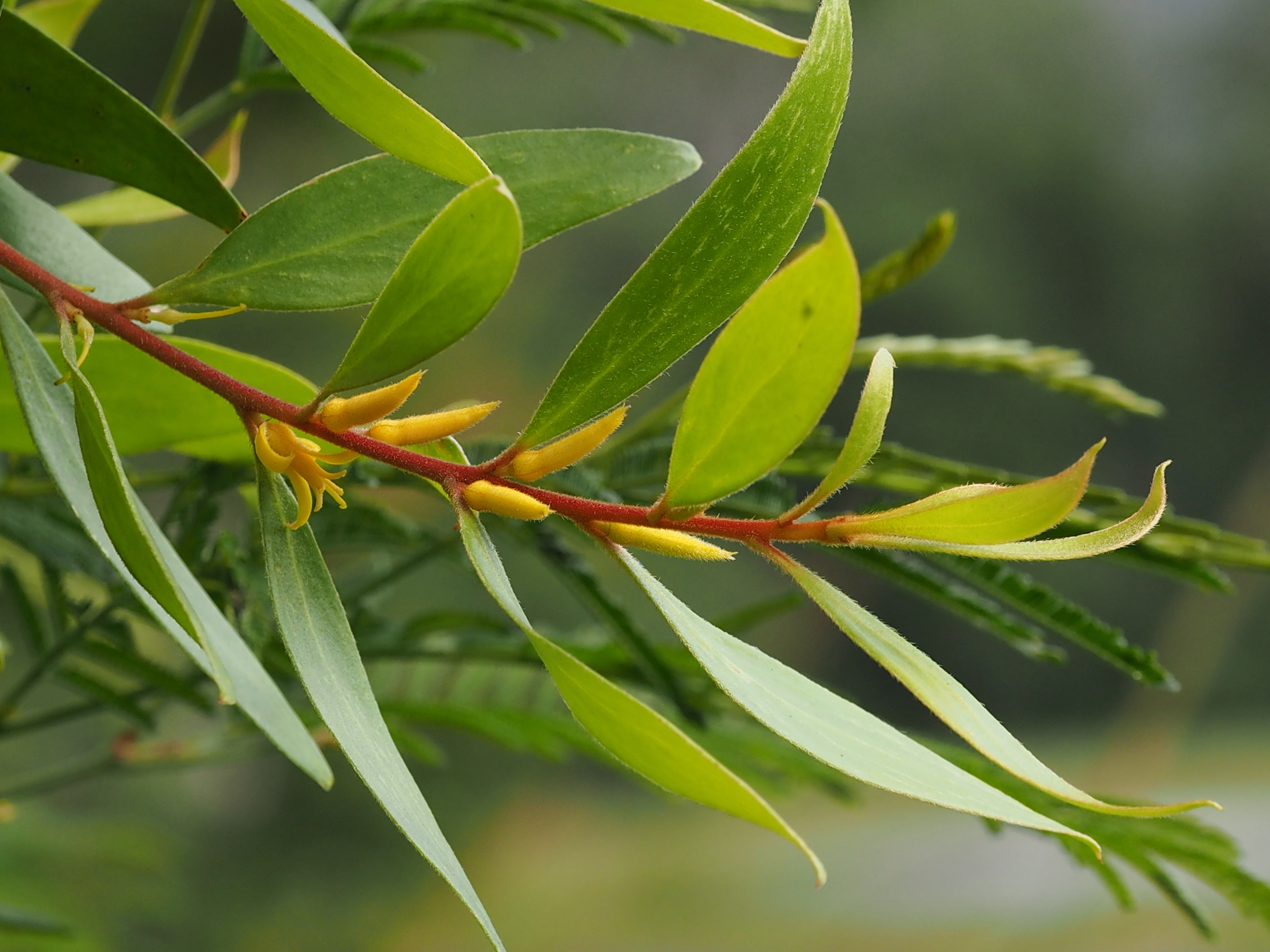

Scientific classification
- Kingdom: Plantae
- Clade: Tracheophytes
- Clade: Angiosperms
- Clade: Eudicots
- Order: Proteales
- Family: Proteaceae
- Genus: Persoonia
- Species: P. conjuncta

Binomial name
- Persoonia conjuncta L.A.S.Johnson & P.H.Weston
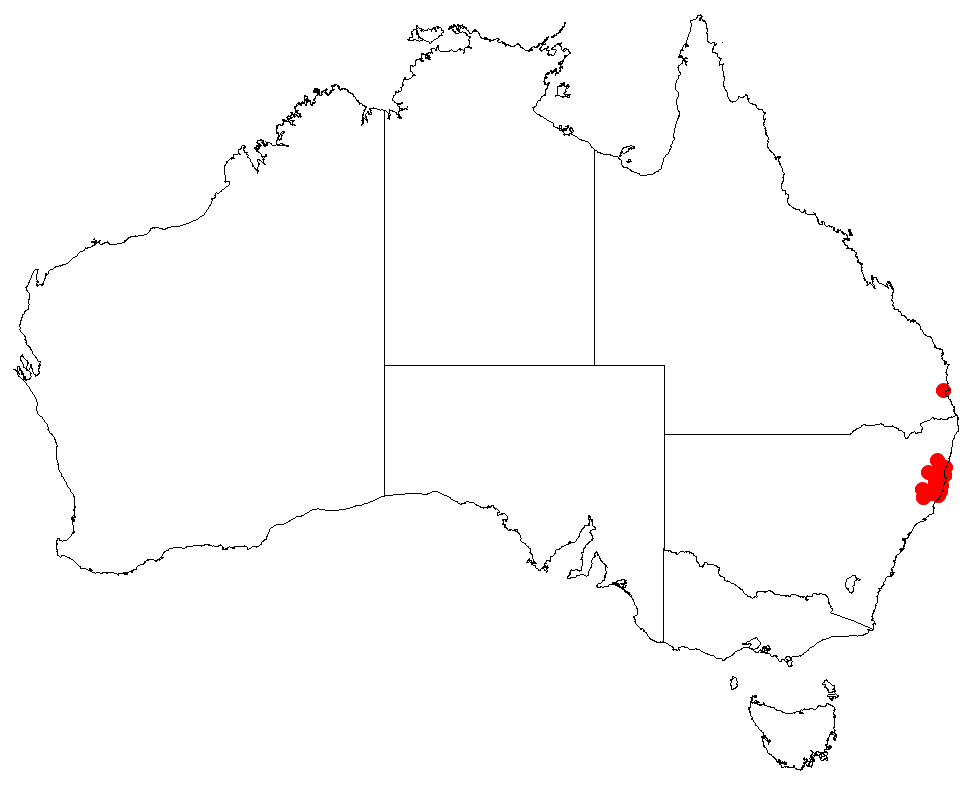
- Occurrence data downloaded from AVH

= Persoonia conjuncta =

Species of flowering plant

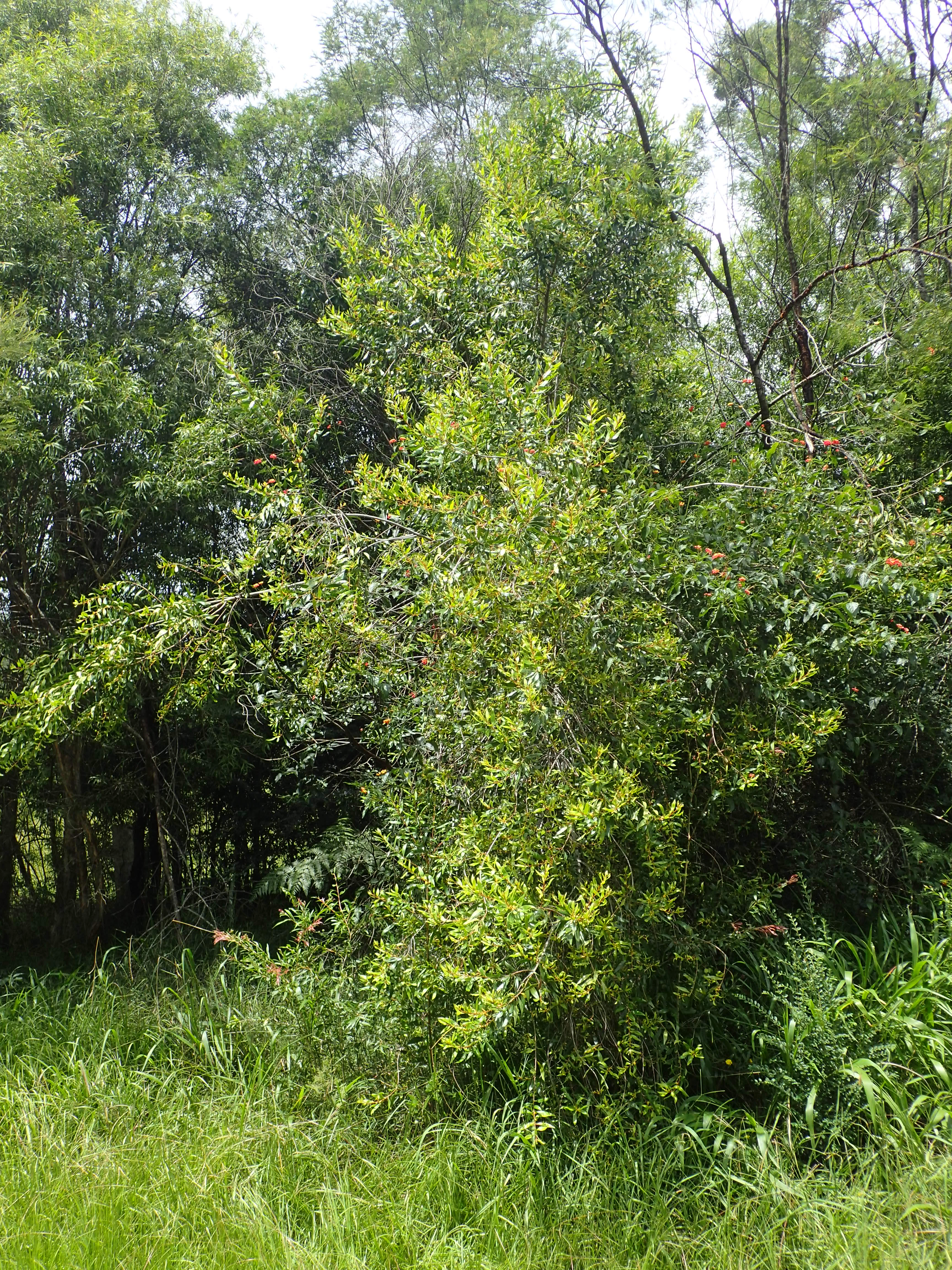
Near Nana Glen

Persoonia conjuncta is a species of flowering plant in the family Proteaceae and is endemic to eastern New South Wales. It is an erect shrub or small tree with narrow elliptic to lance-shaped leaves, yellow, tube-shaped flowers in groups of up to sixteen and green fruit.

== Description ==
Persoonia conjuncta is an erect shrub or small tree that typically grows to a height of 2–7 m (6 ft 7 in – 23 ft 0 in) and smooth bark, finely fissured near the base. The leaves are narrow elliptic to lance-shaped, 60–140 mm (2.4–5.5 in) long and 10–26 mm (0.39–1.02 in) wide. The flowers are arranged in groups of up to sixteen along a rachis up to 140 mm (5.5 in) long that grows into a leafy shoot after flowering, each flower on a pedicel 2–6 mm (0.079–0.236 in) long. The tepals are yellow, 12–13 mm (0.47–0.51 in) long and hairy on the outside. Flowering occurs from January to February and the fruit is a green drupe.

== Taxonomy ==
Persoonia conjuncta was first formally described in 1991 by Lawrie Johnson and Peter Weston in the journal Telopea from specimens collected by Johnson on Mount Yarrahapinni (near Kempsey) in 1980.

== Distribution and habitat ==
This geebung grows in forest on the coastal ranges in the Coffs Harbour district and south to the Manning River in eastern New South Wales.
