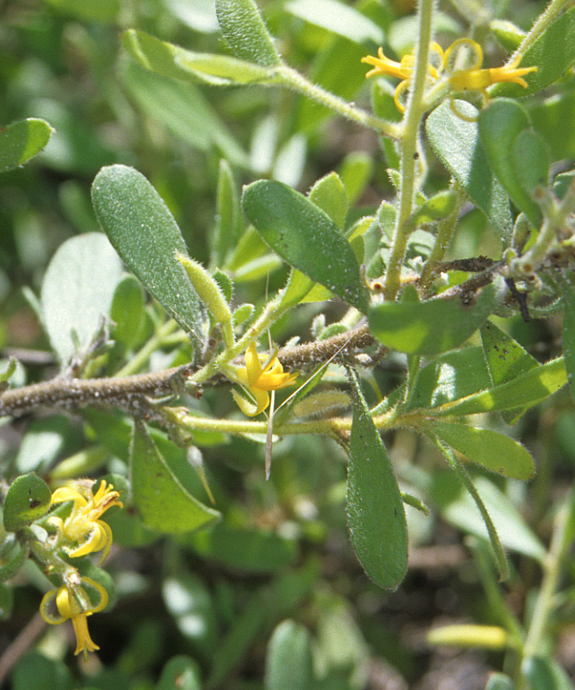
- Persoonia sericea near Carnarvon Gorge

Scientific classification
- Kingdom: Plantae
- Clade: Tracheophytes
- Clade: Angiosperms
- Clade: Eudicots
- Order: Proteales
- Family: Proteaceae
- Genus: Persoonia
- Species: P. sericea

Binomial name
- Persoonia sericea A.Cunn. ex R.Br.

= Persoonia sericea =

Silky geebung

Species of shrub

Persoonia sericea, commonly known as the silky geebung, is a plant in the family Proteaceae and is endemic to eastern Australia. It is a shrub with hairy yellow flowers and silky-hairy young branches and leaves.

== Description ==
Persoonia sericea is an erect to spreading shrub with its leaves and young branches covered with soft, silky hairs. The leaves are lance-shaped to egg-shaped, with the narrower end towards the base or elliptic to spatula-shaped and are 15–60 mm (0.6–2 in) long and 2–21 mm (0.08–0.8 in) wide. The flowers are hairy and are arranged singly or in small groups in leaf axils on a pedicel 2–12 mm (0.08–0.5 in) long. The flower is composed of four tepals 9–11 mm (0.4–0.4 in) long, which are fused at the base but with the tips rolled back. The central style is surrounded by four yellow anthers which are also joined at the base with the tips rolled back, so that it resembles a cross when viewed end-on. The ovary is densely hairy.

== Taxonomy and naming ==
Persoonia sericea was first formally described in 1830 by Robert Brown from an unpublished description by Allan Cunningham. The type specimen was collected near the Lachlan River by Cunningham and the description was published in Supplementum primum Prodromi florae Novae Hollandiae. The specific epithet (sericea) is a Latin word meaning "silky".

== Distribution and habitat ==
Silky geebung grows in woodland and forest north from Grenfell in New South Wales and in south-eastern Queensland.

== Ecology ==
Clumps of young seedlings of P. sericea have been observed emerging from decaying kangaroo dung near Brisbane.
