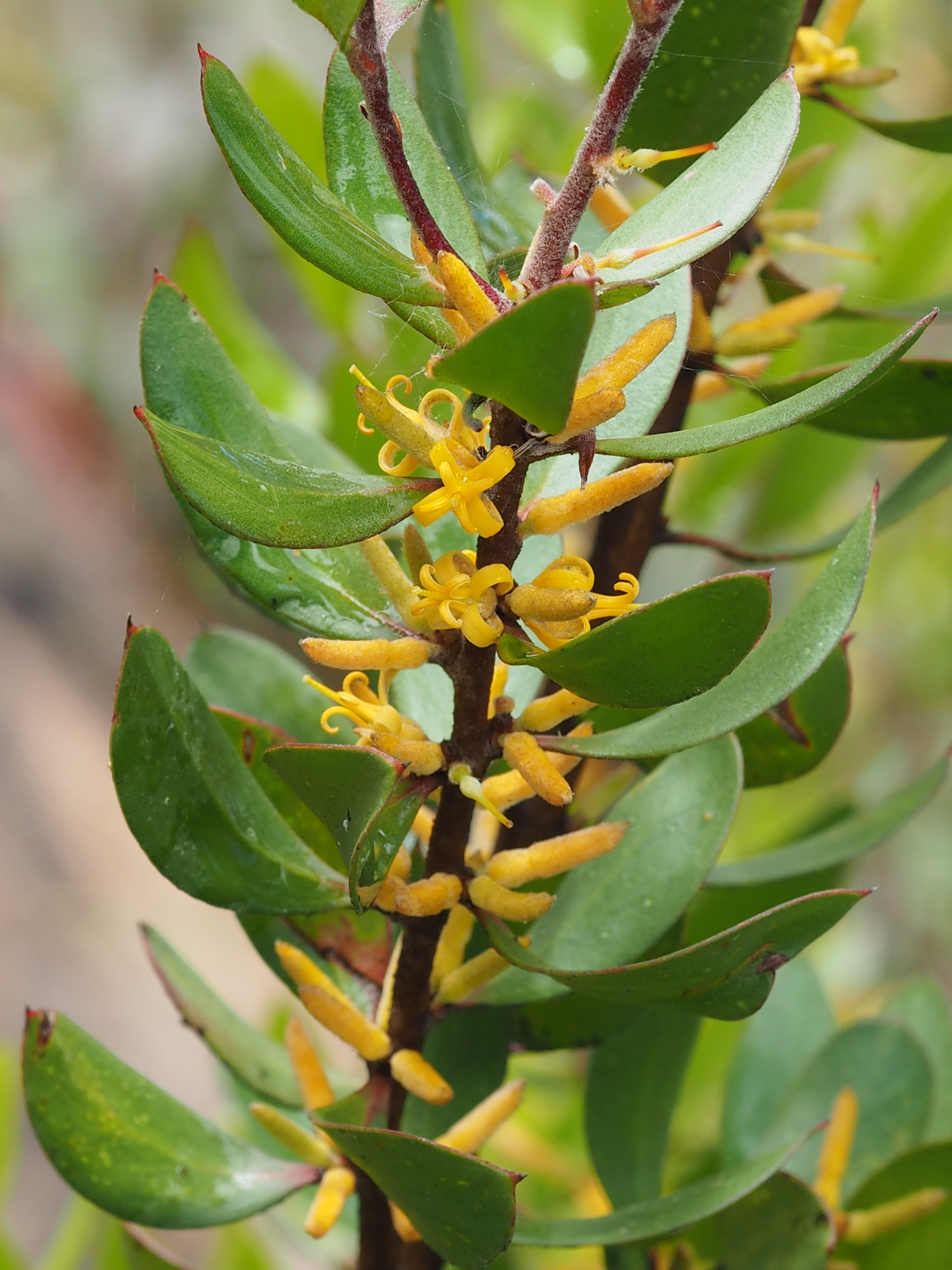

Scientific classification
- Kingdom: Plantae
- Clade: Tracheophytes
- Clade: Angiosperms
- Clade: Eudicots
- Order: Proteales
- Family: Proteaceae
- Genus: Persoonia
- Species: P. oleoides

Binomial name
- Persoonia oleoides L.A.S.Johnson & P.H.Weston

Synonyms
- Persoonia oxycoccoides var. longifolia Benth.

= Persoonia oleoides =

Species of flowering plant

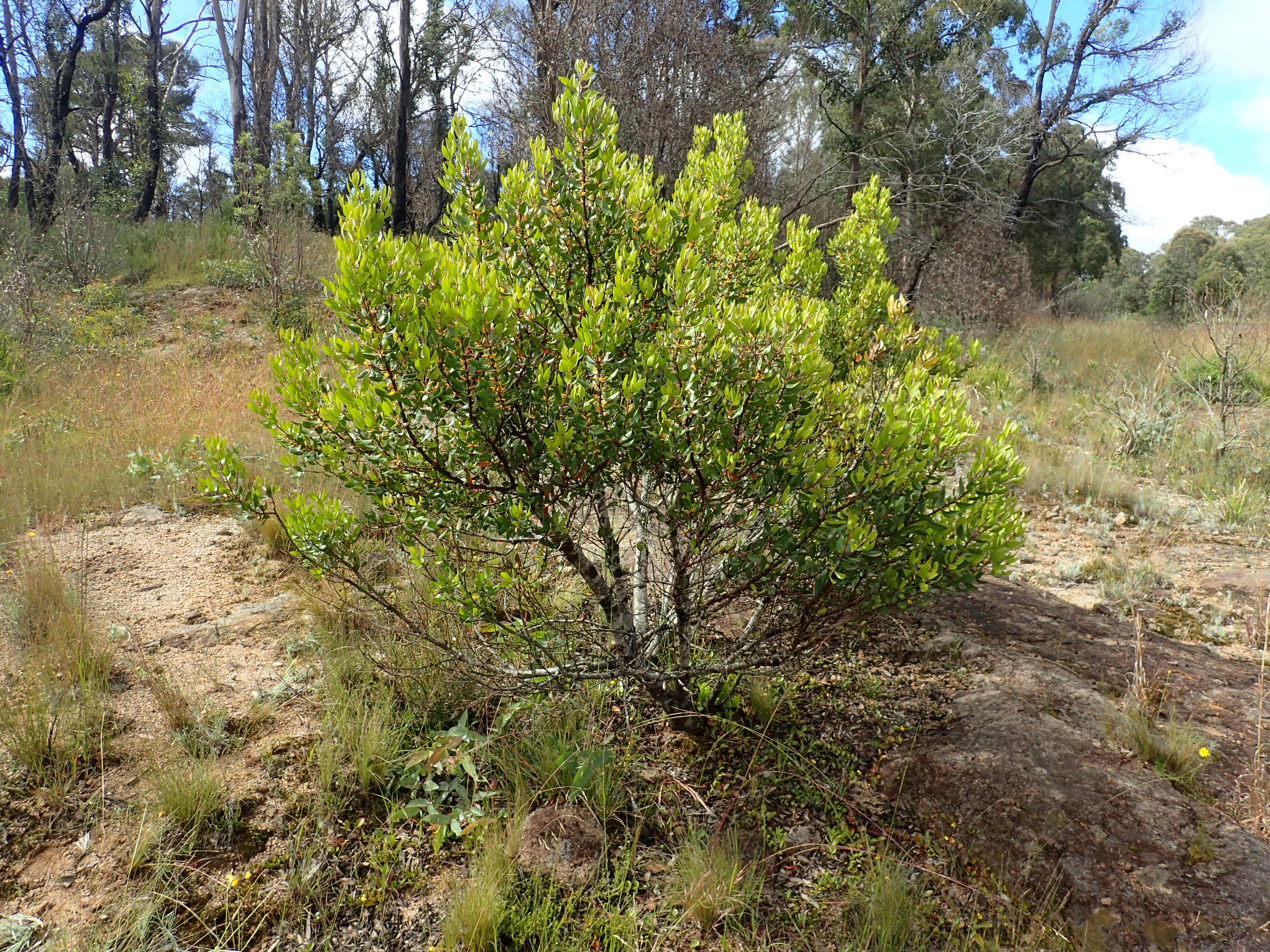
Habit near Cathedral Rock National Park

Persoonia oleoides is a species of flowering plant in the family Proteaceae. It is endemic to north-eastern New South Wales, Australia. It is an erect to low-lying shrub with oblong to egg-shaped leaves and yellow flowers in groups of up to twenty-five on a rachis up to 130 mm (5.1 in) long.

== Description ==
Persoonia oleoides is an erect to low-lying shrub that typically grows to a height of 0.2–1 m (7.9 in – 3 ft 3.4 in) and has smooth bark with young branchlets covered with greyish to rust-coloured hairs. The leaves are arranged alternately, oblong to elliptical, egg-shaped or spatula-shaped, 20–60 mm (0.79–2.36 in) long and 4–15 mm (0.16–0.59 in) wide. The flowers are arranged in leaf axils or on the ends of branches, sometimes on a rachis with a dormant bud on the end, sometimes on a rachis that continues to grow into a leafy branch. In the first case, there are up to three flowers on a rachis up to 10 mm (0.39 in) long. In the case of a rachis that grows into a leafy shoot, there are up to twenty-five flowers on a rachis up to 130 mm (5.1 in) long. Each flower is on a pedicel 1–3 mm (0.039–0.118 in) long, the tepals are yellow, hairy and 10–15 mm (0.39–0.59 in) long. Flowering occurs from January to February and the fruit is a green drupe, sometimes with purple stripes.

== Taxonomy ==
Persoonia oleoides was first formally described in 1991 by Lawrie Johnson and Peter Weston in the journal Telopea.

== Distribution and habitat ==
This geebung grows in forest between the upper Clarence River, the upper Macleay River and Barrington Tops in eastern New South Wales.
