= Thistle Yolette Harris =

Australian botanist

Thistle Harris AM
- Born: 29 July 1902; Sydney, Australia
- Died: 5 July 1990 (aged 87); Summer Hill, New South Wales, Australia
- Education: University of Sydney; University of New South Wales; University of Melbourne
- Awards: Australian Natural History Medallion (1963); Honorary Doctorate of Science by the University of Wollongong (1985)
- Scientific career
- Fields: Botany
- Workplaces: Sydney Teachers' College; University of Sydney; Sydney Technical College

Thistle Yolette Harris AM (29 July 1902 – 5 July 1990), was born as Yolette Thistle Harris, but mostly known as Thistle Stead, was an Australian botanist, educator, author and conservationist.

== Biography ==
She was one of three daughters born to Charles Thomas Harris and Illma Richardson Harris (née Rokes). She was educated at SCECGS Redlands, Cremorne, where she was taught by the English teacher, Constance Le Plastrier (1864–1938), who was a member of the Naturalists Society of New South Wales and co-author of Botany for Australian Students (1916), and helped foster Harris' interest in native plants. Harris died in 1990 at a nursing home in Summer Hill, New South Wales.

== Education ==
Harris studied botany at the University of Sydney, graduating with a degree in botany in 1924 followed by a diploma of education in 1925 from Sydney Teachers College. After several years as a science teacher in secondary schools, she became a lecturer in science education at Sydney Teachers' College (1938–61). In 1945 she was awarded a Master of Education degree from the University of Melbourne and studied for a Diploma in Landscape Design at the University of New South Wales between 1968 and 1969. Harris later featured her efforts to revegetate the mine-workings at the Central Mine of the Sulphide Corporation in her book Australian Plants for the Garden (1953). Harris also lectured on Biological Science at University of Sydney and on Botany at Sydney Technical College.

According to John Walter, her interest in Australian plants was also developed when she met Albert Morris (1886-1939) while she taught at the school in Broken Hill between 1929 and 1930.

== Marriage ==
In 1951 she married pioneer conservationist and marine biologist David Stead, to whom she had been introduced by Le Plastrier in 1918, when she was sixteen. By marrying Stead she became the second stepmother to the Australian novelist and short-story writer, Christina Stead. Stead was twenty-five years older than Harris and died six years after their marriage.

== Work ==
Harris was a member of the Australian Institute of Landscape Architects and she served as President and Honorary Secretary of the Wildlife Preservation Society of Australia. She was instrumental in facilitating the publication of the Society's journal Australian Wild Life, which was issued intermittently from 1934. She authored twelve books on Australian flora and their cultivation in suburban gardens. Harris's first book, Wildflowers of Australia (1938), provided a popular flora of Australia and included studies of approximately 250 plants. Her book, Gardening with Australian Plants, Shrubs (1977), describes over 100 genera covering 600 species.

In 1963 Harris established the 50 ha Wirrimbirra Sanctuary at Bargo, New South Wales, in memory of her late husband, who had died in 1957. She also established the David G. Stead Memorial Wildlife Research Foundation of Australia to undertake its management. In 1965 she donated the property to the National Trust of Australia (NSW) and it is managed by the Foundation. With financial assistance from the Gould League of New South Wales, a building was erected on the property in 1971 to act as a Field Studies Centre and in 1973, a teacher from the Education Department was appointed to be a full-time education officer. Harris devoted herself to many causes, especially focused in conservation.

In 1963 she was awarded the Field Naturalists Club of Victoria's Australian Natural History Medallion. In 1985 she was awarded an Honorary Doctorate of Science by the University of Wollongong.

In 1980 her work in wildlife conservation was recognised with the award of Member of the Order of Australia.

== Oral history ==
Harris was interviewed twice during her lifetime, once in 1972 by Hazel de Berg, and another in 1987 by Catherine Johnson. Both interviews relate to her early life, conservation career, personal life, and travel. The recordings can be found at the National Library of Australia.

== Publications ==
Books authored by Harris include:

- 1939 – Wildflowers of Australia, illustrated by Adam Forster. Angus & Robertson: Sydney. (With several later editions).
- 1945 – Nature Problems. A book of nature study for young Australians. Brooks & Co: Sydney.
- 1953 – Australian Plants for the Garden. A handbook on the cultivation of Australian trees, shrubs, other flowering plants, and ferns. Angus & Robertson: Sydney.
- 1956 – Naturecraft in Australia; a guide for the nature-lover, the bushwalker, the student, and the teacher. Angus & Robertson: Sydney.
- 1962 – Eastern Australian Wildflowers. Angus & Robertson Limited.
- 1966 – Around Australia Program - Australian Plant Life. Nelson Doubleday.
- 1970 – Alpine Plants of Australia Including Subalpine and Montane Plants. Angus & Robertson: Sydney. ISBN 0-207-12071-4
- 1976 – The Ellis Stones Garden Book: Australian Landscape Gardening. Nelson: Melbourne. (With Ellis Stones).
- 1977 – Gardening With Australian Plants: Shrubs. Nelson: Melbourne. ISBN 0-17-005119-6
- 1979 – Gardening With Australian Plants: Small Plants and Climbers. Nelson: Melbourne. ISBN 0-17-005120-X
- 1980 – Gardening With Australian Plants: Trees. Nelson: Melbourne. ISBN 0-17-005121-8
