= Lydham Hall =

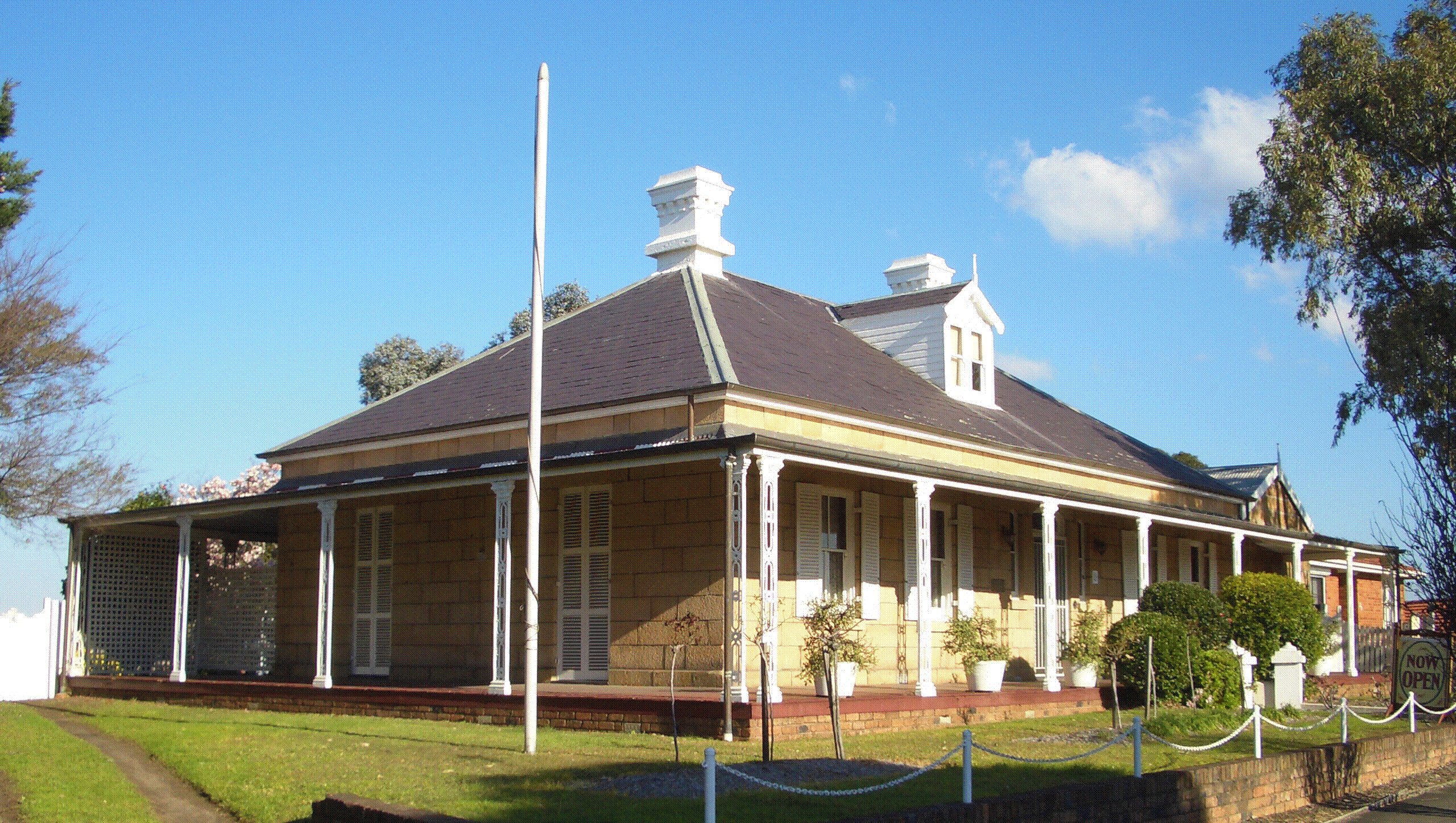

- Location within Sydney Location within Australia
- 33°56′42″S 151°07′48″E
- Location: 18 Lydham Avenue, Rockdale, New South Wales, Australia

History
- Built: after 1861

Site notes
- Owner: Bayside Council
- Website: stgeorgehistsoc.org.au/lydham-hall/

New South Wales Heritage Register
- Official name: Lydham Hall; Lydham; Lydham Hill; Lydham Hall Museum; Lydham Hall Historic House and Museum
- Type: State heritage (built)
- Designated: 2 April 1999
- Reference no.: 477
- Type: House
- Category: Museum

Lydham Hall is a state heritage-listed former rural residence at 18 Lydham Avenue, Rockdale in New South Wales, Australia. The house is currently used as a local museum holding a collection of furniture and objects dated from the 1860s. Run by the St George Historical Society, it is opened to the public on the first Sunday of every month.

The parcel of land where the house now stands was originally part of the 1200 acres named Bexley granted to James Chandler. Joseph Davis purchased the site in November 1859. The property was initially named Lidham Hill, but the house within the current land parcel later became known as Lydham Hall. The building was completed in 1878-1879. It stands on the highest point of land between the Cooks River and the Georges River. The street previously known as Joseph Street was re-named Lydham Avenue in 1917 at the request of one of the neighbouring property owners. In 1970, Lydham Hall was purchased by the Rockdale Municipal Council. Since the 2016 council amalgamation, the property has been owned by the Bayside Council. Initially, Permanent Conservation Order No 477 in pursuance of section 44 of the Heritage Act 1977 was applied to the property on 20 August 1986. Since the implementation of the New South Wales State Heritage Register in 1999, Lydham Hall has been included on the State Heritage Register and Council's Local Environmental Plan.

== History ==
The parcel of land on which Lydham Hall stands was part of the original 1200 acres of land granted to James Chandler which was named Bexley. Chandler's agricultural ventures were not successful and eventually the property was mortgaged, subdivided and sold.

On 1 November 1859, wealthy master butcher, Joseph Davis bought 67 acres of Chandler's original grant. Davis used the property for resting and fattening cattle before slaughtering them in his Arncliffe slaughter-house on land in Arncliffe he purchased six months earlier.

Joseph Davis was born in the village of Brede in Sussex in 1826, came to New South Wales in 1847 and set up business in Newtown, possibly first as a publican and then as a butcher. On 28 October 1850, he married 17 year old Ellen Turner at Scots Church, Sydney. They had seven children, all born between 1851 and 1875.

Davis was also a prominent man in Bexley and a generous benefactor to Christ Church, Bexley. He was one of the petitioners who advocated in 1885 and 1886 for the establishment of a local school in the area. The school, currently known as Bexley Public School, was open in 1887.

Davis engaged local Swedish stonemasons, the Benson brothers, to construct a house on the highest point of the estate to have sweeping views of Botany Bay. The house was built "sometime between 1872 and 1879 with its completion and opening taking place between 10 June 1878 and 10 June 1879 or very shortly afterwards".

In 1882, Davis applied to convert the land to Torrens Title, and began to subdivide and sell his land. The streets formed as a result of this subdivision were named after Davis' two youngest sons, Frederick and Herbert, and his eldest grandson, Clarence.

After Joseph Davis' death, Ellen Davis finalised the subsequent subdivision and sold Lydham Hill to Frederick John Gibbins, a successful oyster merchant and trawling magnate, who lived nearby at Dappeto (now known as Macquarie Lodge). Ellen Davis moved to Newtown and died in her residence at Kensington House, 98 Wilson Street, Newtown, in 1906. Davis' second son, also Joseph Davis, ran the original butcher's shop at 255-257 King Street, Newtown.

Gibbins leased out Lydham Hill up until 1907. When his daughter Ada married David George Stead, a widower and father of Australian writer Christina Stead, the newly-weds and Christina settled in Lydham Hill, paying "a very small rent".

During the following ten years, Ada gave birth to six children. A great storyteller, young Christina would entertain her half brothers and sisters with tales and poems. A few of Christina's short stories and her most known and popular work, The Man Who Loved Children, were based on her experiences while living in Lydham Hall in 1910-1917. Lydham Hall is the only house in Australia open to the public where Christina Stead lived.

Gibbins died in 1917 and left no particular instructions for Lydham Hill. Sometime before the Steads moved out in 1917, the property became known as Lydham Hall. Dealings with all Gibbins' properties were left at the discretion of the executors of his will, oldest daughter Emma (Pattison) and son-in-law and accountant, husband of Gibbins' daughter Amy, William Thom. Thom and Pattison subdivided and sold both Dappeto and Lydham Hill. The Steads moved to Watsons Bay.

Lydham Hall was purchased by the Rockdale Municipal Council in 1970 in order "to preserve the building", and was opened on 20 February 1971 to the public as a museum. The purchase and museum opening were part of the Rockdale Municipality centenary celebration. It became a home to the first and only local museum within the area. The Lydham Hall Historic House and Museum houses a collection consisting largely of items donated by the local and wider community, and displays furniture on loan from the National Trust of Australia (NSW). The establishment of the museum and its collection became the longest social project that combined the efforts of the local residents, the local council and the St George Historical Society.

== Description ==
The building of Lydham Hall commenced no earlier than 1875, and was completed no later than 1879. This well preserved example of the early Australian rural homestead contains four large rooms, each 14x20' with a 10' wide centrally placed hall. A narrow staircase at the southern side of the hall reaches two upper rooms, each 18' 6" square lit by near dormer windows. Full length windows face north, east and south to take advantage of the cool sea breezes whilst those facing west are conventionally smaller to keep the hot westerlies at bay.

A verandah once extended around all four sides of the house supported on open work cast iron columns. The hip roof of the house is covered with blue slates and there are a series of small decorated brackets beneath the narrow eaves. The two wide chimneys are of unusual design and each has a drip skirt placed above the flashing.
