= Stead Foundation =

David G. Stead Memorial Wildlife Research Foundation of Australia
- Founder: Thistle Yolette Stead
- Type: NGO
- Purpose: Conservation and environmental advocacy and education
- Key people: David George Stead

The David G. Stead Memorial Wildlife Research Foundation of Australia (or Stead Wildlife Foundation or Stead Foundation) is an Australian non-profit organisation that aims to promote conservation and environment advocacy and education. Established in 1963 as a memorial to David George Stead, a pioneer conservationist and marine biologist throughout the early 20th century, the Stead Foundation is a project-based organisation. Its inaugural and most enduring project was the establishment of the Wirrimbirra Sanctuary, gifted to the National Trust of Australia (New South Wales) in 1965.

The Foundation boasts a list of leading conservationists as supporters and board members. The Stead Foundation receives no recurrent government funding and relies on grants, donations and bequests.

== Wirrimbirra Sanctuary ==
Wirrimbirra Sanctuary is a property of the National Trust of Australia (New South Wales), established in Macarthur, New South Wales and managed as a wildlife refuge by the Stead Foundation. Created in the 1960s by Thistle Stead to preserve the native 'Bargo Brush', a thick dense brushland covering the Bargo Plateau. It was a haven for escaped convicts during early settlement and a hazard for travellers heading towards the rich grazing grounds of the Southern Highlands, and promote education and propagation of Australian native plants, Wirrimbirra operates as a flora and fauna reserve, native plant nursery, education and research centre, listed on the NSW State Heritage Register.

Wirrimbirra has about 95 hectares (230 acres) of preserved native bush and gardens. Wandering the paths of the sanctuary, including the Fauna Protection Area, for encounters with endangered species and plants from around Australia. You will also see wallabies, kangaroos, emus and maybe echidnas, possums, a wide variety of birds and other native animals in natural habitats. The sanctuary has walking trails, an environmental studies centre, visitors centre, native plant nursery and picnic areas. The environmental studies centre (known as a field studies centre at the time of creation) was established with the support of the Gould League who helped raise funds for the first classroom on the site.

== See also ==
- Bush Heritage Australia
- National Trust of Australia
- Wildlife Preservation Society of Australia
