= Miss Herbert (The Suburban Wife) =

Book by Christina Stead

- First edition
- Author: Christina Stead
- Language: English
- Genre: Literary fiction
- Publisher: Random House
- Publication date: 1976
- Publication place: Australia
- Media type: Print
- Pages: 308pp
- ISBN: 039440517X
- Preceded by: The Little Hotel
- Followed by: I'm Dying Laughing: The Humourist

Miss Herbert (The Suburban Wife) (1976) is a novel by Australian writer Christina Stead.

== Story outline ==
The novel follows the life of Eleanor Herbert Brent, a recent university graduate, living in London and engaged to be married. Over the next few years she breaks her engagement, embarks on affair with a man she meets on a boat, leaves him, becomes engaged again, and then breaks off that engagement as well. She finally marries and has children but finds herself alone when her husband departs. She finds some success on the fringes of the literary world yet never really comes to know herself.

== Critical reception ==
Helen Yglesias in The New York Times found that this "is a supremely English novel, infused with the troubled, cocky and half‐defeated spirit of contemporary England. George Orwell might have written such a book, if women interested him, which they didn't, and if his style was not so flat out." And concludes "A wonderful book. The life story of a British beauty is a metaphor for England in its present hour."

Encyclopedia of the Novel notes that the novel "observes Miss Herbert's career in close details without offering judgment on the corruption and vapidity of her existence. The reader must deduce these from both the abundance of sordid detail and Miss Herbert's incomprehensible lack of historical awareness."

== See also ==
- 1976 in literature
