= Gustavus M. Blech =

American physician

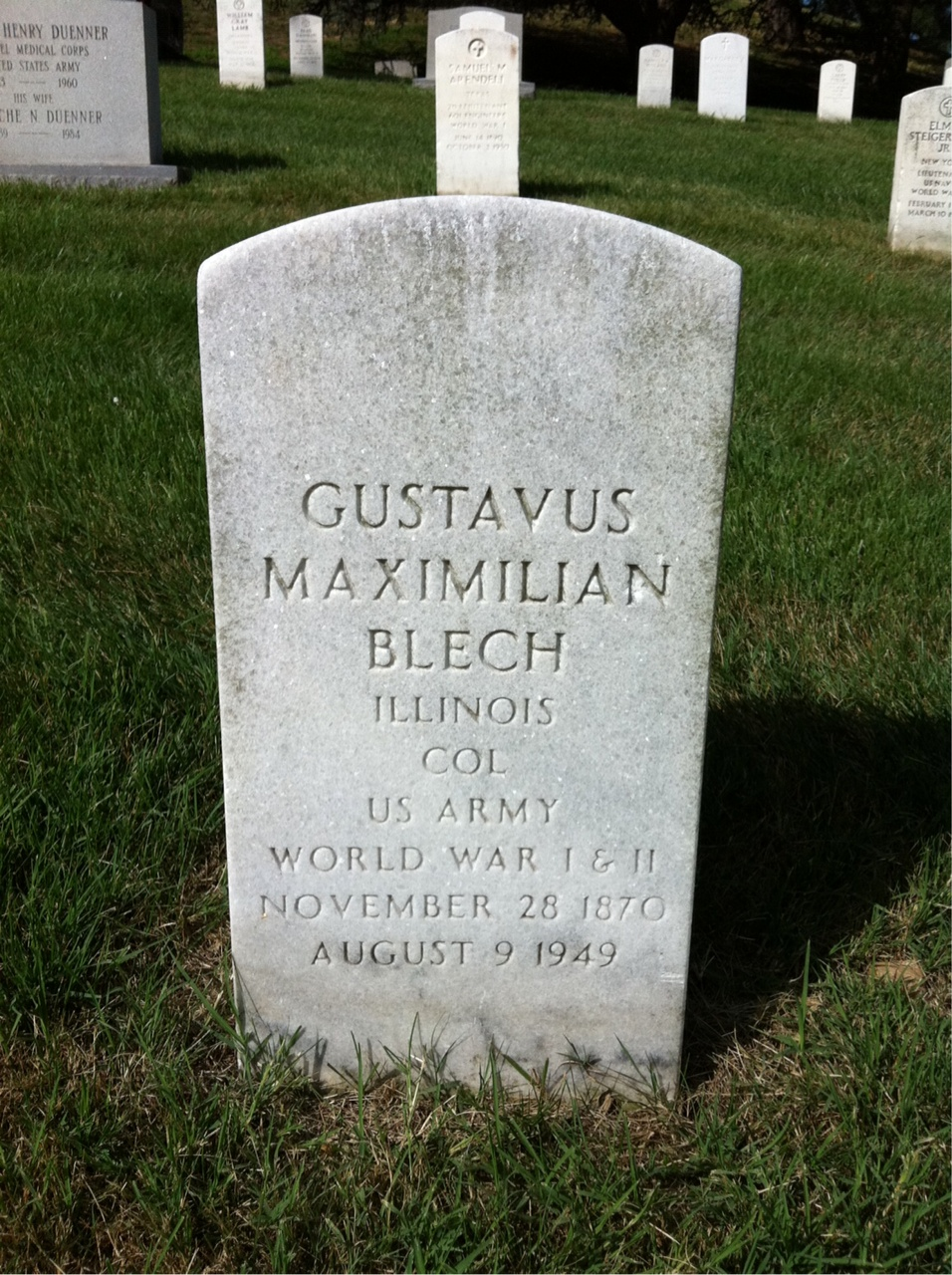
Grave at Arlington National Cemetery

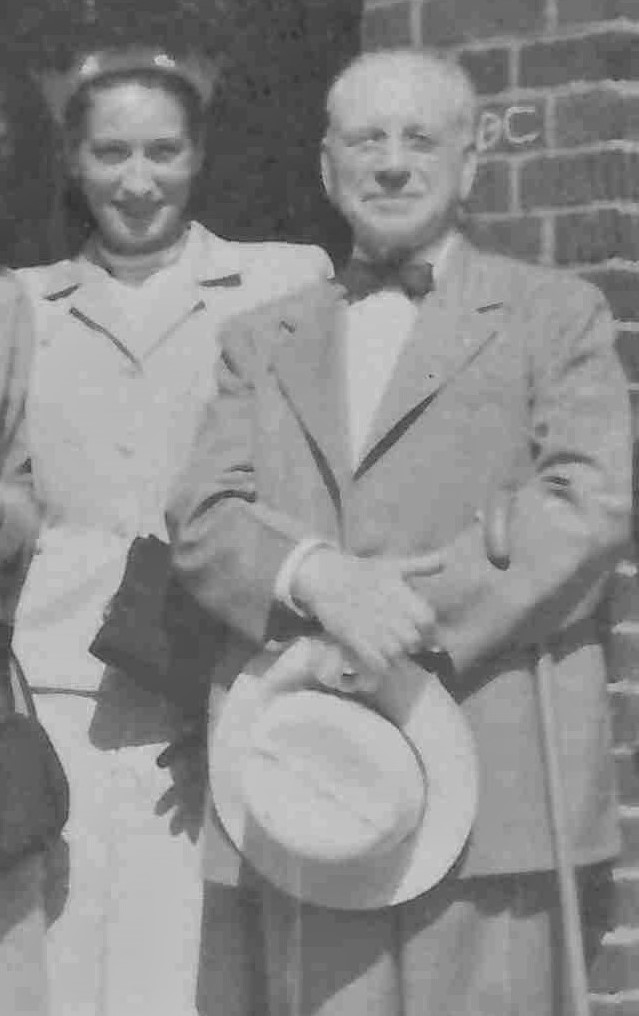
Gustavus M. Blech and his wife, Nelda.

Gustavus Maximilian Blech (November 28, 1870 in Riga (then Russia) – August 9, 1949 in Chicago, Illinois) was an American physician, surgeon, and medical educator. He was the son of Johann (Jwe, Israel) and Johanna (Haya-Sara Wulffahrt) Blech (Bljach). After immigrating to the United States in 1890, he earned his MD degree from Barnes Medical College of St. Louis, Missouri, in 1894.

He served as surgeon-in-chief, Lincoln Hospital, Chicago; professor of clinical surgery, Illinois Medical College, 1907–1912, and medical department, Loyola University Chicago, 1912–1914; consulting surgeon at Cook County Hospital and Wesley Memorial Hospital, Chicago; director-in-chief of the Illinois Legion, American Red Cross; and major, Illinois Infantry Medical Corps.

Blech was a veteran of the United States Army, achieving the rank of colonel, and the Illinois National Guard, achieving the rank of brigadier general, and served in the Spanish–American War, the Mexican border skirmishes, and World War I; in that latter war, he served as a colonel, Medical Reserve Corps, United States Army, and as an officier de l'instruction publique for France. He was assistant division surgeon of the 33rd Division and commanded Camp Hospital #47 at Autun, France, which was later designated as Base Hospital #208 and moved to Bordeaux. For his service in World War I, he was decorated by the governments of Imperial Russia, Belgium, and France.

Elsevier, a leading medical publisher, called him a "pioneer in the use of physical methods in surgery." He won the Gold Key Award from the American Congress of Rehabilitation Medicine in 1933, and was awarded the Order of St Michael and St George, Knight Grand Cross with Great Star and Grand Cordon, by the British government in 1937.

Blech was frequently published. He was editor of the Journal of Physical Therapy. He had research articles published in medical journals, including the American Journal of the Medical Sciences and Military Surgeon, where he wrote monthly medical book reviews from 1942 to 1949.

He was a life member of the Association of Military Surgeons of the U.S., and also was a member of the Association of Military Surgeons of Illinois, which he served as president.

Blech was married three times, to Rosa Sachs, Rose Berkenstadt, and Nelda Tschirley. He had one son and daughter from his first marriage, writer William J. Blake, husband of writer Christina Stead. William's first wife was Mollie Grossman. They had a daughter, Ruth Blech. Blech's daughter, Jenny, died at age 8 from tuberculosis.

At the time of his death, he was married to Nelda Tschirley Blech. They are buried in Arlington National Cemetery.

Blech had the following siblings: Leopold (Leib), Esekiil, Moisey, Henry (Chaim), Theodore (Tuvia), Waldemar, Beila-Riva and Lina Blech.

== Bibliography (primary author) ==
- The Practitioner's Guide to the Diagnosis and Treatment of Diseases of Women, the Clinic Publishing Co., Chicago, 1903;
- Clinical Electrosurgery, Oxford University Press, New York, (1938)
- A Handbook of First Aid in Accidents, Emergencies, Poisoning, and Sun Stroke
- Practical Suggestions in Borderland Surgery
- Memoirs of the World War, (1924)
- Self-instruction in Elementary Military Map Reading and Topographic Sketching, Standard Printing and Lithographic Co., Houston, TX, (1917)

== Bibliography (co-author) ==
- Medical Tactics and Logistics

Blech wrote chapters in the books The Therapeutical Applications of Peroxide of Hydrogen, Glycozone, Hydrozone, and Eye Balsam, Diseases of Children, and The Military Surgeon. He translated the book Hyperemia as a Therapeutic Agent by August Bier.
