= Dark Places of the Heart =

Book by Christina Stead

- First edition
- Author: Christina Stead
- Language: English
- Genre: Literary fiction
- Publisher: Holt, Rinehart and Winston
- Publication date: 1966
- Publication place: Australia
- Media type: Print
- Pages: 352pp
- Preceded by: The People with the Dogs
- Followed by: The Little Hotel

Dark Places of the Heart (1966) is a novel by Australian writer Christina Stead. This novel is also known by Stead's preferred title Cotter's England.

== Story outline ==
Set in post-war northern England the novel follows the fortunes of Nellie Cook, sister Peggy Cotter and brother Tom, and their familial and external relationships.

== Critical reception ==
Writing in The Canberra Times, Neville Braybrooke notes that the book is a "masterly depiction of working class life, both in the north and south of England, it has a freshness of vision which makes it unique."

A reviewer in Kirkus Review was a little ambivalent about the book: "Like her best novel, it is a hurdy gurdy of domestic crises, strewn with slashing, colorful speech, vigorous rhythms and social detail. Yet it has a strangely melancholic air and an uncertain jumble of incidents, as if the author were never sure either of her descriptive powers or of the intended emotional design."

== See also ==
- 1966 in literature
