= Seven Poor Men of Sydney =

Book by Christina Stead

- First edition
- Author: Christina Stead
- Language: English
- Genre: Literary fiction
- Publisher: Peter Davies, London
- Publication date: 1934
- Publication place: Australia
- Media type: Print
- Pages: 358pp
- Preceded by: –
- Followed by: The Beauties and Furies

Seven Poor Men of Sydney (1934) is the first novel by Australian writer Christina Stead.

== Story outline ==
The novel follows the fortunes of seven men living around Watson's Bay in Sydney. The men are brought together by their radical or rationalist beliefs or by their relationship and dealings to a printing press.

== Critical reception ==
A reviewer in The Courier-Mail likened the book to the work of an earlier novelist: "Twenty years ago Louis Stone, an Englishman, then living in New South Wales, showed in his novel, Jonah, that the streets of Sydney, throbbing with life, intensity, and emotionalism, provided a wonderful background for an Australian novel. Until the other day no other novelist had attempted to use such a crowded setting. Perhaps the scene was too big, the characterisation too difficult, the canalising of the emotions too intricate. Now it has been done by Miss Christina Stead in Seven Poor Men of Sydney (Peter Davles, London); and her book is remarkable, for its acute presentation of the lives and mentalities of a section, perhaps a limited section, of the poorer, people in Sydney."

Reviewing the book on its reissue in 1966 Maurice Dunlevy stated: "You can compare this book with no other Australian novel. So individualistic is it, in fact, that you can compare it with no other novel, although for purposes of explanation it can be said to resemble vaguely Virginia Woolf's The Waves which was published a few years before it. Christina Stead's characters, like Virginia Woolf's, express themselves in an extraordinary imaginative idiom. Though they are poor and 'uneducated' in the conventional sense, they are acutely sensitive, their lives revolve around their inward experiences, they are unusually articulate and often speak with the rhetoric of accomplished orators or with the imagery of poets."

== See also ==
- 1934 in Australian literature
- Jonah by Louis Stone

== Notes ==
At the time of the original publication of the novel Stead told The Australian Women's Weekly: "The Seven Poor Men are not actually drawn from life; they are like most characters, crystallisations of various types of men and women; they do not express in their conversations my view of life, but, I hope (or rather, intended) various views of life, according to their temperaments.

"Naturally, this is not always successful. Conversation is diffuse, disjointed, full of popular sayings and banalities local in time and place which do not express character at all, or very little. My purpose, in making characters somewhat eloquent, is the expression of two psychological truths; first, that everyone has a wit superior to his everyday wit, when discussing his personal problems, and the most depressed housewife, for example, can talk like Medea about her troubles; second, that everyone, to a greater or lesser extent, is a fountain of passion, which is turned by circumstances of birth or upbringing into conventional channels – as, ambition, love, money-grubbing, politics, but which could be as well applied to other objects and with less waste of energy."
