= I'm Dying Laughing: The Humourist =

First edition (Virago Press, 1986)

I'm Dying Laughing: The Humourist is a novel by Christina Stead (1902–1983). It was published posthumously by Virago Press in 1986, edited and with a preface by Ron Geering.

== Plot ==
The novel is essentially a tragedy and follows the lives of American novelist Emily Wilkes and her husband, a communist from a wealthy background, over several decades. The publisher describes it as "a magnificent achievement – an unsparing portrait of the disintegration of American Hollywood radicals, revealed with the passionate objectivity which was her hallmark."

Stead described her novel in an interview in 1973:

…all about the passion of – I use passion in almost the religious sense – of two people, two Americans, New Yorkers, in the thirties. They are doing well, but they suffered all the troubles of the thirties. They were politically minded. They went to Hollywood. They came to Europe to avoid the McCarthy trouble. Of course they were deeply involved. And they lived in Europe in, oh, in a wild and exciting and extravagant style. But there was nothing to support it. At the same time they wanted to be on the side of the angels, good Communists, good people, and also to be very rich. Well, of course…. they came to a bad end.

== An unfinished work ==
Stead worked on the book, off and on, with other novels intervening, for decades. In 1962, a chapter of the book titled "UNO 1945", then intended to be the first chapter, was published in the Australian literary journal Southerly. In 1966, she sent a complete version of the novel to her publisher, but was advised to revise it. Her New York agent wanted the disagreements between Emily, her husband and the communist party explained in more detail and Emily's past explained so that the reader could understand her; her British publisher wanted substantial revisions and a re-thinking of the first part of the novel. Perhaps the main reason for this reaction, besides the fact that the book was very long, was that the subject matter was not timely. As her Stead's friend Stanley Burnshaw wrote to her:

The whole Hollywood situation sounds incredible today, as does all the kowtowing to the party hacks through the forties and fifties. The CP and the radical movement are absolutely nil here; you wouldn't believe it. And your novel will come upon a reading public that regards the American experience with the CP and the radical left as nonsensical, idiotic, meaningless.

Explaining the events of the 1940s and 1950s and the social and political context of the novel within the text went against Stead's grain as a writer. The comments set off a long and never resolved process of revision and rewriting, which Stead came to regret.

The manuscript was assembled by Professor Ron Geering, Stead's literary executor, who explains in the preface: "What I inherited…was a huge mass of typescript ranging in finish from rough to polished and in length from page bits to different versions of whole chapters, along with piles of basic and supplementary material."

== Models for the characters ==
Stead advised young writers to "draw from life": to base their characters on real people and to "Live with them not only in your heart and mind but actually in life, as much as possible".

Stead stated many times that the characters of Emily and her husband were modeled on her friend, novelist Ruth McKenney and her husband Richard Bransten. Although appalled at the progress of the couples' lives, Stead had admired McKenny's personality and talent, and when she died wrote to friends:

What a wonderful personality she had, what a marvellous friend she was! I never met anyone like her, gay, clever, astute, pithy: as well as pithy she could be a torrent, an endless talker – a phenomenon

== Critical reception ==
I'm Dying Laughing, because of its intense theme and style, harks back to Stead's best-known work The Man Who Loved Children. Emily, the loquacious, uncontrollably energetic and self-destructive heroine, also resembles Sam Pollit in that novel. Some sections are agreed to be brilliant: in particular, the consecutive scenes "The Holinshed Party" and "The Straightening Out". In these scenes, the Howards, keen to break into the inner circle of Hollywood communists, are invited to a dinner party, and find themselves on trial for their sins against the party line and also, that their "friends" are considering giving evidence against them in a custody case.

The main problems for reviewers are the novel's length, loose structure and degree of detail. These were the problems that reviewers had with Stead's other novels, but apparently the problems are deeper in "I'm Dying Laughing". Some thought Geering should have edited it more freely:

The overall shape of the book wanders, lumps, builds too unevenly and explodes too early. Major characters are introduced only to fade away or disappear entirely.

One reviewer thinks the problem is that Stead attempted unsuccessfully to make characters personify concepts

alas, Stead was more adept at conceptualising people than personifying concepts and this didactic novel seems queerly cadaverous after the almost ungovernable autonomy of life that veins the leaves of The Man Who Loved Children

Vivian Gornick comments that, like The Man Who Loved Children, the novel

is dominated by this extraordinary syntax that burrows into the situation, tries to get a fix on things, becomes the story itself. But this novel journeys on and on and yet somehow refuses to arrive

Reviewers differ mainly in the balance of irritation and admiration. Gornick comments

the fire is banked but it does burn, the pages flicker and flame...

Diane Cole says:

By turns fascinating and irritating, the novel is one of those loose and baggy monsters that can try one's patience even as it impresses itself in memory

While Ann Karnovsky summarises:

…We are fortunate that [Geering] was able to pick up the pieces…setting the mosaic in all its splendid, uneven glory.

== Audiobook ==
In 2006, Barnes and Noble issued an audiobook of I'm Dying Laughing, read by Anna Fields.
