= A Little Tea, a Little Chat =

Book by Christina Stead

- First edition
- Author: Christina Stead
- Language: English
- Genre: Literary fiction
- Publisher: Harcourt Brace
- Publication date: 1948
- Publication place: Australia
- Media type: Print
- Pages: 394pp
- Preceded by: Letty Fox: Her Luck
- Followed by: The People with the Dogs

A Little Tea, a Little Chat (1948) is a novel by Australian writer Christina Stead.

== Story outline ==
Middle-aged Robert Grant lives in New York in 1941. He lives by his own rules and is always on the lookout for a new female conquest, whom he attempts to seduce with "a little tea, a little chat". His life continues in this manner until he meets Barbara, a thirty-two-year-old good-looking woman who is very much his match.

== Critical reception ==
A reviewer in Kirkus Review found little of interest in the book: "Only the most fanatical followers of this author will be able to label it good to the last drop, other less biased will discover as vicious a portraiture of contemporary types as can be imagined."

Paul Shellinger in Encyclopedia of the Novel was much more enthusiastic: "At the center of Stead's interest in experiment and change lies her interest in history. Her papers indicate that she researched the background for each novel assiduously. Her characters move through a corrupt 20th-century world – specifically the world of the 1930s and 1940s. It is a world in which the possibility of reform or revolution has been destroyed, leaving idealists to act out an often unself-conscious hypocrisy. Stead's interest in "man alive" leads her to stunningly original subject matter; her account of the black market in New York during World War II in A Little Tea, a Little Chat (1948), for example, has no historical parallel."

In an essay discussing Stead's "egotistical monsters", Maria Sloggett concludes "...the characterisation of Grant is a result of Stead's polyphonic project: she allows his voice to express itself freely and without any censorship. The author is in no way close to the character in the sense that they might be mistaken for each other. It has also been demonstrated that Grant's domination is intended to be indicative of his monologic disposition. This conscious device on the part of the author dismisses any suggestion that the difficulties of the text: its repetitiveness, tediousness and odiousness, are representative of the author's style. While one voice may dominate, it is not the author's, a fact which underscores the author's distance and the goal of objectivity in the portrayal of Grant."

== See also ==
- 1948 in Australian literature
