= Adam Forster =

Australian illustrator and naturalist (1848–1928)

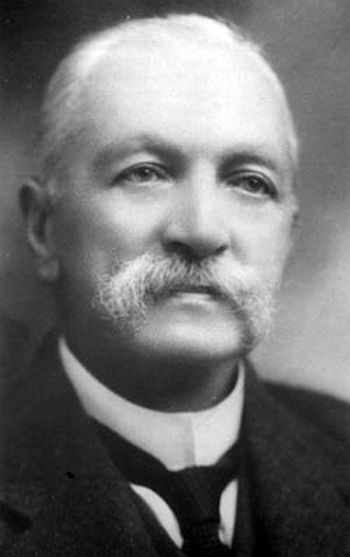

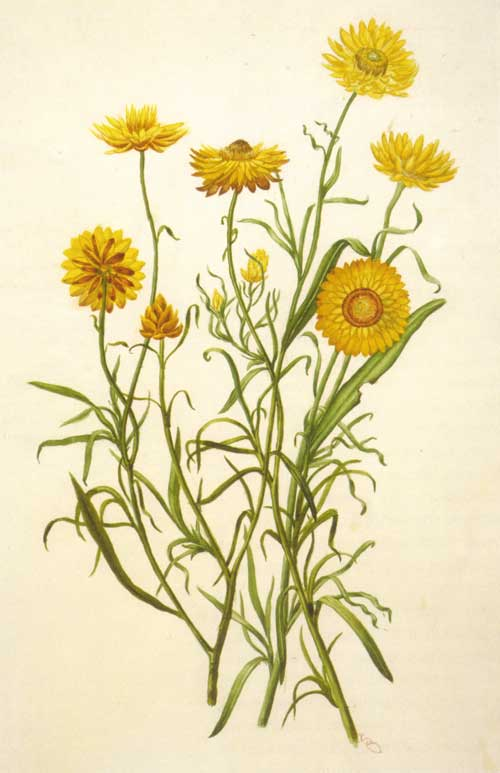
Xerochrysum bracteatum (Vent.) Tzvelev

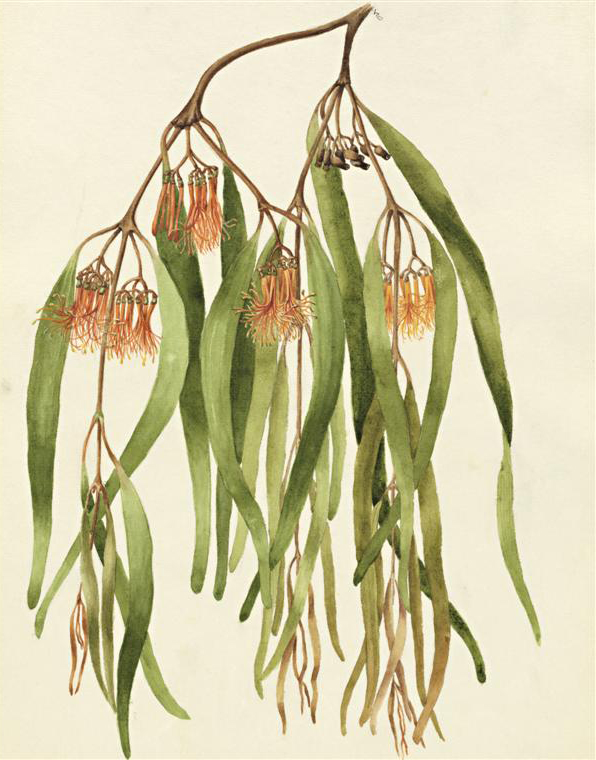
Muellerina eucalyptoides (DC.) Barlow

Adam Forster a.k.a. Carl August von Wiarda (5 April 1848 Emden, East Frisia - 11 April 1928 Sydney), was a botanical illustrator and naturalist, who after a lengthy stay in South Africa, eventually emigrated to Australia.

He was born the 5th son of Dorothee Caroline Metger and Christian Heinrich Wiarda, who was at that time President of the Supreme High Court of Aurich in Lower Saxony. After being sent to Military School, Carl took up the study of medicine at Hamburg University. After two years of study he was drafted to serve in the Franco-Prussian War, became an officer in the Prussian Guard, and was awarded the Iron Cross, First Class. Disillusioned by the slaughter and destruction, and by the plight of the refugees, he gave up his commission and emigrated to South Africa, where in 1874 he married Mary Emma Smith (born 10 November 1855 in Port Elizabeth), daughter of William Smith, the former and first mayor of Port Elizabeth. His talent for sketching was evident in the many drawings he executed while in Port Elizabeth - besides a delicate pencil sketch of his bride, he produced images of a number of Cape wildflowers.

In about 1890, after some failed business ventures, but also influenced by the unsettled political situation in the Cape, he left Mary and their 3 children in Port Elizabeth while he sailed for Australia to see whether it offered a more promising future. Leaving aboard the 'Cutty Sark', he changed his name to 'Adam Forster', which he felt was a more acceptable identity in an English colony, and in all likelihood after Johann Georg Adam Forster, the painter and illustrator who had accompanied Captain James Cook on his second expedition to the Pacific. He became Registrar of the Pharmaceutical Board in 1897, holding that office for 23 years until his retirement.

Forster's father was an accomplished portrait painter, and Forster had inherited the same artistic talent. His growing interest in the flora of Australia led to his setting himself the goal of illustrating a thousand Australian plants. To accomplish this he explored the Sydney region over weekends to collect and sketch plant specimens. George Robertson of the publishers 'Angus & Robertson' then commissioned Forster to provide scaled-down versions of his larger illustrations for a book on Australian plants, with text to be written by Edwin Cheel, state botanist of New South Wales. Forster succumbed to a heart attack after completing 248 images for the book. The project was at first abandoned, but was revived 10 years later by George Ferguson, Robertson's grandson, and eventually published in 1939 as "Wild Flowers of Australia" with text by Thistle Yolette Harris.

In April 2011 the National Library of Australia published a selection of 90 of the 900 Forster paintings they hold in "A Brilliant Touch: Adam Forster's Wildflower Paintings".

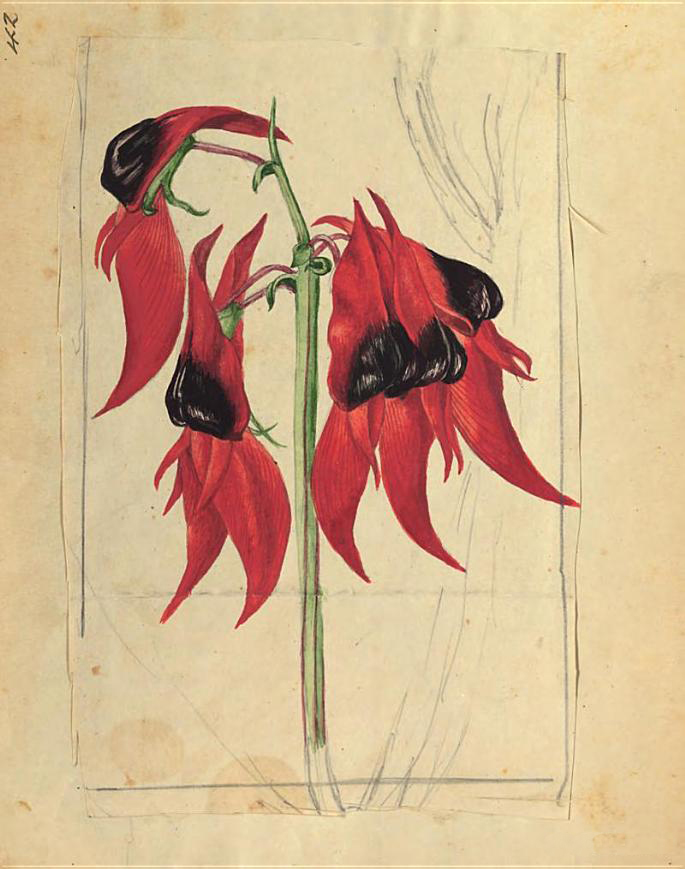
Swainsona formosa

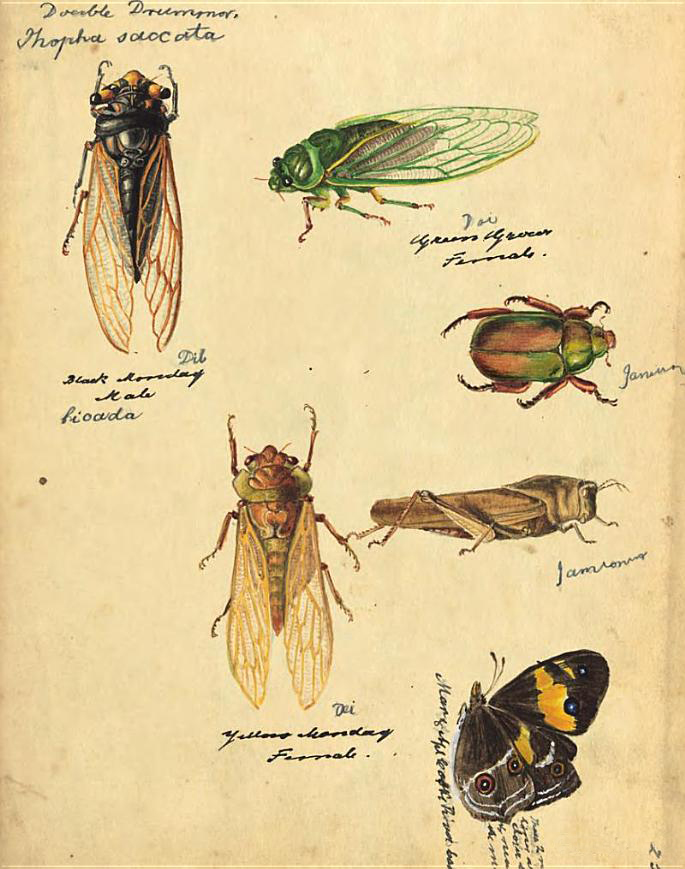
Various insects

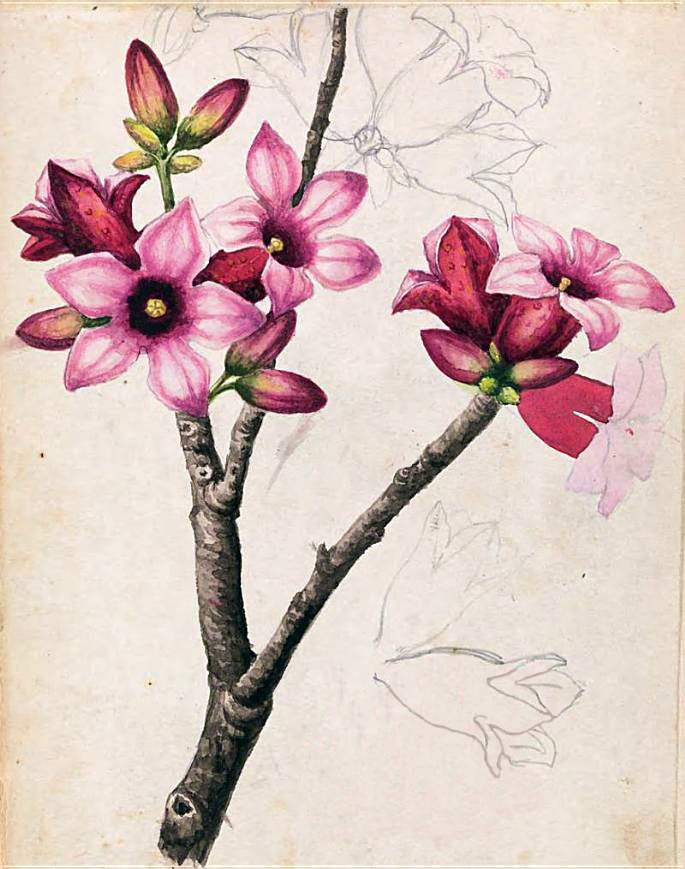
Brachychiton discolor
