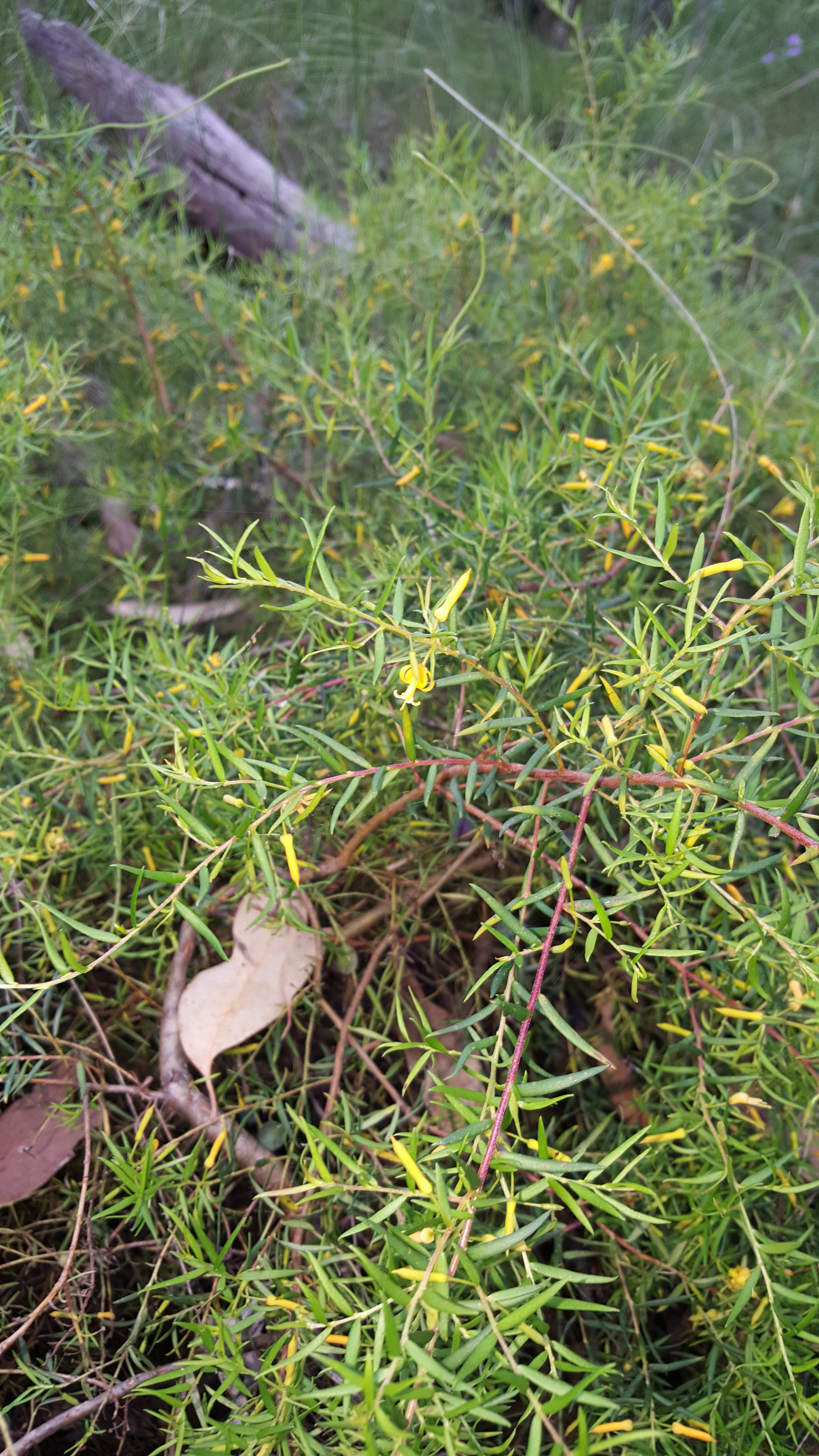

Conservation status
- Vulnerable (EPBC Act)

Scientific classification
- Kingdom: Plantae
- Clade: Tracheophytes
- Clade: Angiosperms
- Clade: Eudicots
- Order: Proteales
- Family: Proteaceae
- Genus: Persoonia
- Species: P. bargoensis

Binomial name
- Persoonia bargoensis L.A.S.Johnson & P.H.Weston
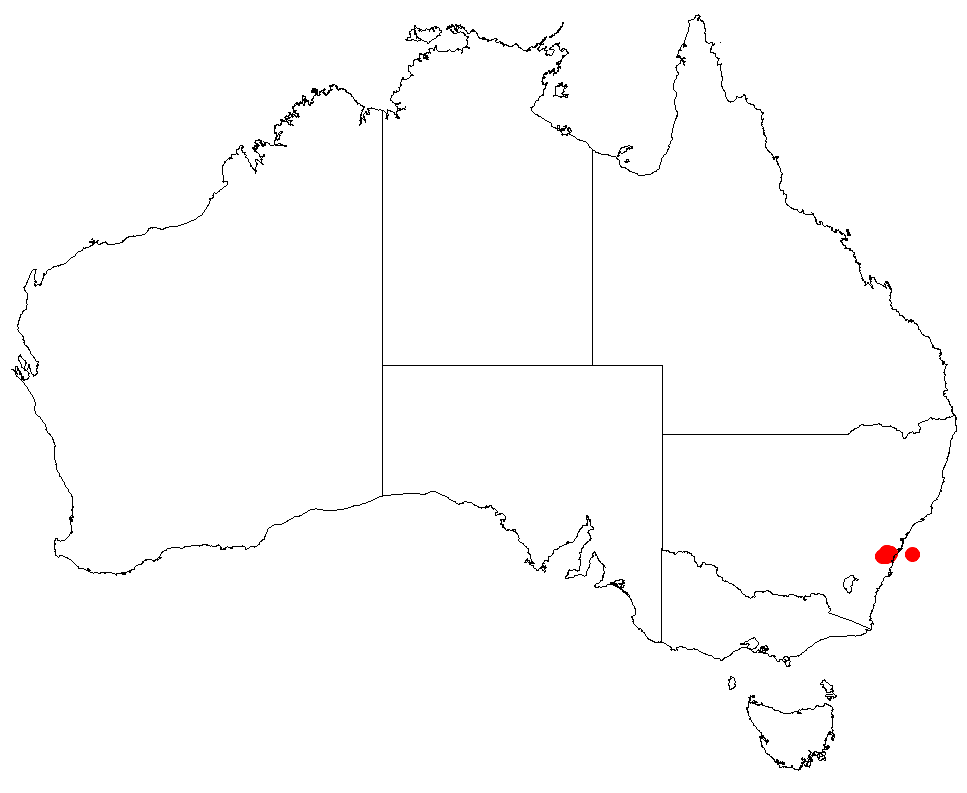
- Occurrence data from Australasian Virtual Herbarium

= Persoonia bargoensis =

Bargo geebung

Species of flowering plant

Persoonia bargoensis, commonly known as the Bargo geebung, is a species of flowering plant in the family Proteaceae and is endemic to a restricted area of New South Wales. It is an erect shrub with linear to lance-shaped leaves, yellow, tube-shaped flowers and green, pear-shaped fruit.

== Description ==
Persoonia bargoensis is an erect, bushy shrub that typically grows to a height of 0.6–2.5 m (2 ft 0 in – 8 ft 2 in) with a light covering of brownish hairs on its young branches. The leaves are arranged alternately along the stems, linear to lance-shaped, 8–24 mm (0.31–0.94 in) long, 1–2.3 mm (0.039–0.091 in) wide and paler on the lower surface. The flowers are arranged in groups of up to twenty in leaf axils or on the ends of branchlets that continue to grow after flowering. Each tube-shaped flower is borne on a pedicel 3–7 mm (0.12–0.28 in) long and has yellow tepals 7–10 mm (0.28–0.39 in) long. Flowering occurs from December to January and the fruit is a pear-shaped drupe up to 12 mm (0.47 in) long.

== Taxonomy ==
Persoonia bargoensis was first formally described in 1991 by Peter Weston and Lawrie Johnson of the National Herbarium of New South Wales from material collected near Douglas Park in 1989. They had previously considered it an intermediate form between Persoonia nutans, that is found 40 km (25 mi) to the north, and P. oxycoccoides, found 25 km (16 mi) to the south. However, further study found no evidence of intermediate forms between it and the other two species. Within the genus, P. bargoensis is classified in the Lanceolata group, a group of 58 closely related species with similar flowers but very different foliage. These species will often interbreed with each other where two members of the group occur.

== Distribution and habitat ==
Bargo geebung is found in small scattered patches in an area bordered by Picton and Douglas Park to the north, Yanderra to the south, Cataract River to the east and Thirlmere to the west where it grows on Sydney sandstone and Wianamatta shale soils, 100–300 m (330–980 ft) above sea level. It grows in dry sclerophyll eucalypt forest, under forest red gum (Eucalyptus tereticornis) and broad-leaved red ironbark (E. fibrosa) with a grassy understory of kangaroo grass (Themeda triandra), or more open woodland with such trees as red bloodwood (Corymbia gummifera), scribbly gum (Eucalyptus sclerophylla), grey gum (E. punctata), narrow-leaved stringybark (E. sparsifolia) and small-leaved apple (Angophora bakeri) with a shrubby understory of plants such as wreath bush-pea (Pultenaea tuberculata). The increased light and lack of competing plants means the species adapts preferably to growing on road verges.

== Conservation status ==
This geebung is classified as "vulnerable" under the Australian Government Environment Protection and Biodiversity Conservation Act 1999 and as "endangered" under the New South Wales Government Biodiversity Conservation Act 2016. The main threats to the species include its small population size, habitat loss and fragmentation and inappropriate maintenance activities.
