= The Little Hotel =

Book by Christina Stead

- First edition
- Author: Christina Stead
- Language: English
- Genre: Literary fiction
- Publisher: Angus and Robertson
- Publication date: 1973
- Publication place: Australia
- Media type: Print
- Pages: 191pp
- ISBN: 0207955301
- Preceded by: Dark Places of the Heart
- Followed by: Miss Herbert (The Suburban Wife)

The Little Hotel (1973) is a novel by Australian writer Christina Stead.

== Story outline ==
In a small European hotel in the late 1940s a bizarre group of characters, who all seem to be on the run from some past financial, personal or political horror, come together.

== Critical reception ==
In a short survey of books for the 1974 Christmas market, Margaret Sydney noted in The Australian Women's Weekly that "This novel is one to treasure, because of its humor, its beautiful writing, its understanding of the way in which bothered people tick."

Kegan Gardiner has written an extended review essay on the novel and finds: "Despite some gaps in its narrative point of view, The Little Hotel is a shapely piece of fiction, with coherent parallel plotting, a careful array of interconnected characters, and rich patterns of imagery." And continues "Unusually for Stead, in The Little Hotel we hear less of her characters’ speeches than we might like. The characters and their pasts are gradually revealed, with much left open to our imaginations. This is a subtle novel, a term rarely applied to Stead."

== See also ==
- 1973 in literature

== Notes ==
Part of novel was previously published as a short story entitled "The Woman in the Bed" in Meanjin Quarterly, Summer 1968.

Maurice Dunlevy notes, in The Canberra Times in 1987, that he heard Stead state in a 1969 lecture that she never wrote to the direction of a publisher. He then goes on "I do know that her claim about never writing for a special audience was a lie. The woman who never wrote at the dictates of a publisher actually wrote The Little Hotel for a very special audience of one, or so she said. She told Elizabeth Riddell in 1973 that she had written it as an affectionate tribute to her Seeker and Warburg editor, Oliver Stallybrass. It was for his eyes only, not to be published, but he had insisted it should be."
