= The Beauties and Furies =

Book by Christina Stead

- First US edition
- Author: Christina Stead
- Language: English
- Genre: Literary fiction
- Publisher: Peter Davies, London (UK); D. Appleton Century (US)
- Publication date: 1936
- Publication place: Australia
- Media type: Print
- Pages: 383pp
- Preceded by: Seven Poor Men of Sydney
- Followed by: House of All Nations

The Beauties and Furies (1936) is a novel by Australian writer Christina Stead.

== Story outline ==
In 1934 Elvira Western is married to the solid, but boring, Paul. She runs away to Paris to meet her lover, Oliver, a student and the antithesis of her husband. The novel follows the story of the self-obsessed lovers, and the sexual tensions and betrayals that ensue.

== Critical reception ==
A reviewer in The Sydney Morning Herald was a little disappointed with the novel: "In her latest book the author shows a definite tendency to develop an artificial style, a tendency which made Its appearance in her second book. That "visionary imagination," for which she has been commended, runs away with reality altogether in The Beauties and Furies at times...Also the book is too long; interest In the protagonists is well maintained for two-thirds of the distance, after that it flags. We will look forward with Interest to Miss Stead's next publication. "

Similarly, a reviewer in The Mail (Adelaide) did not recommend the book at all: "Impressed by the promise (contained in the advance publicity sheets) that the reader would find in Miss Christina Stead's novel, The Beauties and Furies,' much visionary imagination, one approached the task of reviewing this book with a good deal of pleasure. But, alas for human hopes! The only brand of imagination that will be stimulated by the book is that which is better left uncultivated."

Reviewing the novel on its re-release in the early 1980s under the Virago Modern Classics banner, Hope Hewitt was more forgiving while still seeing the novel's shortcomings: "The Stead qualities are there; the understanding of the female predicament, the verbal response to sensual beauty, the ear for intellectual or pseudo-intellectual dialogue, the ability to observe and re-create the contrasts of cosmopolitan living. But I was not surprised that the book went out of print. The author was to move far ahead of this. As a study of female sexuality it is remarkably old-fashioned for 1936, as readers of other English Viragos, much earlier in the century, will know."

== See also ==
- 1936 in Australian literature
