= For Love Alone (novel) =

Book by Christina Stead

- First edition
- Author: Christina Stead
- Language: English
- Genre: Literary fiction
- Publisher: Harcourt Brace
- Publication date: 1944
- Publication place: Australia
- Media type: Print
- Pages: 491pp
- Preceded by: The Man Who Loved Children
- Followed by: Letty Fox: Her Luck

For Love Alone (1944) is a novel by Australian writer Christina Stead.

== Story outline ==
Set in Sydney and London in the 1930s, the novel tells the story of Teresa Hawkins and her search for the ideal of love. She follows the unworthy Jonathan Crow to London and discovers Crow's corruption and egoistic shallowness. Taken under the wing of an older man, James Quick, she discovers a renewed sense of love and compassion.

== Critical reception ==
A reviewer in The Advertiser (Adelaide) was not impressed with the novel at all: "This is a sadly disappointing fact, for Christina Stead for long has been outstanding among Australian writers, and her novels have been unusually brilliant books. In this novel, though, she has attempted a realistic subject and approach, and both subject and approach are quite unsuited to her talents. Her supposed realism, in contrast to her previous fantasy, is unselective and generally without significance. It makes the characters ridiculous figures whose actions appear meaningless and purposeless."

In reviewing the novel when it was re-issued in 1970, W.S. Ramson compared it to Martin Boyd's novel Lucinda Brayford, also re-issued at that time: "For Love Alone is as different in style as it is possible to be, feminine, intuitive, almost claustrophobic in its intensity and introspectiveness, masterful rather than masterly in its assurance. Miss Stead worries at her subject examining and analysing, leeching her material dry, probing through a world which bends before the weight of her examination, and becomes strained and distorted into a new and tightly controlled perspective."

== Film Adaptation ==
The novel was adapted into a film of the same name in 1986. The adaptation was written and directed by Stephen Wallace, and featured Helen Buday, Sam Neill, and Hugo Weaving.

== See also ==
- 1944 in Australian literature
