= Letty Fox: Her Luck =

1946 novel by Christina Stead

- First edition
- Author: Christina Stead
- Language: English
- Publisher: Harcourt, Brace
- Publication date: 1946
- Publication place: United States
- Media type: Print (Paperback)
- Pages: 517 pp
- ISBN: 0-940322-70-6
- OCLC: 45243179
- Dewey Decimal: 823/.912 21
- LC Class: PR9619.3.S75 L48 2001
- Preceded by: For Love Alone
- Followed by: A Little Tea, a Little Chat

Letty Fox: Her Luck is Australian-born author Christina Stead’s sixth novel. It is a tribute to the drama of the urban environment and its role in socializing its occupants. Published in 1946, Stead wrote the lengthy Letty Fox after living in New York City for seven years.

== Synopsis ==
In a break from her typical style of story-telling, Christina Stead wrote Letty Fox from the first person perspective. The novel's protagonist narrator, Letty Fox, reveals herself as a bundle of contradictions. While Letty is a shrewd observer of human behavior, her perceptions and reactions are in various instances romantic, conservative, and feminist. Stead introduces the reader to Letty at the restless age of 24 with the following mise en scène:

One hot night last spring, after waiting fruitlessly for a call from my then lover, with whom I had quarreled the same afternoon, and finding one of my black moods on me, I flung out of my lonely room on the ninth floor (unlucky number) in a hotel in lower Fifth Avenue and rushed into the streets of the Village, feeling bad. My first thought was, at any cost, to get company for the evening.

This beginning hints at Letty's capacity to be sexually frank, along with her steadfast desire to act with commonsense.

While major political events, such as the economic depression and World War II, provide setting for Letty Fox: Her Luck, the reader finds that the story devotes itself to the psychological development of its main character. In what Rudolf Bader has referred to as a “one long bildungsroman,” Stead wrote Letty Fox as a colossally comic coming-of-age, wherein readers are introduced to the colorful personalities that shaped the heroine's young life. Letty gains wisdom through lessons bestowed by her unusual family and her numerous unsuccessful relationships with unsuitable men, including her passionate mania for Luke Adams (“a tease, a hound of love”). Stead ends the novel when Letty rejects a life of scattered sexual aggression, in favor of the stability of marriage.

== Critical reception ==
The cosmopolitan setting serves well as the theater in which Stead develops her characters through their adventures with numerous careers, love affairs, familial obligations, and sensitivities to reputation. To this end, Letty Fox has been described as “a modern picaresque novel and psychological novel at the same time.”

Letty's decision to marry her friend, Bill van Week, has been interpreted by literary critics as an acceptance of the sexual economics that dominate middle-class male/female relationships at the time. However, that is not to suggest that Stead's reputation as a writer lacks a feminist perspective. On the contrary, through the character of Letty, Stead portrays a complex woman struggling inside of the patriarchal structures that confine her to a particular world. Letty's choice to marry and have a child - because she is “tired of steering” in a sea of men - may be viewed as Stead's criticism of a society that strictly limits female experience. Like many of Stead's female characters, the fictionalized women of Letty Fox: Her Luck are conscious of the ways in which the male capitalist culture dominates them. At least one critic has judged Letty as “a heartless betrayer,” who borrows from and champions the suppressive ideology of power, exploiting others to achieve her goals. Or, maybe Letty just gets lucky.

== Publication history ==
After the novel's initial publication by Harcourt, Brace in 1946 it was reprinted as follows:

- Peter Davies, UK, 1947
- Angus and Robertson, Australia, 1974, 1984 and 1991
- Virago, UK, 1978
- Harcourt, Brace 1979
- New York Review of Books, USA, 2001
- Miegunyah Press, Australia, 2011
- Head of Zeus, UK, 2017

The novel was also translated into French in 1948, Italian in 1953 and 2004.
