= Judy Messer =

Australian conservationist (1933–2023)

Judy Messer (1933–2023) was an Australian conservationist.

== Biography ==
Judy Messer was born in 1933 in Armadale, Western Australia. Her early life was marked by a close connection to nature due to her upbringing in a rural setting. She pursued nursing as a career and, in the 1970s, obtained a PhD in sociology from the University of New South Wales (UNSW).

In 1957, she married Michael Messer, a biochemistry professor known for his research on marsupial milk. By 1970, she was involved in the establishment of the Lane Cove Bushland and Conservation Society in Greenwich.

From 1984 to 2000, Messer led the Nature Conservation Council (NCC), during which the council addressed various environmental issues in Australia. She served as a non-executive director of Sydney Water from 1988 to 2002.

Messer participated in several global conservation events, including the World Conservation Assemblies and the World Congress on National Parks. In 1993, she was awarded a Churchill Fellowship in the U.S. to study conservation funding mechanisms.

In 2000, Messer received the Serventy Conservation Medal from the Australian Wildlife Society.

In 2003, Messer became a member of the Order of Australia. Her papers are held in the National Library of Australia.
