= House of All Nations =

Book by Christina Stead

- First US edition
- Author: Christina Stead
- Language: English
- Genre: Literary fiction
- Publisher: Peter Davies, London (UK); Simon & Schuster (US)
- Publication date: 1938
- Publication place: Australia
- Media type: Print
- Pages: 795pp
- Preceded by: The Beauties and Furies
- Followed by: The Man Who Loved Children

House of All Nations (1938) is a novel by Australian writer Christina Stead.

== Story outline ==
The novel portrays the inner workings of the financial world of a bank in Paris in the early 1930s. The bank is populated by a cast of shady characters who are manipulative, unsavory schemers. The owner of the Bertillon Brothers bank, Jules Bertillon, exemplifies all that is bad about the bank and will stop at nothing to achieve his sole aim of making as much money as he can.

== Critical reception ==
A reviewer in The Mail (Adelaide) was greatly impressed with the novel finding that "Miss Stead's interest lies with the people, queer, mercurial, people with the superstitions and instincts of savages, and the clothes and manners of the beau monde. As in all great works, her vision penetrates beyond the immediate significance of what she sees and describes to the broader implications. It is this, perhaps, that gives the book its morbid fascination, for Miss Stead is merely studying people in an advanced stage of the disease which affects all of us more or less in our desire to make money as rapidly and as easily as possible."

But a reviewer in The Sydney Morning Herald was much more critical: "House of All Nations, Christina Stead's new novel, may be a brilliant exposition of the modern international financial system, but it is not a good novel. The author already has exhibited a predilection of style described by one critic as "rich and strange." In the present case, her richness will probably give the average reader an acute attack of mental indigestion; the strangeness may perhaps make it a thing of beauty to that exclusive circle which professes to enjoy and be impressed by obscurity. In both matter and manner, this book must inevitably present grave difficulties to most readers. The world of international finance is, to most of us, a remote one. No one will dispute the fact that it easily might be made the stage for swift and moving drama. To the attainment of this end, however, Miss Stead's approach is not suitable, She is absorbed by thoughts and individuáis, and lacks the power to co-ordinate them towards a telling and comprehensible climax. She allows herself, to be preoccupied and side-tracked by an infinite variety of queer characters and incidents. Intensely interesting in themselves, no doubt, but distracting to the reader who seeks, in vain, a stable thread which might lead him out of the maze."

== See also ==
- 1938 in Australian literature
