= David George Stead =

Australian marine biologist, oceanographer, conservationist & writer (1877–1957)

- David George Stead, circa 1900s
- Born: 6 March 1877; St Leonards, Sydney, NSW, Australia
- Died: 2 August 1957 (aged 80); Watsons Bay, Sydney, Australia
- Education: Sydney Technical College
- Occupations: Marine biologist Oceanographer
- Known for: Wildlife Preservation Society of Australia
- Children: 6
- Relatives: Christina Stead (daughter)

David George Stead (6 March 1877 – 2 August 1957) was an Australian marine biologist, ichthyologist, oceanographer, conservationist and writer. He was born at St Leonards in Sydney, and educated at public schools and the Sydney Technical College. In 1909 he was a founder of, and during its early years the main driving force behind, the Wildlife Preservation Society of Australia. In December 1912 he became an inaugural committee member of the Eugenics Society of New South Wales. His career included many government positions both in Australia and in Malaya. He served as the Australian representative on international committees concerned with fisheries science, marine biology and oceanography. He was a managing director of the Australian Whaling Company. He married three times, the third time to botanist and writer Thistle Yolette Harris in 1951. He died at his home in Watsons Bay, Sydney.

Stead is commemorated in the David G. Stead Memorial Wild Life Research Foundation of Australia, and the Wirrimbirra Sanctuary at Bargo, established by his third wife in his memory in the early 1960s. Mount Stead in the Blue Mountains is named after him. He was survived by two daughters and three sons of his second marriage and by the only child of his first marriage, the novelist Christina Stead.

Sam in The Man Who Loved Children by Christina Stead is partly modelled on her father.

== Publications ==
As well as numerous papers and articles, books authored by Stead include:

- 1905 – Crustaceans: Ancient, Modern and Mythical. With notes on edible crustaceans of NSW. William Brooks: Sydney.
- 1906 – Fishes of Australia. A Popular and Systematic Guide to the Study of the Wealth within our Waters. William Brooks: Sydney.
- 1907 – Eggs and Breeding Habits of Fishes with Special Reference to Australian Species. William Brooks: Sydney.
- 1908 – The Edible Fishes of New South Wales. Their Present Importance and Their Potentialities. NSW Government: Sydney.
- 1923 – General report upon the fisheries of British Malaya with recommendations for future development. A.J. Kent, Govt. Printer.
- 1933 – Giants and Pigmies of the Deep: a Story of Australian Sea Denizens. Shakespeare Head Press: Sydney.
- 1943 – The Tree Book. Consolidated Press: Sydney.
- 1935 – The Rabbit in Australia. Sydney.
- 1963 – Sharks and Rays of Australian Seas. Angus & Robertson: Sydney.

== See also ==
- Category:Taxa named by David George Stead
- Crocodile farming in Singapore
