= William J. Blake =

American writer and economist (1894–1968)

William James Blake (1894–1968) was an American broker, novelist and Marxist political economist. He was born Wilhelm James Blech in St Louis, Missouri to Rosa Sachs and surgeon and medical educator Gustavus M. Blech, M.D. His first marriage ended in divorce. In 1952 he married Australian novelist Christina Stead after the two had lived together for 28 years in various cities around the world.

Blake's writings included the 1941 novel, The Copperheads, a character-heavy study of intrigues in New York City during the American Civil War, and An American Looks at Karl Marx, an introduction to and criticism of Marxism.

In February 1968 Blake died of stomach cancer in London. Before his death he and Stead had planned a move to Australia. In 2005 a collection of the correspondence between Blake and Stead was published. Dearest Munx contains letters from 1928 to Blake's death in 1968.
