= Christina Stead =

Australian writer

- Christina Stead in 1938
- Born: Christina Ellen Stead; 17 July 1902; Rockdale, New South Wales, Australia
- Died: 31 March 1983 (aged 80); Sydney, New South Wales, Australia
- Spouse: William J. Blake (m. 1952; died 1968)
- Writing career
- Language: English
- Years active: 1921–1983
- Notable work: The Man Who Loved Children
- Notable awards: Patrick White Award

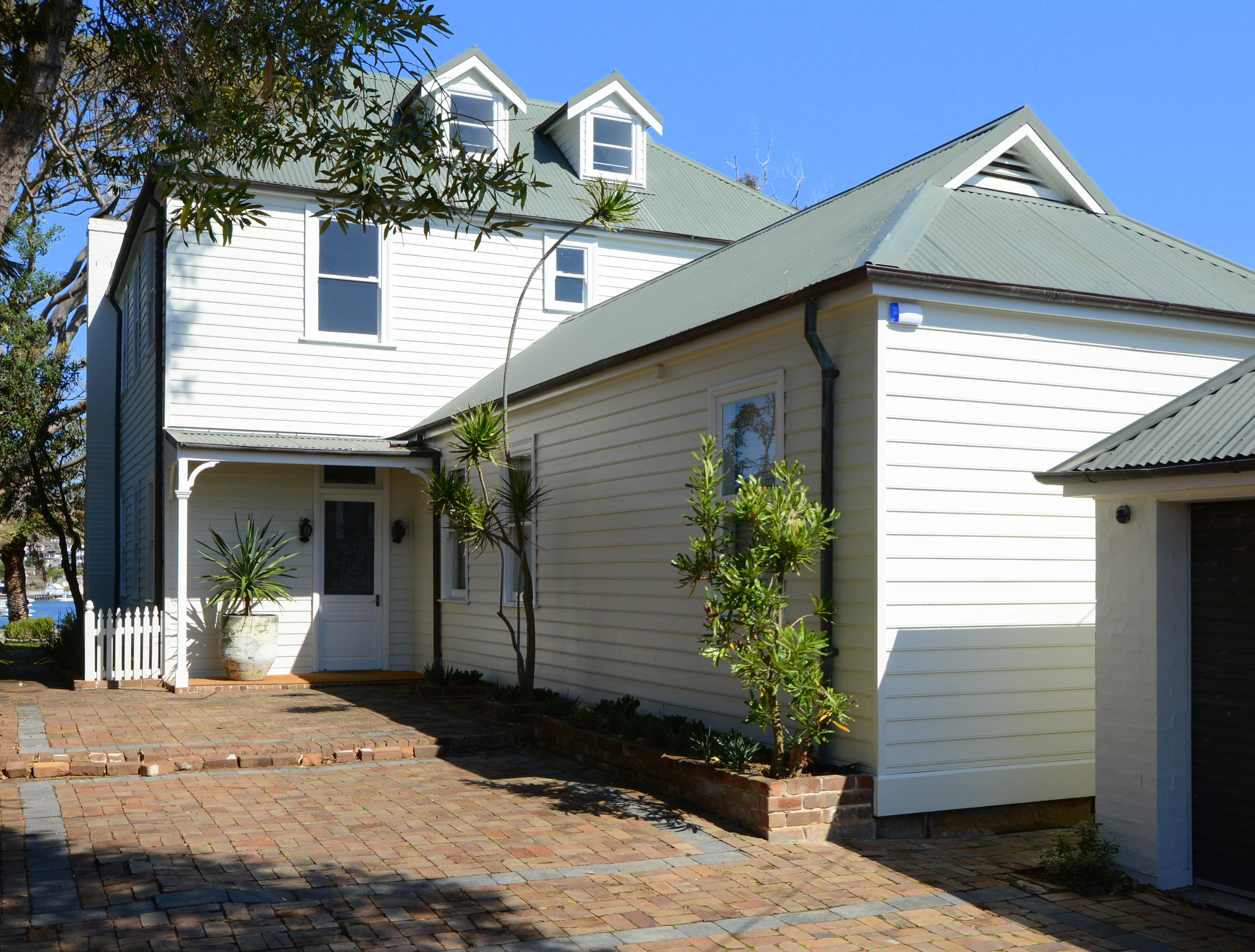
House in Pacific Street, Watsons Bay, Sydney, where Stead lived 1917-1928

Christina Stead (17 July 1902 – 31 March 1983) was an Australian novelist and short-story writer acclaimed for her satirical wit and penetrating psychological characterisations. Christina Stead was a committed Marxist, although she was never a member of the Communist Party. She spent much of her life outside Australia, although she returned before her death.

== Biography ==
Christina Stead's father was the marine biologist and pioneer conservationist David George Stead; her mother was his first wife Ellen Butters, who died in 1904. She was born in the Sydney suburb of Rockdale. They lived in Rockdale at Lydham Hall, now operating as a museum.

Stead later moved with her family to the suburb of Watsons Bay in 1917. She was the only child of her father's first marriage, and had five half-siblings from his second marriage. He also married a third time, to Yolette Thistle Harris, the Australian botanist, educator, author, and conservationist. According to some, this house was a hellhole for her because of her "domineering" father. Stead attended Sydney Girls' High School, to 1919, and went on to Sydney Teachers' College, leaving in 1922 and becoming a teacher, which did not suit her. In 1925 she determined to become a writer, and worked as a secretary.

In 1928 Stead left Australia, finding work in the London grain company Strauss & Co. managed by Edward Strauss; the American manager William James Blech, later Blake, became an important figure in her life, and they married in 1952. She worked in a Parisian bank from 1930 to 1935. She travelled to Spain with Blake, leaving at the outbreak of the Spanish Civil War, and to the USA. After Blake's death from stomach cancer in 1968, she returned to Australia.

== Works ==
Stead wrote 12 novels and published a large number of articles on different subjects in her lifetime. A volume of short stories was published after her death. She taught "Workshop in the Novel" at New York University in 1943 and 1944, and also worked as a Hollywood screenwriter in the 1940s, contributing to the Madame Curie biopic and the John Ford and John Wayne war movie, They Were Expendable. Her first novel, Seven Poor Men of Sydney (1934), dealt with the lives of radicals and dockworkers, but she was not a practitioner of social realism. Stead's best-known novel, titled The Man Who Loved Children, is largely based on her own childhood, and was first published in 1940. It was not until the poet Randall Jarrell wrote the introduction for a new American edition in 1965 and her New York publisher convinced her to change the setting from Sydney to Washington, that the novel began to receive a larger audience. In 2005, the magazine Time included this work in their "100 Best Novels from 1923–2005", and in 2010 American author Jonathan Franzen hailed the novel as a "masterpiece" in the New York Times. Stead's Letty Fox: Her Luck, often regarded as an equally fine novel, was officially banned in Australia for several years because it was considered amoral and salacious.

Stead set one of her two British novels, Cotters' England, partly in Gateshead (called Bridgehead in the novel). She was in Newcastle upon Tyne in the summer of 1949, accompanied by her friend Anne Dooley (née Kelly), a local woman, who was the model for Nellie Cotter, the extraordinary heroine of the book. Anne was no doubt responsible for Stead's reasonable attempt at conveying the local accent. Her letters indicate that she had taken on Tyneside speech and become deeply concerned with the people around her. The American title of the book is Dark Places of the Heart.

== Death and legacy ==
Stead died in hospital at Balmain, Sydney, in 1983, aged 80.

Her former home in Pacific Street, Watsons Bay, was the first site chosen for the Woollahra Council Plaque Scheme, which was launched in 2014 with the aim of honouring significant people who had lived in the area covered by Woollahra Council. A plaque was installed on the footpath outside that home. Another Plaque was installed as part of Sydney Writers Walk as part of a series of 60 circular metal plaques embedded in the footpath between Overseas Passenger Terminal on West Circular Quay and the Sydney Opera House forecourt on East Circular Quay.

The Christina Stead Prize for Fiction has been awarded since 1979 as part of the New South Wales Premier's Literary Awards.

== Works ==
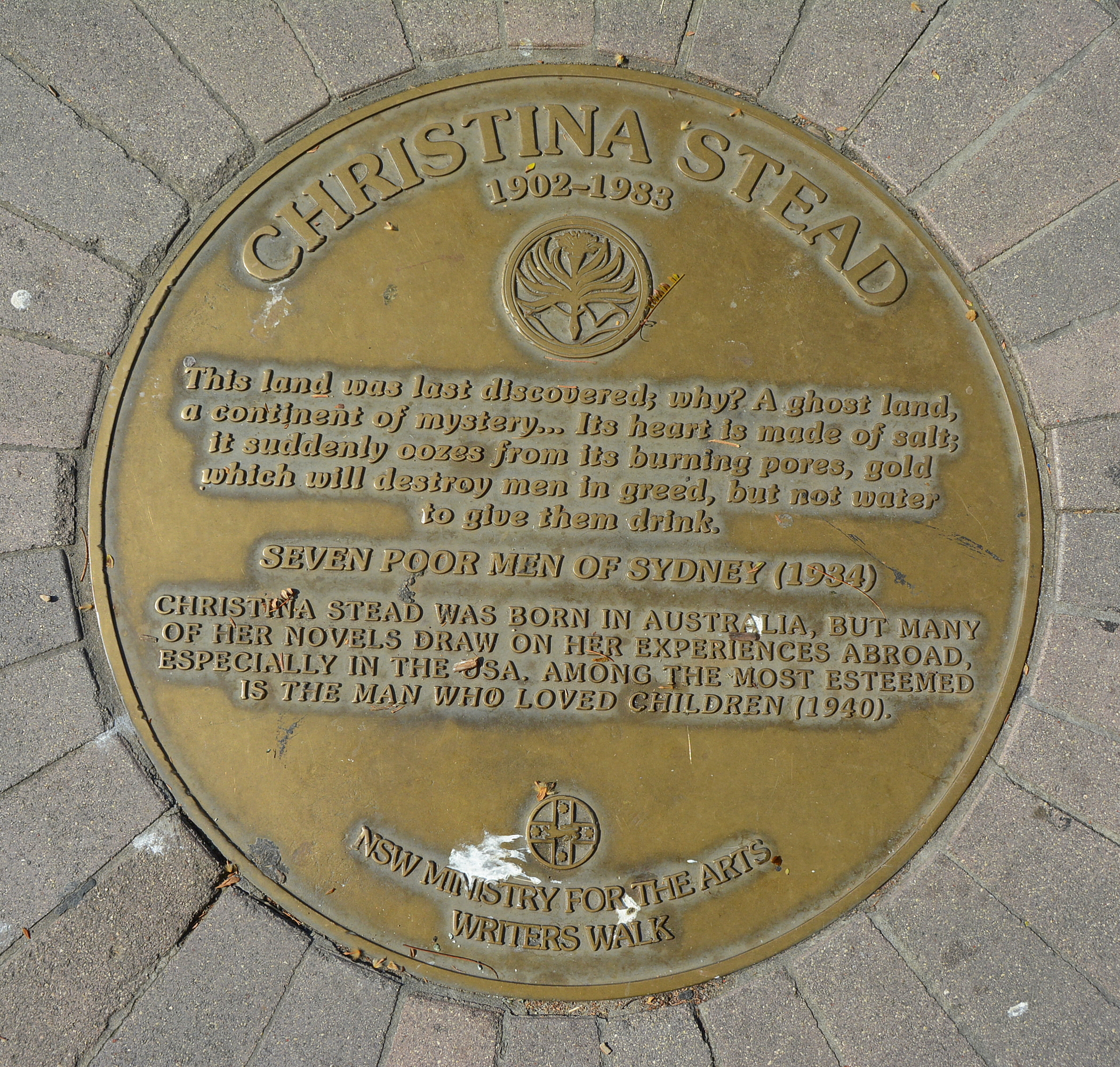
Stead's plaque on the Writers Walk, Circular Quay, Sydney

=== Novels ===
- Seven Poor Men of Sydney (1934)
- The Beauties and Furies (1936)
- House of All Nations (1938)
- The Man Who Loved Children (1940)
- For Love Alone (1945)
- Letty Fox: Her Luck (1946)
- A Little Tea, a Little Chat (1948)
- The People with the Dogs (1952)
- Dark Places of the Heart (1966) (aka Cotters' England)
- The Little Hotel (1973)
- Miss Herbert (The Suburban Wife) (1976)
- I'm Dying Laughing: The Humourist (1986)

=== Short stories ===
- The Salzburg Tales (1934)
- The Puzzleheaded Girl: Four Novellas (1965) (containing The Puzzleheaded Girl, The Dianas, The Rightangled Creek and Girl from the Beach)
- A Christina Stead Reader (1978) edited by Jean B. Read
- Ocean of Story: The Uncollected Stories of Christina Stead, edited by R. G. Geering (1985)

=== Letters ===
- Web of Friendship: Selected letters, 1928–1973, edited by R.G. Geering (1992)
- Talking into the Typewriter: Selected letters, 1973–1983, edited by R.G. Geering (1992)
- Dearest Munx: The Letters of Christina Stead and William J. Blake, edited by Margaret Harris (2006) ISBN 0-522-85173-8

=== Translations ===
- In balloon and Bathyscaphe by Auguste Piccard (1955)
- Colour of Asia by Fernando Gigon (1956)

== Quotes ==
'How suburban!' cried Elvira. I was in Hampstead the other day: in front of one of the richest houses was a crazy pavement: they paid about £35 for it, doubtless. The man who would have done it best was in an asylum : he would have done it for nothing, happy to do it, and the more there is of it, the more dull and plain it looks, just an expanse of conventional craziness, looking as stupid as a neanderthal skull. That's the suburbs all over. That's what we are, you see: suburban, however wild we run. You know quite well, in yourself, don't you, two people like us can't go wild? Still, it's nice to pretend to, for a while.'

— Christina Stead, The Beauties and Furies

They went on playing quietly and waiting for Sam (who had gone back to the bedroom to seek Tommy) and for their turns to see Mother. Bonnie meanwhile, with a rueful expression, was leaning out the front window, and presently she could not help interrupting them, 'Why is my name Mrs Cabbage, why not Mrs Garlic or Mrs Horse Manure?' They did not hear her, so intent were they, visiting each other and inquiring after the health of their respective new babies. They did not hear her complaining to Louie that, instead of being Mrs Grand Piano or Mrs Stair Carpet, they called her Garbage, 'Greta Garbage, Toni Toilet,' said she laughing sadly, 'because they always see me out there with the garbage can and the wet mop; association in children's naïve innocent minds you see!'

'Oh no, it isn't that, protested Louie, Garbage is just a funny word: they associate you with singing and dancing and all those costumes you have in your trunk!'

'Do you think so?' Bonnie was tempted to believe. 'Mrs Strip Tease?'

— Christina Stead, The Man Who Loved Children

And Nelly turned to her and laughed a horrible laugh. She startled herself. She paused to light another cigarette, choking, blowing a cloud to hide her face; and when she could, continued in a gentle voice:

"You will do me a favour? Save me from disillusionment. Let the man coming back with you on Wednesday be a sensible man, who admits it all, defeat and hopelessness and the bitterness; but sanity." "But I don't know why I should," said Camilla, seriously.

"Won't you do what I ask, love? I know him, poor lad. I know what's best. I don't want him roaming the countryside, footloose and aimless and perhaps in some pub, on some roadside pick up some other harpy, instead of swallowing the bitter pill and facing the lonely road."

— Christina Stead, Cotters' England
