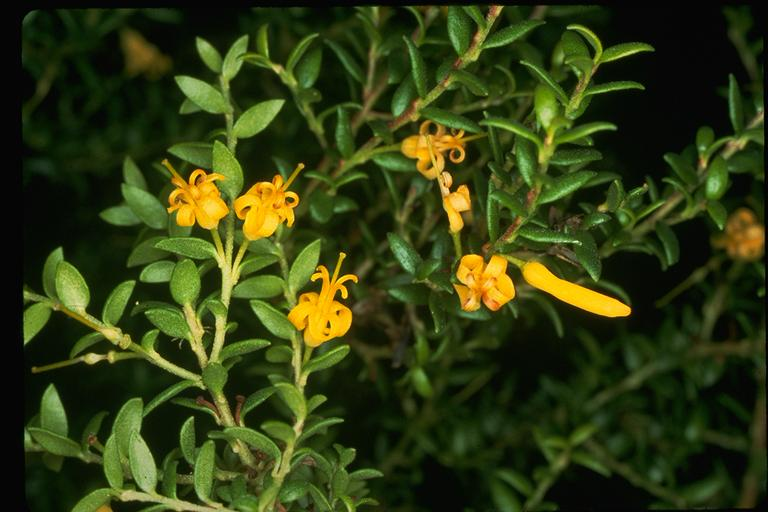
- In the Australian National Botanic Gardens

Conservation status
- Endangered (IUCN 3.1)

- Endangered (EPBC Act)

Scientific classification
- Kingdom: Plantae
- Clade: Embryophytes
- Clade: Tracheophytes
- Clade: Angiosperms
- Clade: Eudicots
- Order: Proteales
- Family: Proteaceae
- Genus: Persoonia
- Species: P. oxycoccoides

Binomial name
- Persoonia oxycoccoides Sieber ex Spreng.

= Persoonia oxycoccoides =

Species of flowering plant

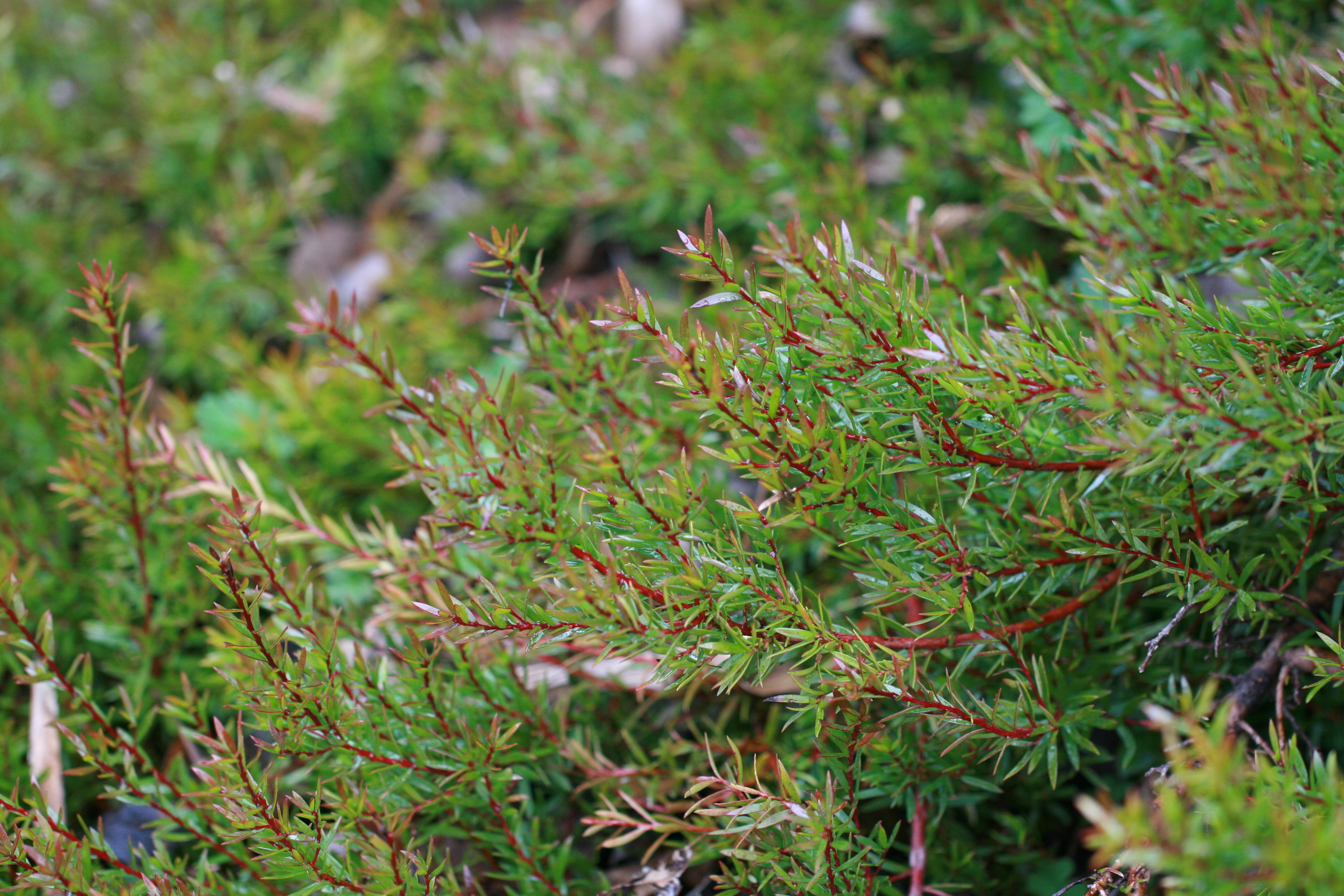
Habit in Blue Mountains Botanic Garden

Persoonia oxycoccoides is a species of flowering plant in the family Proteaceae and is endemic to New South Wales, Australia. It is a spreading to prostrate shrub with smooth bark, hairy young branchlets, elliptic to egg-shaped leaves and yellow flowers arranged in groups of up to thirteen along a rachis that continues to grow after flowering.

== Description ==
Persoonia oxycoccoides is a spreading to prostrate shrub that typically grows to a height of 90 cm (35 in) with smooth bark and sparsely to moderately hairy young branchlets. The leaves are elliptic to egg-shaped, 4–11 mm (0.16–0.43 in) long and 1.5–6 mm (0.059–0.236 in) wide. The flowers are arranged in groups of up to thirteen on a rachis up to 35 mm (1.4 in) long that continues to grow after flowering, each flower on a pedicel 2–5 mm (0.079–0.197 in) long with a leaf at its base. The tepals are yellow, 8–11 mm (0.31–0.43 in) long and glabrous. Flowering occurs from December to April.

== Taxonomy ==
Persoonia oxycoccoides was first formally described in 1827 by Kurt Polycarp Joachim Sprengel in the 17th edition of Systema Vegetabilium from an unpublished description by Franz Sieber.

== Distribution and habitat ==
This geebung grows in montane heath and in forest between Mittagong, Jamberoo and Tallong in south-eastern New South Wales.

== Conservation status ==
Persoonia oxycoccoides is listed as 'Endangered' on the IUCN Red List of Threatened Species, the Environment Protection Biodiversity Conservation Act 1999 and the Biodiversity Conservation Act 2016 of New South Wales.
