= Wirrimbirra Sanctuary =

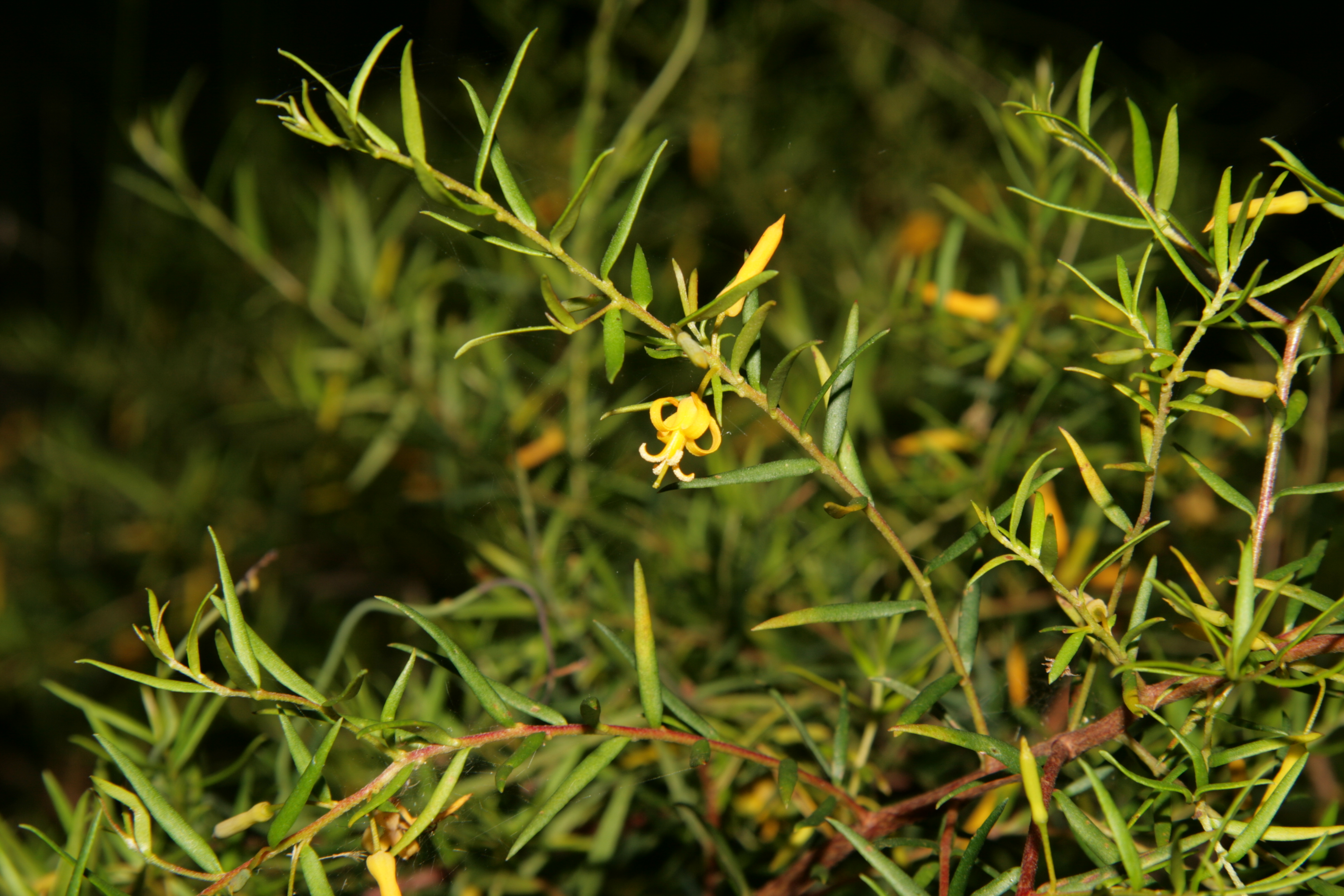
- Persoonia bargoensis, Wirrimbirra Sanctuary, north of Bargo, New South Wales

- Location within New South Wales Location within Australia
- 34°15′52″S 150°34′47″E
- Location: Off the Hume Highway at 1305 Remembrance Drive, Bargo, Wollondilly Shire, New South Wales, Australia

History
- Built: 1962–
- Built for: Stead Foundation

Site notes
- Area: 95 hectares (230 acres)
- Owner: National Trust of Australia (NSW)

New South Wales Heritage Register
- Official name: Wirrimbirra Sanctuary
- Type: State heritage (landscape)
- Designated: 1 March 2002
- Reference no.: 1508
- Type: Flora species site or area
- Category: Landscape – Natural
- Builders: Stead Foundation

The Wirrimbirra Sanctuary is a heritage-listed fauna sanctuary, native plant nursery, education centre and flora sanctuary located off the Hume Highway at 1305 Remembrance Drive, in outer south-western Sydney in the settlement of Bargo in the Wollondilly Shire local government area of New South Wales, Australia. It was built in 1962 by the Stead Foundation. The property is owned by the National Trust of Australia. It was added to the New South Wales State Heritage Register on 1 March 2002.

== History ==
Land on which the sanctuary is situated was acquired in a number of ways. In 1962, a Sydney accountant, Carmen Coleman, discovered this interesting area of remnant bush where Europeans at Bargo made the first sightings of koala and lyrebird. Carmen Coleman donated the parcel of land at Bargo to the David G. Stead Memorial Wildlife Research Foundation, which was established in 1963 to perpetuate the memory of David Stead who was a pioneer of nature conservation in Australia. The National Trust began its association with the Stead Foundation and the Sanctuary in 1963.

Wirrimbirra is an intact remnant example of Bargo Bush, which once covered an extensive area south of Sydney.

Part of Wirrimbirra is freehold, which is now owned by the National Trust, and the balance is Crown Land with the National Trust "trustee for the conservation and study of flora and fauna". The Stead Foundation gave the freehold land to the Trust together with buildings and improvements in 1965, and at the same time arranged for the Crown leases to be transferred to the Trust. The Sanctuary was further extended in 1975. In 1989 the National Trust purchased a narrow strip of land on the southern boundary to improve fire protection for the Field Studies Centre which had been opened in 1971.

Wirrimbirra Native Plant Nursery is registered as a Nursery under the NSW Horticultural Stock and Nursery Act, and a white waratah has its varietal name registered as "Wirrimbirra White" and is the National Variety Register in Canberra.

The Sanctuary contains rich and diverse plantings of native plants in formalised gardens, which were developed to provide areas of representative native plans for education and research purposes. Within the 43 established gardens, there are over 1800 native plants representing a resource base for the study of native flora.

The Field Studies Centre has proved to be the most popular part of the Sanctuary and is recognised as a leading institution in environmental education, both locally and overseas.

Wirrimbirra was gifted to the National Trust (NSW) by the David G. Stead Memorial Wildlife Research Foundation in 1965. The property was leased to the Foundation for several terms up to the present time. Recently a small portion was separately leased to the Australian Native Dog Conservation Society. A comprehensive Conservation Agreement with the NSW Office of Environment and Heritage has been developed for the Wirrimburra Sanctuary to ensure that the native vegetation is managed and conserved in perpetuity.

In late 2015 the National Trust of Australia (NSW) classified the Bargo Gorge Landscape Conservation Area.

== Description ==
Wirrimbirra Sanctuary covers is an area of about 95 hectares (230 acres). Located about halfway between the Bargo River Crossing and the village of Bargo on the Hume Highway, approximately 100 kilometres (62 mi) south of Sydney. Wirrimbirra preserves a part of the original "Bargo Brush" which was of considerable historical importance in the problems which faced the settlement of the Argyle or Southern Tablelands during the early half of the 1800s.

The Sanctuary contains rich and diverse plantings of native plants in formalised gardens, which were developed to provide areas of representative native plans for education and research purposes. Within the 43 established gardens, there are over 1800 native plants representing a resource base for the study of native flora.

The Administration Area contains all the buildings, including two rangers' cottages, an office and bookshop, a display area and amenities. A native plant nursery provides plants for the property and for sale. Within the Sanctuary there is the capacity to accommodate groups of up to 44 people in five-bunk style cabins in the Environmental Studies Centre.

One of the few forested areas remaining on the flat plateau of the Bargo area.

=== Modifications and dates ===
- 2008: upgrading of pathways, services on site.
- November 2008 – January 2009: National Trust Magazine NSW: Wirrimbirra: $15,281 was allocated to assist with the pathways, services and routine maintenance of the site.

== Heritage listing ==
As at 30 June 2000, Wirrimbirra is significant for its role in the development of the conservation movement in NSW; its association with key persons who pioneered the conservation debate; as a natural area with a rich and diverse flora and fauna, including rare and endangered species; as a recreation and social area; as a historic site containing relics and cultural items, as well as being associated with the pioneering expeditions to the Southern Highlands; as an area containing extensive plantings of native plants including rare and endangered species, and as an area which encouraged investigations into the growing and propagation of native plants.

Wirrimbirra Sanctuary was listed on the New South Wales State Heritage Register on 1 March 2002 having satisfied the following criteria.

The place is important in demonstrating the course, or pattern, of cultural or natural history in New South Wales.

Significant for its role in the development of the conservation movement in NSW, and for its association with key persons who pioneered conservation debate, the evolution of the conservation movement in Australia and environmental education in NSW. Also associated with pioneering expeditions which led to the settlement of the Southern Highlands Region and the first written report of the koala and lyrebird in Australia.

The place is important in demonstrating aesthetic characteristics and/or a high degree of creative or technical achievement in New South Wales.

The Sanctuary forms part of a link between the large natural areas of the Metropolitan and Warragamba Catchments and the Greater Blue Mountains and is therefore significant as a corridor for wildlife, particularly as areas immediately to the South of the Sanctuary have been cleared. As a remnant of the Bargo Bush, it contains a rich and diverse flora and fauna habitat including a number of rare or threatened species. It contains extensive plantings of native plants, including rare and endangered flora.

The place has a strong or special association with a particular community or cultural group in New South Wales for social, cultural or spiritual reasons.

It is of social significance for its promotion, education and an example to the community with respect to practical protection of Australia's flora and fauna, and research into management and preservation of indigenous wildlife. Education of young people in the endless facets of the natural and man made environment.

The place has potential to yield information that will contribute to an understanding of the cultural or natural history of New South Wales.

Wirrimbirra is a leaning centre for the education of students in environmental matters through an "outdoor" classroom, designed to represent a variety of plant communities ranging from aquatic plants to tree tops and their related communities. This specialised classroom, together with nature trails, natural Bargo Brush and a nursery, provide valuable lessons for students. The centre is recognised as a leading institution in environmental education.

The place possesses uncommon, rare or endangered aspects of the cultural or natural history of New South Wales.

The importance of Wirrimbirra as a centre for environmental education was recognised by the visit in 1992 of specialists from the OECD as part of an international research project on policy and practice in environmental education. Wirrimbirra holds an enviable reputation in promoting the environmental message through education and research.

== See also ==
- Stead Foundation
