= The People with the Dogs =

Book by Christina Stead

- First edition
- Author: Christina Stead
- Language: English
- Genre: Literary fiction
- Publisher: Little, Brown
- Publication date: 1952
- Publication place: USA
- Media type: Print
- Pages: 345pp
- Preceded by: A Little Tea, a Little Chat
- Followed by: Dark Places of the Heart

The People with the Dogs (1952) is a novel by Australian writer Christina Stead.

== Story outline ==
Edward Massine has returned home to New York from the Second World War to his family. The last of his line he is in a comfortable position that he finds difficult to break away from. He waits to marry his long-term girlfriend who chooses another, but subsequently meets and marries Lydia, an actress, exchanging his family life for a new future.

== Critical reception ==
A reviewer in Kirkus Review found good and not-so-good points with the book: "An acrid, often amusing, occasionally tiresome probing of a rather squashy segment of New York City's population and also an examination of the problem of nonconformity in contemporary society - a novel sounding some telling notes which unfortunately evaporate into the thin upper air of attenuated symbolism."

In 2011 Edmund White listed the novel as one of his "top 10 New York Books" in The Guardian: "A study of indolent, comfortable New Yorkers in the period just after the war. These are people who are constantly visiting one another, sitting on their stoops, playing with their pets, enjoying life to the fullest. I can think of no other novel that is so agreeable and so devoid of incident."

== See also ==
- 1952 in Australian literature
