= Australian Wildlife Society =

Australian wildlife conservation organisation

- Formation: May 1909
- Founded at: Sydney, Australia
- Type: NGO
- Purpose: Wildlife conservation
- Location: Campbelltown, New South Wales
- President: Mr Stephen Grabowski
- Key people: Board of Directors
- Publication: Australian Wildlife and Wildlife Wisdom
- Website: www.aws.org.au
- Formerly called: Wildlife Preservation Society of Australia

The Australian Wildlife Society was established in Sydney, Australia in May 1909 as the Wildlife Preservation Society of Australia (WPSA) to encourage the protection of, and cultivate an interest in, Australia's flora and fauna. The founding president of the Society was The Hon. Frederick Earle Winchcombe MLC. David Stead was one of four vice presidents and a very active founder of the Society.

The Society is a national not-for-profit wildlife conservation organisation dedicated to conserving Australian wildlife (flora and fauna) through national environmental education, advocacy, and community involvement.

== History ==
In 2009, the Society celebrated a centenary of wildlife conservation.

In 2013, the Wildlife Preservation Society of Australia was rebranded as the Australian Wildlife Society (AWS).

In 2019, the Australian Wildlife Society celebrated its 110th Birthday and released a birthday video in collaboration with Design Centre Enmore TAFE New South Wales. In the same year, the board engaged its first paid employee – National Office Manager, Ms Megan Fabian.

In 2020, the Society established a new National Head Office in Hurstville, New South Wales.

In 2021, the Society established 'Snip Rings for Wildlife', a campaign that aims to raise awareness and encourage individuals to protect Australia’s wildlife, by cutting through plastic rings, rubber bands, hair ties, the loops of facemasks, and plastic dome-shaped lids, in their entirety, before disposing of them.

In 2022, the Society increased the value of its annual University Research Grants to ten $3,000 grants – totalling $30,000 each year.

In 2024, for the first time in over one hundred years, the Board of the Society purchased and established a new National Office and Education Centre at 9/121 Queen Street, Campbelltown, New South Wales, which was officially opened on Tuesday, 20 August 2024, at 11 am by Mr Gregory Warren MP, Member for Campbelltown.

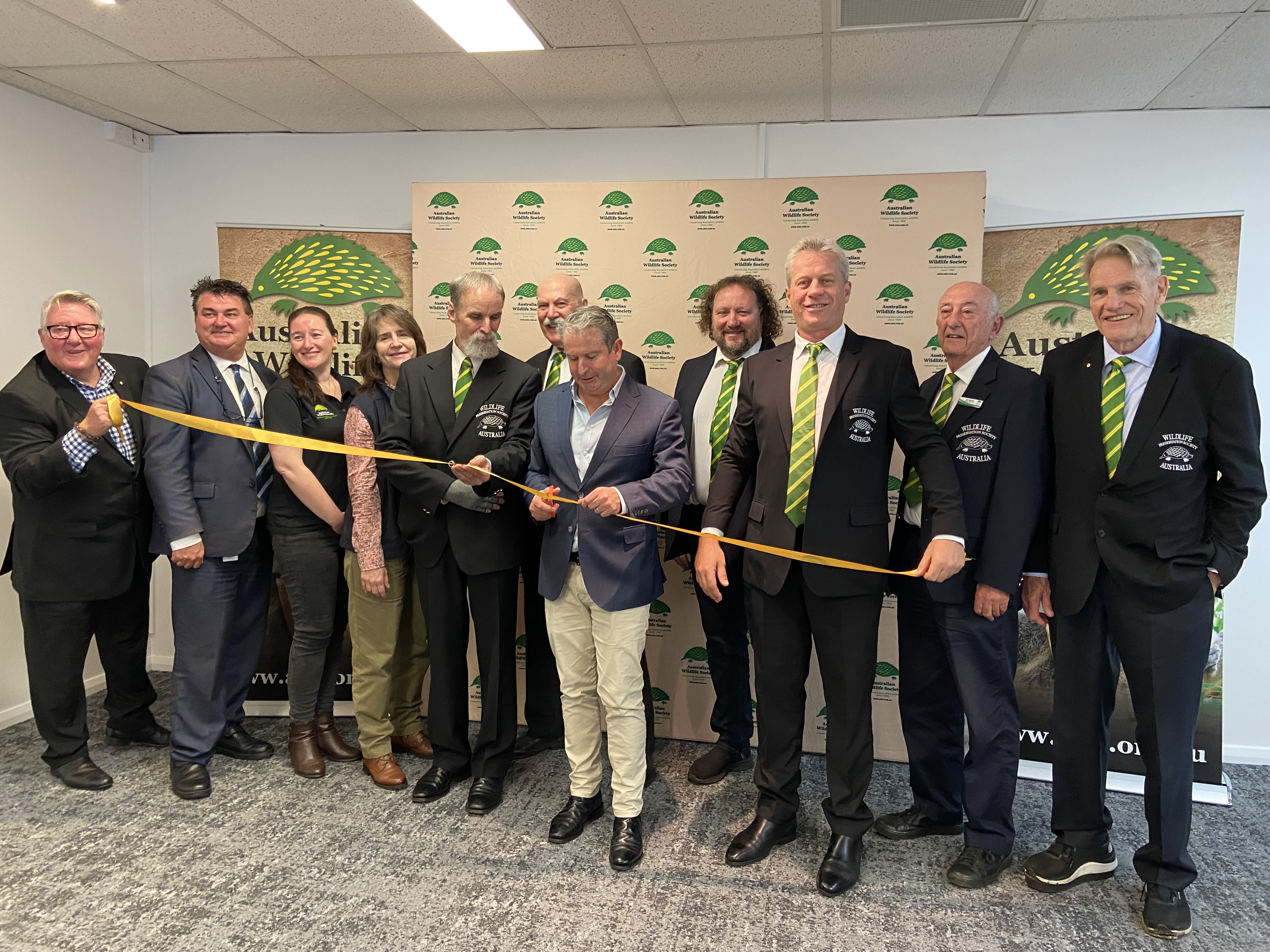
Gregory Warren MP, the Board of Directors of the Society, Steve Wisbey OAM, and Councillor Warren Morrison cut the ribbon to mark the official opening. Image: Megan Fabian.

== Serventy Conservation Medal ==
The Serventy Conservation Medal was inaugurated in 1999 to commemorate conservation work by members of the Serventy family, the siblings Lucy, Dominic and Vincent Serventy. The award honours conservation work that has not been done as part of a professional career for which the person will have been paid and honoured, but for work done for a love of nature and a determination that it should be conserved. The first award of the Medal was made in 1998. People who have been awarded the Medal are:

- 1998 – Margaret Thorsborne – for work in the conservation of local fruit pigeons and cassowaries and environmental conservation at Mission Beach, Queensland
- 1999 – Bernie Clarke – for lifetime devotion as a local environmentalist and long-time Towra/Botany Bay campaigner
- 2000 – Judy Messer – for outstanding contribution to conservation and environmental protection work in New South Wales
- 2001 – Ron Taylor and Valerie Taylor – for promoting a greater understanding of the Great Barrier Reef and the need to protect its wildlife
- 2002 – John and Cecily Fenton – for wildlife habitat conservation on their property, Lanark, in south western Victoria
- 2003 – Lance Ferris – of the Australian Seabird Rescue team
- 2004 – Wayne Reynolds – for work with the Cape Solander Whale Migration Study on the coast of the Royal National Park, Sydney
- 2005 – Lyall Kenneth Metcalfe – for lifetime contribution to the conservation movement in New South Wales and the Northern Territory
- 2006 – Lindsay Smith – for wildlife conservation work involving seabirds
- 2007 – Bev Smiles – for dedication to the conservation of native forests in New South Wales
- 2008 – Barry Scott – of the Koala Foundation, for dedication to Koala conservation
- 2009 – June Butcher – for dedication in promoting the welfare of native animals
- 2010 – Helen George – for dedication to the welfare of native animals
- 2011 – Jenny Maclean – for her contributions to saving the spectacled flying fox
- 2012 – Bob Irwin – for services to conservation and education
- 2013 – Not awarded
- 2014 – Helen Bergen and Ray Mjadwesch – for helping injured animals
- 2015 – John Weigel – of the Australian Reptile Park, for his work to help the Tasmanian devil
- 2016 – Awarded jointly to Graeme Sawyer – Lord Mayor of Darwin from 2008–2012
- 2017 – Jennie Gilbert for her work to rescue, rehabilitation and release of marine turtles.
- 2018 – Lorraine Vass of Lismore, New South Wales
- 2019 – Alexandra Seddon of Merimbula, New South Wales
- 2020 – Professor Kevin Kenneally AM for his contribution to wildlife conservation, science, & education
- 2021 – Maureen Christie of Aberfoyle Park, South Australia
- 2022 - Patricia LeeHong for her work in rehabilitating orphaned echidnas.
- 2023 - Robert Westerman for safeguarding endangered migratory shorebirds on the Gold Coast, QLD.
