= The Man Who Loved Children =

Novel by Christina Stead

- First edition
- Author: Christina Stead
- Language: English
- Publisher: Simon & Schuster
- Publication date: 1940
- Publication place: Australia
- Media type: Print (Hardback & Paperback)
- Pages: 527pp
- Preceded by: House of All Nations
- Followed by: For Love Alone

The Man Who Loved Children is a 1940 novel by Australian writer Christina Stead. It was not until a reissue edition in 1965, with an introduction by poet Randall Jarrell, that it found widespread critical acclaim and popularity. Time magazine included the novel in its TIME 100 Best English-language Novels from 1923 to 2005. The novel has been championed by novelists Robert Stone, Jonathan Franzen and Angela Carter. Carter believed Stead's other novels Cotters England; A Little Tea, A Little Chat; and For Love Alone to be as good, if not better than The Man Who Loved Children.

== Plot introduction ==
The novel tells the story of a highly dysfunctional family, the Pollits. The naïve egoism of the eponymous Sam Pollit overwhelms his family, especially his wife Henny and eldest daughter Louie. The family is not wealthy, a situation exacerbated by Sam's idealism, Henny's accumulated debts, and the terrible rift between the couple. Stead details the parents' marital battles and the various accounts of the blended family's affections and alliances. The character Sam is largely based on Stead's own father, marine biologist David Stead. The Man Who Loved Children was originally set in Sydney but the setting was altered to suit an American audience, to Washington, D.C., somewhat unconvincingly due to linguistic nuances. Unsparing and penetrating, Stead reveals, among other things, the danger of unchecked sentimentality in relationships and in political thought.

== Critical response ==
In his 1965 introduction to the novel—titled "An Unread Book"—the poet, novelist and critic Randall Jarrell writes: "no other novel makes so scrupulous, so passionate, and so convincing a study of a family — and with such generalizing force that one immediately expands that to the family." In a 2010 New York Times Book Review essay about the work, writer Jonathan Franzen calls it, "the kind of book that, if it is for you, is really for you. I’m convinced that there are tens of thousands of people in this country who would bless the day the book was published, if only they could be exposed to it." Franzen says of the novel's internal style, "Its prose ranges from good to fabulously good — is lyrical in the true sense, every observation and description bursting with feeling, meaning, subjectivity — and although its plotting is unobtrusively masterly, the book operates at a pitch of psychological violence that makes Revolutionary Road look like Everybody Loves Raymond. And, worse yet, can never stop laughing at that violence!. . .The book intrudes on our better-regulated world like a bad dream from the grandparental past. Its idea of a happy ending is like no other novel’s, and probably not at all like yours." In a 2021 interview with Vulture, Franzen said: "I have written about it, and I have remained confounded that it is not universally regarded as canonical. It’s Christina Stead’s great novel from the mid-20th century. It has three world-class characters. Most novelists don’t produce any world-class characters. There are three in that one book. It seems to me an undeniably feminist text; I don’t understand why it’s not canonical in women’s studies programs."

In a 2013 interview, novelist Robert Stone said:

“I always thought one of the great American books was The Man Who Loved Children by Christina Stead. The funny thing about that book is, you think that she has gotten a certain kind of American character down, a certain kind of American family nailed. And as it turns out, it was originally set entirely in Australia and all the characters were Australians, and her publisher talked her into making them all Americans for the U.S. edition. They were never intended to be Americans. It’s a book I go back to a lot.”

A 2023 study by Olga Sedneva, Between the Lines. Behind the Doors, explores the historical truth of the novel, questioning whether it could be more autobiographical than fiction.
